= List of Swedish Short Course Swimming Championships champions (women) =

This is a list of women's champions of the Swedish Short Course Swimming Championships, the annual swimming championship in short course, usually held indoors in the Swedish winter. Records go back to 1953 in freestyle, backstroke, breaststroke, butterfly, and various relays and medley competitions.

== Current program ==
=== 50 metre freestyle ===
- 1953 – Monica Peters (Limhamns SS)
- 1954 – Marianne Lundquist (SK Neptun)
- 1955 – Eva Varde (SK Poseidon)
- 1956 – Kate Jobson (Varbergs GIF)
- 1957 – Kate Jobson (Varbergs GIF)
- 1983 – Agneta Eriksson (Västerås SS)
- 1984 – Stina Persson (Helsingborgs S)
- 1985 – Agneta Eriksson (Västerås SS)
- 1986 – Agneta Eriksson (Västerås SS)
- 1987 – Karin Furuhed (Borlänge SS)
- 1988 – Karin Furuhed (Borlänge SS)
- 1989 – Linda Olofsson (Älvsby SS)
- 1990 – Louise Karlsson (Skärets SS)
- 1991 – Ellenor Svensson (Norrköpings KK)
- 1992 – Linda Olofsson (Sundsvalls SS)
- 1993 – Linda Olofsson (Sundsvalls SS)
- 1994 – Linda Olofsson (Sundsvalls SS)
- 1995 – Linda Olofsson (Södertälje SS)
- 1996 – Linda Olofsson (Södertälje SS)
- 1997 – Therese Alshammar (SK Neptun)
- 1998 – Therese Alshammar (SK Neptun)
- 1999 – Therese Alshammar (SK Neptun)
- 2000 – Therese Alshammar (SK Neptun)
- 2001 – Therese Alshammar (SK Neptun)
- 2002 – Therese Alshammar (SK Neptun)
- 2003 – Therese Alshammar (SK Neptun)
- 2004 – Therese Alshammar (SK Neptun)
- 2005 – Therese Alshammar (SK Neptun)
- 2006 – Therese Alshammar (SK Neptun)
- 2007 – Claire Hedenskog (Göteborg Sim)
- 2008 – Therese Alshammar (Täby Sim)
- 2009 – Therese Alshammar (Täby Sim)
- 2010 – Therese Alshammar (Täby Sim)
- 2011 – Sarah Sjöström (Södertörns SS)
- 2012 – Sarah Sjöström (Södertörns SS)
- 2013 – Sarah Sjöström (Södertörns SS)
- 2014 – Sarah Sjöström (Södertörns SS)
- 2015 – Therese Alshammar (Täby Sim)
- 2016 – Nathalie Lindborg (Malmö KK)
- 2017 – Magdalena Kuras (SK Triton)
- 2018 – Michelle Coleman (Spårvägens SF)
- 2019 – Michelle Coleman (Spårvägens SF)
- 2021 – Sophie Hansson (Helsingborgs S)
- 2022 – Michelle Coleman (Spårvägens SF)

=== 100 metre freestyle ===
- 1972 – Anita Zarnowiecki (Simavdelningen 1902)
- 1973 – Anita Zarnowiecki (Simavdelningen 1902)
- 1974 – Diana Olsson (Stockholmspolisens IF)
- 1975 – Eva Andersson (SK Najaden)
- 1976 – Ida Hansson (Simavdelningen 1902)
- 1977 – Gunn-Berit Myrvall (Järfälla Sim)
- 1978 – Birgitta Jönsson (Avesta SS)
- 1979 – Birgitta Jönsson (Avesta SS)
- 1980 – Agneta Eriksson (Västerås SS)
- 1981 – Agneta Eriksson (Västerås SS)
- 1982 – Agneta Eriksson (Västerås SS)
- 1983 – Agneta Eriksson (Västerås SS)
- 1984 – Agneta Eriksson (Västerås SS)
- 1985 – Agneta Eriksson (Västerås SS)
- 1986 – Agneta Eriksson (Västerås SS)
- 1987 – Karin Furuhed (Borlänge SS)
- 1988 – Karin Furuhed (Borlänge SS)
- 1989 – Helena Kälvehed (SK Korrugal)
- 1990 – Eva Nyberg (Mariestads SS)
- 1991 – Ellenor Svensson (Norrköpings KK)
- 1992 – Linda Olofsson (Sundsvalls SS)
- 1993 – Ellenor Svensson (Norrköpings KK)
- 1994 – Susanne Lööw (Södertälje SS)
- 1995 – Johanna Sjöberg (Helsingborgs S)
- 1996 – Linda Olofsson (Södertälje SS)
- 1997 – Therese Alshammar (SK Neptun)
- 1998 – Therese Alshammar (SK Neptun)
- 1999 – Louise Jöhncke (Spårvägens SF)
- 2000 – Malin Svahnström (Väsby SS)
- 2001 – Therese Alshammar (SK Neptun)
- 2002 – Therese Alshammar (SK Neptun)
- 2003 – Therese Alshammar (SK Neptun)
- 2004 – Johanna Sjöberg (Spårvägens SF)
- 2005 – Josefin Lillhage (Väsby SS)
- 2006 – Josefin Lillhage (Väsby SS)
- 2007 – Ida Marko-Varga (SK Ran)
- 2008 – Josefin Lillhage (Väsby SS)
- 2009 – Therese Alshammar (SK Neptun)
- 2010 – Sarah Sjöström (Södertörns SS)
- 2011 – Sarah Sjöström (Södertörns SS)
- 2012 – Louise Hansson (Helsingborgs S)
- 2013 – Michelle Coleman (Täby Sim)
- 2014 – Sarah Sjöström (Södertörns SS)
- 2015 – Sarah Sjöström (Södertörns SS)
- 2016 – Michelle Coleman (Spårvägens SF)
- 2017 – Nathalie Lindborg (Malmö KK)
- 2018 – Michelle Coleman (Spårvägens SF)
- 2019 – Michelle Coleman (Spårvägens SF)
- 2021 – Hanna Eriksson (Jönköpings SS)
- 2022 – Michelle Coleman (Spårvägens SF)

=== 200 metre freestyle ===
- 1956 – Anita Hellström (SK Neptun)
- 1957 – Anita Hellström (SK Neptun)
- 1958 – Barbro Andersson (SK Ran)
- 1959 – Bibbi Segerström (SK Neptun)
- 1960 – Bibbi Segerström (SK Neptun)
- 1961 – Jane Cederqvist (SK Neptun)
- 1962 – Inger Thorngren (Upsala S)
- 1963 – Ann-Christine Hagberg (SK Neptun)
- 1964 – Ann-Christine Hagberg (SK Neptun)
- 1965 – Ann-Christine Hagberg (SK Neptun)
- 1966 – Ann-Charlott Lilja (SK Najaden)
- 1967 – Elisabeth Berglund (Timrå AIF)
- 1968 – Elisabeth Ljunggren Morris (SK Neptun)
- 1969 – Vera Kock (Timrå AIF)
- 1970 – Anita Zarnowiecki (Simavdelningen 1902)
- 1971 – Gunilla Jonsson (Malmö S)
- 1976 – Pia Mårtensson (Varbergs GIF)
- 1977 – Pia Mårtensson (Varbergs GIF)
- 1978 – Birgitta Jönsson (Avesta SS)
- 1979 – Birgitta Jönsson (Avesta SS)
- 1980 – Agneta Eriksson (Västerås SS)
- 1981 – Agneta Eriksson (Västerås SS)
- 1982 – Agneta Eriksson (Västerås SS)
- 1983 – Agneta Eriksson (Västerås SS)
- 1984 – Agneta Eriksson (Västerås SS)
- 1985 – Suzanne Nilsson (Simavdelningen 1902)
- 1986 – Agneta Eriksson (Västerås SS)
- 1987 – Agneta Eriksson (Västerås SS)
- 1988 – Suzanne Nilsson (Helsingborgs S)
- 1989 – Malin Gustavsson (Kristianstads SLS)
- 1990 – Malin Nilsson (Malmö KK)
- 1991 – Malin Nilsson (Malmö KK)
- 1992 – Malin Nilsson (Malmö KK)
- 1993 – Malin Nilsson (Malmö KK)
- 1994 – Malin Nilsson (Malmö KK)
- 1995 – Louise Jöhncke (Spårvägens SF)
- 1996 – Josefin Lillhage (Simavdelningen 1902)
- 1997 – Johanna Sjöberg (Helsingborgs S)
- 1998 – Malin Svahnström (Väsby SS)
- 1999 – Josefin Lillhage (Göteborg Sim)
- 2000 – Malin Svahnström (Väsby SS)
- 2001 – Malin Svahnström (Väsby SS)
- 2002 – Johanna Sjöberg (Södertälje SS)
- 2003 – Josefin Lillhage (Väsby SS)
- 2004 – Josefin Lillhage (Väsby SS)
- 2005 – Josefin Lillhage (Väsby SS)
- 2006 – Josefin Lillhage (Väsby SS)
- 2007 – Petra Granlund (Väsby SS)
- 2008 – Petra Granlund (Väsby SS)
- 2009 – Petra Granlund (Väsby SS)
- 2010 – Gabriella Fagundez (Väsby SS)
- 2011 – Sarah Sjöström (Södertörns SS)
- 2012 – Sarah Sjöström (Södertörns SS)
- 2013 – Michelle Coleman (Täby Sim)
- 2014 – Sarah Sjöström (Södertörns SS)
- 2015 – Louise Hansson (Helsingborgs S)
- 2016 – Emma Wahlström (Spårvägens SF)
- 2017 – Sarah Sjöström (Södertörns SS)
- 2018 – Hanna Eriksson (Jönköpings SS)
- 2019 – Hanna Eriksson (Jönköpings SS)
- 2021 – Hanna Eriksson (Jönköpings SS)
- 2022 – Sofia Åstedt (SK Elfsborg) and Sara Junevik (Falu SS)

=== 400 metre freestyle ===
- 1972 – Carina Eriksson (Gävle SS)
- 1973 – Anita Zarnowiecki (Simavdelningen 1902)
- 1974 – Anita Zarnowiecki (Simavdelningen 1902)
- 1975 – Else Gunsten (Kristianstads SLS)
- 1976 – Gunilla Lundberg (Borlänge SS)
- 1977 – Susanne Ackum (Borlänge SS)
- 1978 – Anette Fredriksson (Simavdelningen 1902)
- 1979 – Susanne Ackum (Borlänge SS)
- 1980 – Monica Parsmark (Upsala S)
- 1981 – Tina Gustafsson (Norrköpings KK)
- 1982 – Ann Linder (SK Najaden)
- 1983 – Ann Linder (SK Najaden)
- 1984 – Ann Linder (SK Najaden)
- 1985 – Suzanne Nilsson (Simavdelningen 1902)
- 1986 – Suzanne Nilsson (Simavdelningen 1902)
- 1987 – Anette Möller (Varbergs Sim)
- 1988 – Suzanne Nilsson (Helsingborgs S)
- 1989 – Linda Rönnbäck (Luleå SS)
- 1990 – Malin Nilsson (Malmö KK)
- 1991 – Malin Nilsson (Malmö KK)
- 1992 – Malin Nilsson (Malmö KK)
- 1993 – Malin Nilsson (Malmö KK)
- 1994 – Malin Nilsson (Malmö KK)
- 1995 – Malin Nilsson (Simavdelningen 1902)
- 1996 – Åsa Sandlund (Linköpings ASS)
- 1997 – Johanna Sjöberg (Helsingborgs S)
- 1998 – Åsa Sandlund (Linköpings ASS)
- 1999 – Lotta Wänberg (Malmö KK)
- 2000 – Josefin Lillhage (Väsby SS)
- 2001 – Ann Berglund (Jönköpings SS)
- 2002 – Josefin Lillhage (Väsby SS)
- 2003 – Josefin Lillhage (Väsby SS)
- 2004 – Josefin Lillhage (Väsby SS)
- 2005 – Josefin Lillhage (Väsby SS)
- 2006 – Josefin Lillhage (Väsby SS)
- 2007 – Gabriella Fagundez (SK Ran)
- 2008 – Eva Berglund (Jönköpings SS)
- 2009 – Gabriella Fagundez (Linköpings ASS)
- 2010 – Gabriella Fagundez (Väsby SS)
- 2011 – Ida Marko-Varga (SK Triton)
- 2012 – Céline Bertrand (Skövde SS)
- 2013 – Louise Hansson (Helsingborgs S)
- 2014 – Sarah Sjöström (Södertörns SS)
- 2015 – Sarah Sjöström (Södertörns SS)
- 2016 – Hanna Eriksson (Jönköpings SS)
- 2017 – Hanna Eriksson (Jönköpings SS)
- 2018 – Hanna Eriksson (Jönköpings SS)
- 2019 – Hanna Eriksson (Jönköpings SS)
- 2021 – Hanna Eriksson (Jönköpings SS)
- 2022 – Thilda Häll (SK Elfsborg)

=== 800 metre freestyle ===
- 1961 – Jane Cederqvist (SK Neptun)
- 1962 – Ann-Charlott Lilja (SK Najaden)
- 1963 – Elisabeth Ljunggren (SK Neptun)
- 1964 – Ann-Charlott Lilja (SK Najaden)
- 1965 – Ann-Charlott Lilja (SK Najaden)
- 1966 – Ann-Charlott Lilja (SK Najaden)
- 1968 – Elisabeth Ljunggren Morris (SK Neptun)
- 1969 – Vera Kock (Timrå AIF)
- 1970 – Gunilla Wikman (Stockholmspolisens IF)
- 1971 – Gunilla Jonsson (Malmö S)
- 1972 – Else Gunsten (Kristianstads SLS)
- 1973 – Else Gunsten (Kristianstads SLS)
- 1974 – Gunilla Lundberg (Umeå SS)
- 1975 – Else Gunsten (Kristianstads SLS)
- 1976 – Gunilla Lundberg (Borlänge SS)
- 1977 – Susanne Ackum (Borlänge SS)
- 1978 – Susanne Ackum (Borlänge SS)
- 1985 – Suzanne Nilsson (Simavdelningen 1902)
- 1986 – Suzanne Nilsson (Simavdelningen 1902)
- 1987 – Anna Rosengren (SK Elfsborg)
- 1988 – Linda Rönnbäck (Luleå SS)
- 1989 – Linda Rönnbäck (Luleå SS)
- 1990 – Malin Nilsson (Malmö KK)
- 1991 – Malin Nilsson (Malmö KK)
- 1992 – Malin Nilsson (Malmö KK)
- 1993 – Malin Nilsson (Malmö KK)
- 1994 – Malin Nilsson (Malmö KK)
- 1995 – Malin Nilsson (Simavdelningen 1902)
- 1996 – Åsa Sandlund (Linköpings ASS)
- 1997 – Åsa Sandlund (Linköpings ASS)
- 1998 – Åsa Sandlund (Linköpings ASS)
- 1999 – Ann Berglund (Jönköpings SS)
- 2000 – Maria Öberg (Ystads SS)
- 2001 – Ann Berglund (Jönköpings SS)
- 2002 – Ann Berglund (Jönköpings SS)
- 2003 – Teresia Gimholt (S 77 Stenungsund)
- 2004 – Teresia Gimholt (S 77 Stenungsund)
- 2005 – Teresia Gimholt (S 77 Stenungsund)
- 2006 – Gabriella Fagundez (SK Ran)
- 2007 – Gabriella Fagundez (SK Ran)
- 2008 – Eva Berglund (Jönköpings SS)
- 2009 – Gabriella Fagundez (Linköpings ASS)
- 2010 – Gabriella Fagundez (Väsby SS)
- 2011 – Martina Granström (Jönköpings SS)
- 2012 – Martina Granström (Jönköpings SS)
- 2013 – Céline Bertrand (Skövde SS)
- 2014 – Laura Lajunen (SK Neptun)
- 2015 – Laura Lajunen (SK Neptun)
- 2016 – Hanna Eriksson (Jönköpings SS)
- 2017 – Hanna Eriksson (Jönköpings SS)
- 2018 – Hanna Eriksson (Jönköpings SS)
- 2019 – Hanna Eriksson (Jönköpings SS)
- 2021 – Lucie Hanquet (Göteborg Sim)
- 2022 – Thilda Häll (SK Elfsborg)

=== 1500 metre freestyle ===
- 1979 – Susanne Ackum (Borlänge SS)
- 1980 – Pernilla Henriksson (Växjö SS)
- 1981 – Ann Linder (SK Najaden)
- 1982 – Ann Linder (SK Najaden)
- 1983 – Ann Linder (SK Najaden)
- 1984 – Ann-Charlotte Brodén (Motala SS)
- 2013 – Erica Dahlgren (SK S 02)
- 2014 – Laura Lajunen (SK Neptun)
- 2015 – Laura Lajunen (SK Neptun)
- 2016 – Christine Ekman (SK Neptun)
- 2017 – Emma Sundstedt (Spårvägens SF)
- 2018 – Hanna Eriksson (Jönköpings SS)
- 2019 – Lucie Hanquet (Göteborg Sim)
- 2021 – Lucie Hanquet (Göteborg Sim)
- 2022 – Thilda Häll (SK Elfsborg)

=== 50 metre backstroke ===
- 1990 – Annelie Johansson (Västerås SS)
- 1991 – Therese Alshammar (Järfälla Sim)
- 1992 – Therèse Lundin (Helsingborgs S)
- 1993 – Therese Alshammar (SK Neptun)
- 1994 – Therese Alshammar (SK Neptun)
- 1995 – Therese Alshammar (SK Neptun)
- 1996 – Therese Alshammar (Helsingborgs S)
- 1997 – Therese Alshammar (SK Neptun)
- 1998 – Therese Alshammar (SK Neptun)
- 1999 – Therese Alshammar (SK Neptun)
- 2000 – Therese Alshammar (SK Neptun)
- 2001 – Anna-Karin Kammerling (Sundsvalls SS)
- 2002 – Anna-Karin Kammerling (Sundsvalls SS)
- 2003 – Emelie Kierkegaard (Spårvägens SF)
- 2004 – Therese Alshammar (SK Neptun)
- 2005 – Therese Alshammar (SK Neptun)
- 2006 – Therese Alshammar (SK Neptun)
- 2007 – Anna-Karin Kammerling (Sundsvalls SS)
- 2008 – Lovisa Ericsson (Täby Sim)
- 2009 – Therese Alshammar (SK Neptun)
- 2010 – Magdalena Kuras (Malmö KK)
- 2011 – Magdalena Kuras (SK Triton)
- 2012 – Magdalena Kuras (SK Triton)
- 2013 – Michelle Coleman (Täby Sim)
- 2014 – Michelle Coleman (Spårvägens SF)
- 2015 – Hanna Rosvall (Ängelholms SS)
- 2016 – Hanna Rosvall (Ängelholms SS)
- 2017 – Hanna Rosvall (Ängelholms SS)
- 2018 – Michelle Coleman (Spårvägens SF)
- 2019 – Michelle Coleman (Spårvägens SF)
- 2021 – Hanna Rosvall (Helsingborgs S)
- 2022 – Hanna Rosvall (Helsingborgs S)

=== 100 metre backstroke ===
- 1976 – Gunilla Lundberg (Borlänge SS)
- 1977 – Cecilia Eklund (Täby Sim)
- 1978 – Susanne Collgård (Karlslunds IF)
- 1979 – Ann Hultstrand (Malmö S)
- 1980 – Pensé Andersen (Landskrona SS)
- 1981 – Johanna Holmén (Västerås SS)
- 1982 – Annika Uvehall (Kristianstads SLS)
- 1983 – Pensé Andersen (SK Ran)
- 1984 – Anna-Karin Eriksson (Kalix SS)
- 1985 – Camilla Olsson (SK Ran)
- 1986 – Anna-Karin Eriksson (Kalix SS)
- 1987 – Johanna Larsson (Mariestads SS)
- 1988 – Johanna Larsson (Mariestads SS)
- 1989 – Johanna Larsson (Mariestads SS)
- 1990 – Camilla Olsson (Malmö KK)
- 1991 – Ulrika Jardfeldt (Turebergs IF)
- 1992 – Therese Alshammar (Järfälla Sim)
- 1993 – Therese Alshammar (SK Neptun)
- 1994 – Therese Alshammar (SK Neptun)
- 1995 – Therese Alshammar (SK Neptun)
- 1996 – Therese Alshammar (Helsingborgs S)
- 1997 – Therese Alshammar (SK Neptun)
- 1998 – Therese Alshammar (SK Neptun)
- 1999 – Therese Alshammar (SK Neptun)
- 2000 – Camilla Johansson (Trelleborgs SS)
- 2001 – Camilla Johansson (Trelleborgs SS)
- 2002 – Camilla Johansson (Trelleborgs SS)
- 2003 – Camilla Johansson (Trelleborgs SS)
- 2004 – Martina Svensson (Linköpings ASS)
- 2005 – Carin Möller (Kalmar SS) and Therese Svendsen (SK Ran)
- 2006 – Therese Svendsen (SK Ran)
- 2007 – Therese Svendsen (SK Ran)
- 2008 – Lovisa Ericsson (Täby Sim)
- 2009 – Lovisa Ericsson (Täby Sim)
- 2010 – Petra Granlund (Väsby SS)
- 2011 – Michelle Coleman (Täby Sim)
- 2012 – Michelle Coleman (Täby Sim)
- 2013 – Michelle Coleman (Täby Sim)
- 2014 – Michelle Coleman (Spårvägens SF)
- 2015 – Louise Hansson (Helsingborgs S)
- 2016 – Michelle Coleman (Spårvägens SF)
- 2017 – Hanna Rosvall (Ängelholms SS)
- 2018 – Michelle Coleman (Spårvägens SF)
- 2019 – Michelle Coleman (Spårvägens SF)
- 2021 – Sara Junevik (Falu SS)
- 2022 – Hanna Rosvall (Helsingborgs S)

=== 200 metre backstroke ===
- 1953 – Margareta Westesson (SK Poseidon)
- 1954 – Margareta Westesson (SK Poseidon)
- 1955 – Margareta Westesson (SK Poseidon)
- 1956 – Margareta Westesson (SK Poseidon)
- 1957 – Gull-Britt Jönsson (SK Poseidon)
- 1958 – Bibbi Segerström (SK Neptun)
- 1959 – Bibbi Segerström (SK Neptun)
- 1960 – Bibbi Segerström (SK Neptun)
- 1961 – Bibbi Segerström (SK Neptun)
- 1962 – Lena Bengtsson (SK Neptun)
- 1963 – Lena Bengtsson (SK Neptun)
- 1964 – Lena Bengtsson (SK Neptun)
- 1965 – Birgitta Haagman (Upsala S)
- 1966 – Birgitta Haagman (Upsala S)
- 1967 – Yvonne Törnqvist (Stockholmspolisens IF)
- 1968 – Britt-Marie Hammarsten (Robertsfors SS)
- 1969 – Eva Folkesson (Kristianstads SLS)
- 1970 – Eva Folkesson (Kristianstads SLS)
- 1971 – Anita Zarnowiecki (Simavdelningen 1902)
- 1972 – Diana Olsson (Stockholmspolisens IF)
- 1973 – Gunilla Lundberg (Umeå SS)
- 1974 – Gunilla Lundberg (Umeå SS)
- 1975 – Gunilla Lundberg (Umeå SS)
- 1976 – Gunilla Lundberg (Umeå SS)
- 1977 – Anette Lundström (SK GeMa)
- 1978 – Pensé Andersen (Landskrona SS)
- 1979 – Tina Gustafsson (Norrköpings KK)
- 1980 – Pensé Andersen (Landskrona SS)
- 1981 – Johanna Holmén (Västerås SS)
- 1982 – Johanna Holmén (Västerås SS)
- 1983 – Stina Enzell (Stockholmspolisens IF)
- 1984 – Sofia Kraft (Götene SS)
- 1985 – Sofia Kraft (SK Ran)
- 1986 – Anna-Karin Eriksson (Kalix SS)
- 1987 – Johanna Larsson (Mariestads SS)
- 1988 – Johanna Larsson (Mariestads SS)
- 1989 – Johanna Larsson (Mariestads SS)
- 1990 – Camilla Olsson (Malmö KK)
- 1991 – Annika Rasmusson (Malmö KK)
- 1992 – Annika Rasmusson (Malmö KK)
- 1993 – Camilla Johansson (Växjö SS)
- 1994 – Magdalena Schultz (Södertälje SS)
- 1995 – Camilla Johansson (Växjö SS)
- 1996 – Camilla Johansson (Växjö SS)
- 1997 – Camilla Johansson (Växjö SS)
- 1998 – Therese Alshammar (SK Neptun)
- 1999 – Therese Alshammar (SK Neptun)
- 2000 – Sofia Svensson (SK Poseidon)
- 2001 – Camilla Johansson (Trelleborgs SS)
- 2002 – Camilla Johansson (Trelleborgs SS)
- 2003 – Camilla Johansson (Trelleborgs SS)
- 2004 – Carin Möller (Kalmar SS)
- 2005 – Therese Svendsen (SK Ran)
- 2006 – Therese Svendsen (SK Ran)
- 2007 – Therese Svendsen (SK Ran)
- 2008 – Eleonor Lindborg (Trelleborg Kappsim)
- 2009 – Sandra Hafström (Helsingborgs S)
- 2010 – Sandra Hafström (Helsingborgs S)
- 2011 – Ida Lindborg (Malmö KK)
- 2012 – Therese Svendsen (SK Ran)
- 2013 – Therese Svendsen (SK Ran)
- 2014 – Michelle Coleman (Spårvägens SF)
- 2015 – Anna Åhlin (SK Neptun)
- 2016 – Hanna Rosvall (Ängelholms SS)
- 2017 – Hanna Rosvall (Ängelholms SS)
- 2018 – Hanna Rosvall (Ängelholms SS)
- 2019 – Michelle Coleman (Spårvägens SF)
- 2021 – Annie Hegmegi (Jönköpings SS)
- 2022 – Hanna Rosvall (Helsingborgs S)

=== 50 metre breaststroke ===
- 1990 – Louise Karlsson (Skärets SS)
- 1991 – Louise Karlsson (Skärets SS)
- 1992 – Louise Karlsson (Helsingborgs S)
- 1993 – Hanna Jaltner (Växjö SS)
- 1994 – Emma Igelström (Karlshamns SK)
- 1995 – Hanna Jaltner (Växjö SS)
- 1996 – Hanna Jaltner (Växjö SS)
- 1997 – Louise Karlsson (Skärets SS)
- 1998 – Maria Östling (Södertörns SS)
- 1999 – Maria Östling (Södertörns SS)
- 2000 – Emma Igelström (Spårvägens SF)
- 2001 – Emma Igelström (Spårvägens SF)
- 2002 – Emma Igelström (Spårvägens SF)
- 2003 – Emma Igelström (Spårvägens SF)
- 2004 – Maria Östling (Södertörns SS)
- 2005 – Rebecca Ejdervik (Täby Sim)
- 2006 – Rebecca Ejdervik (Täby Sim)
- 2007 – Hanna Westrin (Sundsvalls SS)
- 2008 – Rebecca Ejdervik (Täby Sim)
- 2009 – Magdalena Kuras (Malmö KK)
- 2010 – Jennie Johansson (Upsala S)
- 2011 – Jennie Johansson (Upsala S)
- 2012 – Rebecca Ejdervik (Täby Sim)
- 2013 – Jennie Johansson (SK Neptun)
- 2014 – Jennie Johansson (SK Neptun)
- 2015 – Sophie Hansson (Helsingborgs S)
- 2016 – Sophie Hansson (Helsingborgs S)
- 2017 – Sophie Hansson (Helsingborgs S)
- 2018 – Hannah Brunzell (Västerås SS) and Emelie Fast (Södertörns SS)
- 2019 – Emelie Fast (Södertörns SS)
- 2021 – Sophie Hansson (Helsingborgs S)
- 2022 – Klara Thormalm (Jönköpings SS)

=== 100 metre breaststroke ===
- 1954 – Berit Mattsson (Örebro SS)
- 1955 – Ulla-Britt Eklund (SK Neptun)
- 1956 – Berit Mattsson (Örebro SS)
- 1957 – Gun-Britt Mellberg (Brännans IF)
- 1958 – Elisabeth Hernth (SK Ägir)
- 1976 – Anette Fredriksson (Simavdelningen 1902)
- 1977 – Eva-Marie Håkansson (Kristianstads SLS)
- 1978 – Eva-Marie Håkansson (Kristianstads SLS)
- 1979 – Eva-Marie Håkansson (Kristianstads SLS)
- 1980 – Annelie Holmström (Stockholmspolisens IF)
- 1981 – Annelie Holmström (Stockholmspolisens IF)
- 1982 – Annelie Holmström (Stockholmspolisens IF)
- 1983 – Annelie Holmström (Stockholmspolisens IF)
- 1984 – Annelie Holmström (Stockholmspolisens IF)
- 1985 – Annelie Holmström (Stockholmspolisens IF)
- 1986 – Annelie Holmström (Stockholmspolisens IF)
- 1987 – Lisa Lönn (SS Mora)
- 1988 – Annelie Holmström (Stockholmspolisens IF)
- 1989 – Anna-Karin Persson (Kungälvs SS)
- 1990 – Louise Karlsson (Skärets SS)
- 1991 – Anna-Karin Persson (Mölndals ASS)
- 1992 – Louise Karlsson (Helsingborgs S)
- 1993 – Hanna Jaltner (Växjö SS)
- 1994 – Hanna Jaltner (Växjö SS)
- 1995 – Hanna Jaltner (Växjö SS)
- 1996 – Hanna Jaltner (Växjö SS)
- 1997 – Hanna Jaltner (Växjö SS)
- 1998 – Emma Igelström (Karlshamns SK)
- 1999 – Maria Östling (Södertörns SS)
- 2000 – Hanna Jaltner (Trelleborgs SS)
- 2001 – Emma Igelström (Spårvägens SF)
- 2002 – Emma Igelström (Spårvägens SF)
- 2003 – Emma Igelström (Spårvägens SF)
- 2004 – Maria Östling (Södertörns SS)
- 2005 – Jeanette Engzell (Falu SS)
- 2006 – Hanna Westrin (Sundsvalls SS)
- 2007 – Hanna Westrin (Sundsvalls SS)
- 2008 – Rebecca Ejdervik (Täby Sim)
- 2009 – Joline Höstman (Göteborg Sim)
- 2010 – Joline Höstman (Göteborg Sim)
- 2011 – Jennie Johansson (Upsala S)
- 2012 – Rebecca Ejdervik (Täby Sim)
- 2013 – Jennie Johansson (SK Neptun)
- 2014 – Jennie Johansson (SK Neptun)
- 2015 – Sophie Hansson (Helsingborgs S)
- 2016 – Sophie Hansson (Helsingborgs S)
- 2017 – Sophie Hansson (Helsingborgs S)
- 2018 – Hannah Brunzell (Västerås SS)
- 2019 – Klara Thormalm (Jönköpings SS)
- 2021 – Sophie Hansson (Helsingborgs S)
- 2022 – Klara Thormalm (Jönköpings SS)

=== 200 metre breaststroke ===
- 1959 – Margareta Winquist (SK Neptun)
- 1960 – Barbro Eriksson (Nyköpings SS)
- 1961 – Christina Olsson (Limhamns SS)
- 1962 – Christina Olsson (Limhamns SS)
- 1963 – Christina Olsson (Limhamns SS)
- 1964 – Monica Israelsson (Karlskrona SS)
- 1965 – Monica Israelsson (Karlskrona SS)
- 1966 – Monica Israelsson (Karlskrona SS)
- 1967 – Agneta Haraldsson (Lycksele SS)
- 1968 – Yvonne Brage (Skövde SS)
- 1969 – Yvonne Brage (Skövde SS)
- 1970 – Yvonne Brage (Skövde SS)
- 1971 – Monica Bergqvist (Stockholmspolisens IF)
- 1972 – Jeanette Petersson (IF Elfsborg)
- 1973 – Jeanette Petersson (Spårvägens GoIF)
- 1974 – Jeanette Petersson (SK Najaden)
- 1975 – Ann-Sofi Roos (Kristianstads SLS)
- 1976 – Ann-Sofi Roos (Kristianstads SLS)
- 1977 – Ann-Sofi Roos (Kristianstads SLS)
- 1978 – Eva-Marie Håkansson (Kristianstads SLS)
- 1979 – Ann-Sofi Roos (Kristianstads SLS)
- 1980 – Ann-Sofi Roos (Kristianstads SLS)
- 1981 – Annelie Holmström (Stockholmspolisens IF)
- 1982 – Annelie Holmström (Stockholmspolisens IF)
- 1983 – Annelie Holmström (Stockholmspolisens IF)
- 1984 – Annelie Holmström (Stockholmspolisens IF)
- 1985 – Annelie Holmström (Stockholmspolisens IF)
- 1986 – Annelie Holmström (Stockholmspolisens IF)
- 1987 – Helena Kälvehed (SK Korrugal)
- 1988 – Anna Rosengren (SS Mora)
- 1989 – Anna-Karin Persson (Kungälvs SS)
- 1990 – Charlotte Humling (Sandvikens SoHK)
- 1991 – Anna Jensen (Växjö SS)
- 1992 – Louise Karlsson (Helsingborgs S)
- 1993 – Hanna Jaltner (Växjö SS)
- 1994 – Lena Eriksson (Spårvägens SF)
- 1995 – Lena Eriksson (Spårvägens SF)
- 1996 – Maria Östling (SS Mora)
- 1997 – Lena Eriksson (Spårvägens SF)
- 1998 – Emma Igelström (Karlshamns SK)
- 1999 – Sara Nordenstam (Skärets SS)
- 2000 – Sara Nordenstam (Skärets SS)
- 2001 – Sara Nordenstam (Skärets SS)
- 2002 – Emma Igelström (Spårvägens SF)
- 2003 – Emma Igelström (Spårvägens SF)
- 2004 – Sara Larsson (Ludvika SS)
- 2005 – Sandra Jacobson (Täby Sim)
- 2006 – Hanna Westrin (Sundsvalls SS)
- 2007 – Joline Höglund (Göteborg Sim)
- 2008 – Joline Höstman (Göteborg Sim)
- 2009 – Joline Höstman (Göteborg Sim)
- 2010 – Joline Höstman (Göteborg Sim)
- 2011 – Joline Höstman (Mölndals ASS)
- 2012 – Joline Höstman (Mölndals ASS)
- 2013 – Joline Höstman (Mölndals ASS)
- 2014 – Jennie Johansson (SK Neptun)
- 2015 – Jessica Eriksson (Södertörns SS)
- 2016 – Sophie Hansson (Helsingborgs S)
- 2017 – Sophie Hansson (Helsingborgs S)
- 2018 – Hannah Brunzell (Västerås SS)
- 2019 – Hilja Schimmel (Skövde SS)
- 2021 – Sophie Hansson (Helsingborgs S)
- 2022 – Olivia Klint Ipsa (Kristianstads SLS)

=== 50 metre butterfly ===
- 1990 – Louise Karlsson (Skärets SS)
- 1991 – Louise Karlsson (Skärets SS)
- 1992 – Louise Karlsson (Helsingborgs S)
- 1993 – Linda Olofsson (Sundsvalls SS)
- 1994 – Linda Olofsson (Sundsvalls SS)
- 1995 – Linda Olofsson (Södertälje SS)
- 1996 – Linda Olofsson (Södertälje SS)
- 1997 – Johanna Sjöberg (Helsingborgs S)
- 1998 – Johanna Sjöberg (Helsingborgs S)
- 1999 – Anna-Karin Kammerling (Sundsvalls SS)
- 2000 – Anna-Karin Kammerling (Sundsvalls SS)
- 2001 – Anna-Karin Kammerling (Sundsvalls SS)
- 2002 – Anna-Karin Kammerling (Sundsvalls SS)
- 2003 – Anna-Karin Kammerling (Sundsvalls SS)
- 2004 – Anna-Karin Kammerling (Sundsvalls SS)
- 2005 – Anna-Karin Kammerling (Sundsvalls SS)
- 2006 – Therese Alshammar (SK Neptun)
- 2007 – Anna-Karin Kammerling (Sundsvalls SS)
- 2008 – Therese Alshammar (SK Neptun)
- 2009 – Therese Alshammar (SK Neptun)
- 2010 – Therese Alshammar (SK Neptun)
- 2011 – Louise Hansson (Helsingborgs S)
- 2012 – Louise Hansson (Helsingborgs S)
- 2013 – Sarah Sjöström (Södertörns SS)
- 2014 – Sarah Sjöström (Södertörns SS)
- 2015 – Sarah Sjöström (Södertörns SS)
- 2016 – Sarah Sjöström (Södertörns SS)
- 2017 – Sara Junevik (Falu SS)
- 2018 – Sara Junevik (Falu SS)
- 2019 – Sara Junevik (Falu SS)
- 2021 – Ida Liljeqvist (Helsingborgs S)
- 2022 – Sara Junevik (Falu SS)

=== 100 metre butterfly ===
- 1953 – Ulla-Britt Eklund (SK Neptun)
- 1959 – Kristina Larsson (SK Ran)
- 1960 – Kristina Larsson (SK Ran)
- 1961 – Karin Stenbäck (SK Neptun)
- 1962 – Karin Stenbäck (SK Neptun)
- 1963 – Karin Stenbäck (SK Neptun)
- 1964 – Lotten Andersson (Timrå AIF)
- 1965 – Lotten Andersson (Linköpings ASS)
- 1966 – Ingrid Gustavsson (Luleå SS)
- 1967 – Ingrid Gustavsson (Luleå SS)
- 1976 – Gunilla Andersson (SK Neptun)
- 1977 – Gunilla Andersson (SK Neptun)
- 1978 – Lena de Val (Linköpings ASS)
- 1979 – Agneta Mårtensson (Karlslunds IF)
- 1980 – Armi Airaksinen (Stockholmspolisens IF)
- 1981 – Agneta Eriksson (Västerås SS)
- 1982 – Agneta Eriksson (Västerås SS)
- 1983 – Agneta Eriksson (Västerås SS)
- 1984 – Agneta Eriksson (Västerås SS)
- 1985 – Agneta Eriksson (Västerås SS)
- 1986 – Agneta Eriksson (Västerås SS)
- 1987 – Agneta Eriksson (Västerås SS)
- 1988 – Annlo Edenholm (Södertörns SS)
- 1989 – Anna Lindberg (Kristianstads SLS)
- 1990 – Therèse Lundin (Simavdelningen 1902)
- 1991 – Malin Strömberg (Ystads SS)
- 1992 – Malin Strömberg (Ystads SS)
- 1993 – Ellenor Svensson (Norrköpings KK)
- 1994 – Ellenor Svensson (Norrköpings KK)
- 1995 – Johanna Sjöberg (Helsingborgs S)
- 1996 – Malin Svahnström (Väsby SS)
- 1997 – Johanna Sjöberg (Helsingborgs S)
- 1998 – Johanna Sjöberg (Helsingborgs S)
- 1999 – Johanna Sjöberg (Södertälje SS)
- 2000 – Johanna Sjöberg (Södertälje SS)
- 2001 – Johanna Sjöberg (Södertälje SS)
- 2002 – Johanna Sjöberg (Södertälje SS)
- 2003 – Anna-Karin Kammerling (Sundsvalls SS)
- 2004 – Johanna Sjöberg (Spårvägens SF)
- 2005 – Johanna Sjöberg (Spårvägens SF)
- 2006 – Anna-Karin Kammerling (Sundsvalls SS)
- 2007 – Petra Granlund (Väsby SS)
- 2008 – Sarah Sjöström (Södertörns SS)
- 2009 – Petra Granlund (Väsby SS)
- 2010 – Therese Alshammar (Täby Sim)
- 2011 – Sarah Sjöström (Södertörns SS)
- 2012 – Louise Hansson (Helsingborgs S)
- 2013 – Sarah Sjöström (Södertörns SS)
- 2014 – Sarah Sjöström (Södertörns SS)
- 2015 – Sarah Sjöström (Södertörns SS)
- 2016 – Sarah Sjöström (Södertörns SS)
- 2017 – Sara Junevik (Falu SS)
- 2018 – Ida Liljeqvist (Ängelholms SS)
- 2019 – Sara Junevik (Falu SS)
- 2021 – Ida Liljeqvist (Helsingborgs S)
- 2022 – Sara Junevik (Falu SS)

=== 200 metre butterfly ===
- 1968 – Ingrid Gustavsson (Luleå SS)
- 1969 – Ingrid Gustavsson (Luleå SS)
- 1970 – Eva Wikner (Stockholmspolisens IF)
- 1971 – Eva Wikner (Stockholmspolisens IF)
- 1972 – Eva Wikner (Stockholmspolisens IF)
- 1973 – Gunilla Andersson (SK Neptun)
- 1974 – Lena Johansson (Skellefteå-Rönnskärs SK)
- 1975 – Gunilla Andersson (SK Neptun)
- 1976 – Gunilla Andersson (SK Neptun)
- 1977 – Lena de Val (Linköpings ASS)
- 1978 – Lena de Val (Linköpings ASS)
- 1979 – Agneta Mårtensson (Karlslunds IF)
- 1980 – Armi Airaksinen (Stockholmspolisens IF)
- 1981 – Annelie Wennberg (Spårvägens GoIF)
- 1982 – Annelie Wennberg (Spårvägens GoIF)
- 1983 – Annelie Wennberg (Spårvägens GoIF)
- 1984 – Ann Carlsson (Malmö KK)
- 1985 – Eva Jonasson (Ölands SK)
- 1986 – Eva Jonasson (Ölands SK)
- 1987 – Annlo Edenholm (Södertörns SS)
- 1988 – Annlo Edenholm (Södertörns SS)
- 1989 – Carina Johansson (Oxelösunds SS)
- 1990 – Therèse Lundin (Simavdelningen 1902)
- 1991 – Mikaela Laurén (Stockholmspolisens IF)
- 1992 – Malin Strömberg (Ystads SS)
- 1993 – Christina Öhlund (Piteå Sim)
- 1994 – Mikaela Laurén (Södertälje SS)
- 1995 – Mikaela Laurén (SK Neptun)
- 1996 – Mikaela Laurén (SK Neptun)
- 1997 – Johanna Sjöberg (Helsingborgs S)
- 1998 – Destiny Laurén (SK Neptun)
- 1999 – Johanna Sjöberg (Södertälje SS)
- 2000 – Sara Nordenstam (Skärets SS)
- 2001 – Sara Nordenstam (Väsby SS)
- 2002 – Sara Nordenstam (Väsby SS)
- 2003 – Mia Brodén (Falu SS)
- 2004 – Johanna Sjöberg (Spårvägens SF)
- 2005 – Petra Granlund (S 77 Stenungsund)
- 2006 – Gabriella Fagundez (SK Ran)
- 2007 – Petra Granlund (Väsby SS)
- 2008 – Petra Granlund (Väsby SS)
- 2009 – Petra Granlund (Väsby SS)
- 2010 – Petra Granlund (Väsby SS)
- 2011 – Martina Granström (Jönköpings SS)
- 2012 – Martina Granström (Jönköpings SS)
- 2013 – Céline Bertrand (Skövde SS)
- 2014 – Sarah Sjöström (Södertörns SS)
- 2015 – Ida Marko-Varga (SK Triton)
- 2016 – Frida Berggren (Västerås SS)
- 2017 – Frida Berggren (Västerås SS)
- 2018 – Edith Jernstedt (Västerås SS)
- 2019 – Edith Jernstedt (Västerås SS)
- 2021 – Hanna Eriksson (Jönköpings SS)
- 2022 – Annie Hegmegi (Jönköpings SS)

=== 100 metre individual medley ===
- 1991 – Louise Karlsson (Skärets SS)
- 1992 – Louise Karlsson (Helsingborgs S)
- 1993 – Ulrika Jardfeldt (Turebergs IF)
- 1994 – Ulrika Jardfeldt (Turebergs IF)
- 1995 – Johanna Sjöberg (Helsingborgs S)
- 1996 – Veronika Andersson (Skärets SS)
- 1997 – Louise Karlsson (Skärets SS)
- 1998 – Kristina Sherman (Skärets SS)
- 1999 – Malin Svahnström (Väsby SS)
- 2000 – Therese Alshammar (SK Neptun)
- 2001 – Therese Alshammar (SK Neptun)
- 2002 – Therese Alshammar (SK Neptun)
- 2003 – Hanna Eriksson (Södertälje SS)
- 2004 – Hanna Eriksson (Södertälje SS)
- 2005 – Hanna Eriksson (Södertälje SS)
- 2006 – Hanna Eriksson (Södertälje SS)
- 2007 – Malin Svahnström (Väsby SS)
- 2008 – Josefin Lillhage (Väsby SS)
- 2009 – Therese Alshammar (Täby Sim)
- 2010 – Sarah Sjöström (Södertörns SS)
- 2011 – Martina Granström (Jönköpings SS)
- 2012 – Petra Granlund (Väsby SS)
- 2013 – Magdalena Kuras (SK Triton)
- 2014 – Magdalena Kuras (SK Triton)
- 2015 – Louise Hansson (Helsingborgs S)
- 2016 – Sarah Sjöström (Södertörns SS)
- 2017 – Vilma Ekström (Linköpings ASS)
- 2018 – Magdalena Kuras (SK Triton)
- 2019 – Magdalena Kuras (Malmö KK)
- 2021 – Emelie Fast (Södertörns SS)
- 2022 – Emelie Fast (Södertörns SS)

=== 200 metre individual medley ===
- 1959 – Kristina Larsson (SK Ran)
- 1960 – Karin Larsson (SK Ran)
- 1968 – Ingrid Gustavsson (Luleå SS)
- 1969 – Anita Zarnowiecki (Simavdelningen 1902)
- 1970 – Anita Zarnowiecki (Simavdelningen 1902)
- 1971 – Anita Zarnowiecki (Simavdelningen 1902)
- 1976 – Diana Olsson (Stockholmspolisens IF)
- 1977 – Anette Fredriksson (Simavdelningen 1902)
- 1978 – Anette Fredriksson (Simavdelningen 1902)
- 1979 – Ann-Sofi Roos (Kristianstads SLS)
- 1980 – Ann-Sofi Roos (Kristianstads SLS)
- 1981 – Anette Philipsson (Linköpings ASS)
- 1982 – Anette Philipsson (Linköpings ASS)
- 1983 – Maria Kardum (Kristianstads SLS)
- 1984 – Sofia Kraft (Götene SS)
- 1985 – Anette Philipsson (Linköpings ASS)
- 1986 – Helena Kälvehed (SK Korrugal)
- 1987 – Anette Philipsson (Linköpings ASS)
- 1988 – Anette Philipsson (Linköpings ASS)
- 1989 – Helena Kälvehed (SK Korrugal)
- 1990 – Malin Gustavsson (Kristianstads SLS)
- 1991 – Helena Kälvehed (Norrköpings KK)
- 1992 – Louise Karlsson (Helsingborgs S)
- 1993 – Ulrika Jardfeldt (Turebergs IF)
- 1994 – Magdalena Schultz (Södertälje SS)
- 1995 – Magdalena Schultz (Södertälje SS)
- 1996 – Malin Svahnström (Väsby SS)
- 1997 – Malin Svahnström (Väsby SS)
- 1998 – Malin Svahnström (Väsby SS)
- 1999 – Malin Svahnström (Väsby SS)
- 2000 – Sara Nordenstam (Skärets SS)
- 2001 – Sara Nordenstam (Skärets SS)
- 2002 – Sara Nordenstam (Väsby SS)
- 2003 – Hanna Eriksson (Södertälje SS)
- 2004 – Hanna Eriksson (Södertälje SS)
- 2005 – Malin Svahnström (Väsby SS)
- 2006 – Stina Gardell (Spårvägens SF)
- 2007 – Stina Gardell (Spårvägens SF)
- 2008 – Stina Gardell (Spårvägens SF)
- 2009 – Una Finnman (SK Ran)
- 2010 – Petra Granlund (Väsby SS)
- 2011 – Sarah Sjöström (Södertörns SS)
- 2012 – Petra Granlund (Väsby SS)
- 2013 – Louise Hansson (Helsingborgs S)
- 2014 – Louise Hansson (Helsingborgs S)
- 2015 – Louise Hansson (Helsingborgs S)
- 2016 – Sarah Sjöström (Södertörns SS)
- 2017 – Frida Berggren (Västerås SS)
- 2018 – Hanna Bergman (SK Poseidon)
- 2019 – Edith Jernstedt (Västerås SS)
- 2021 – Hanna Bergman (SK Poseidon)
- 2022 – Hanna Bergman (SK Poseidon)

=== 400 metre individual medley ===
- 1972 – Anita Zarnowiecki (Simavdelningen 1902)
- 1973 – Anita Zarnowiecki (Simavdelningen 1902)
- 1974 – Anita Zarnowiecki (Simavdelningen 1902)
- 1975 – Anita Zarnowiecki (Simavdelningen 1902)
- 1976 – Ann-Sofi Roos (Kristianstads SLS)
- 1977 – Ann-Sofi Roos (Kristianstads SLS)
- 1978 – Ann-Sofi Roos (Kristianstads SLS)
- 1979 – Ann-Sofi Roos (Kristianstads SLS)
- 1980 – Ann-Sofi Roos (Kristianstads SLS)
- 1981 – Anette Philipsson (Linköpings ASS)
- 1982 – Anette Philipsson (Linköpings ASS)
- 1983 – Sofia Kraft (SK Götene)
- 1984 – Sofia Kraft (SK Götene)
- 1985 – Sofia Kraft (SK Ran)
- 1986 – Anette Philipsson (Linköpings ASS)
- 1987 – Anette Philipsson (Linköpings ASS)
- 1988 – Anette Philipsson (Linköpings ASS)
- 1989 – Anette Philipsson (Linköpings ASS)
- 1990 – Andrea Bolin (Växjö SS)
- 1991 – Ann-Sofie Jönsson (Tunafors SK)
- 1992 – Ann-Sofie Jönsson (Tunafors SK)
- 1993 – Anna Nilsson (Södertälje SS)
- 1994 – Magdalena Schultz (Södertälje SS)
- 1995 – Mikaela Laurén (SK Neptun)
- 1996 – Malin Svahnström (Väsby SS)
- 1997 – Destiny Laurén (SK Neptun)
- 1998 – Malin Svahnström (Väsby SS)
- 1999 – Emely Zakrisson (Stockholms KK)
- 2000 – Sara Nordenstam (Skärets SS)
- 2001 – Sara Nordenstam (Väsby SS)
- 2002 – Sara Nordenstam (Väsby SS)
- 2003 – Malin Fredriksson (Kalmar SS)
- 2004 – Ann Berglund (Jönköpings SS)
- 2005 – Sara Thydén (Kalmar SS)
- 2006 – Sara Thydén (Kalmar SS)
- 2007 – Ida Sandin (Väsby SS)
- 2008 – Eva Berglund (Jönköpings SS)
- 2009 – Sara Thydén (Väsby SS)
- 2010 – Sara Thydén (Väsby SS)
- 2011 – Sara Thydén (Väsby SS)
- 2012 – Sara Thydén (Väsby SS)
- 2013 – Céline Bertrand (Skövde SS)
- 2014 – Frida Berggren (Västerås SS)
- 2015 – Stina Gardell (Spårvägens SF)
- 2016 – Frida Berggren (Västerås SS)
- 2017 – Frida Berggren (Västerås SS)
- 2018 – Edith Jernstedt (Västerås SS)
- 2019 – Edith Jernstedt (Västerås SS)
- 2021 – Lisa Nystrand (Väsby SS)
- 2022 – Lisa Nystrand (SK Neptun)

=== 4 × 50 metre freestyle relay ===
- 1953 – SK Neptun
- 1954 – SK Neptun
- 1955 – SK Neptun
- 1956 – SK Neptun
- 1957 – SK Neptun
- 1958 – SK Neptun (Anita Hellström, Jane Cederqvist, Tanya Nilsson & Bibbi Segerström)
- 1990 – Helsingborgs S
- 1991 – Malmö KK (Anna-Lena Nilsson, Annika Rasmusson, Malin Nilsson & Cecilia Kentell)
- 1992 – Helsingborgs S
- 1993 – Norrköpings KK (Ellenor Svensson, Petra Meuller, Viktoria Ekberg & Helena Kälvehed)
- 1994 – Södertälje SS (Magdalena Schultz, Sofi Nygren, Anna-Karin Rantzow & Susanne Lööw)
- 1995 – Södertälje SS (Linda Olofsson, Susanne Lööw, Sofi Nygren & Anna-Karin Rantzow)
- 1996 – Helsingborgs S
- 1997 – Helsingborgs S (Helena Åberg, Johanna Sjöberg, Anna Lindberg & Nelly Jörgensen)
- 1998 – Helsingborgs S (Johanna Sjöberg, Helena Åberg, Nelly Jörgensen & Anette Jönsson)
- 1999 – SK Neptun (Mia Ydfors, Kia Kilpinen, Jessica Lidström & Therese Alshammar)
- 2000 – Södertälje SS (Johanna Sjöberg, Linnea Tossavainen, Marianne Lionell & Hanna Eriksson)
- 2001 – Södertälje SS (Johanna Sjöberg, Marianne Lionell, Linnea Tossavainen & Hanna Eriksson)
- 2002 – Södertälje SS (Johanna Sjöberg, Hanna Eriksson, Marianne Lionell & Linnea Tossavainen)
- 2003 – Sundsvalls SS (Lorraine Flores, Anna-Karin Kammerling, Martina Lodin & Jenny Lindström)
- 2004 – Väsby SS (Gabriella Fagundez, Therese Mattsson, Josefin Lillhage & Denise Helgesson)
- 2005 – Väsby SS (Gabriella Fagundez, Malin Svahnström, Josefin Lillhage & Denise Helgesson)
- 2006 – SK Neptun (Annalena Hansson, Hanna Lundström, Cathrin Carlzon & Therese Alshammar)
- 2007 – Väsby SS (Petra Granlund, Therese Mattsson, Malin Svahnström & Ida Sandin)
- 2008 – Täby Sim (Lovisa Ericsson, Sofie Jansson, Therese Alshammar & Rebecca Ejdervik)
- 2009 – Väsby SS (Josefin Lillhage, Petra Granlund, Ida Sandin & Malin Svahnström)
- 2010 – Väsby SS (Petra Granlund, Josefin Lillhage, Gabriella Fagundez & Ida Sandin)
- 2011 – SK Triton (Henriette Brekke, Rebecca Holst, Ida Marko-Varga & Magdalena Kuras)
- 2012 – Väsby SS (Petra Granlund, Nadja Salomonsson, Josefin Lindkvist & Jaqueline Hippi)
- 2013 – Väsby SS (Petra Granlund, Jaqueline Hippi, Josefin Lindkvist & Nadja Salomonsson)
- 2014 – SK Triton (Alba Forés, Ida Marko-Varga, Magdalena Kuras & Linnéa Olsson)
- 2015 – SK Triton (Alba Forés, Ida Marko-Varga, Moa Ståhl & Magdalena Kuras)
- 2016 – Linköpings ASS (Sofia Henell, Caroline Palm, Emma Magnusson & Vilma Ekström)
- 2017 – Linköpings ASS (Rebecka Palm, Vilma Ekström, Sofia Henell & Caroline Palm)
- 2018 – Linköpings ASS (Rebecka Palm, Sofia Henell, Emma Magnusson & Caroline Palm)
- 2019 – Jönköpings SS (Alma Thormalm, Klara Thormalm, Annie Hegmegi & Hanna Eriksson)
- 2021 – Helsingborgs S (Alicia Lundblad, Sophie Hansson, Hanna Rosvall & Ida Liljeqvist)
- 2022 – Södertörns SS (Sarah Sjöström, Emelie Fast, Vilma Unnermark & Stella Svensson)

=== 4 × 100 metre freestyle relay ===
- 1959 – SK Neptun (Tanya Nilsson, Barbro Lundquist, Jane Cederqvist & Bibbi Segerström)
- 1960 – SK Neptun (Tanya Nilsson, Jane Cederqvist, Karin Stenbäck & Bibbi Segerström)
- 1961 – SK Neptun (Margareta Rylander, Jane Cederqvist, Karin Stenbäck & Bibbi Segerström)
- 1962 – SK Neptun (Ann-Christine Hagberg, Jane Cederqvist, Margareta Rylander & Karin Stenbäck)
- 1963 – SK Neptun
- 1964 – SK Neptun
- 1965 – SK Neptun
- 1966 – SK Neptun
- 1967 – Västerås SS
- 1968 – Västerås SS
- 1969 – Västerås SS (Marianne Hättning, Eva Enqvist, Ulla Fahlén & Inger Dovenstam)
- 1970 – Stockholms KK
- 1971 – Malmö S
- 1976 – Simavdelningen 1902
- 1977 – Kristianstads SLS
- 1978 – Kristianstads SLS
- 1979 – Kristianstads SLS (Lena Ekblom, Eva-Marie Håkansson, Anna Kardum & Ann-Sofi Roos)
- 1980 – Kristianstads SLS
- 1980 – Kristianstads SLS
- 1981 – Stockholmspolisens IF
- 1982 – Stockholmspolisens IF
- 1983 – Stockholmspolisens IF (Helen Ögren, Maja-Lena Deckner, Armi Airaksinen & Ylva Noring)
- 1984 – Stockholmspolisens IF
- 1985 – Kristianstads SLS
- 1986 – Kristianstads SLS
- 1987 – Kristianstads SLS (Anna Hansen, Malin Gustavsson, Maria Norberg & Maria Kardum)
- 1988 – Kristianstads SLS
- 1989 – Helsingborgs S (Anna Hansen, Britt-Marie Nilsson, Helena Åberg & Suzanne Nilsson)
- 1990 – Malmö KK
- 1991 – Malmö KK (Anna-Lena Nilsson, Annika Rasmusson, Malin Nilsson & Cecilia Kentell)
- 1992 – Helsingborgs S
- 1993 – Norrköpings KK (Petra Meuller, Viktoria Ekberg, Helena Kälvehed & Ellenor Svensson)
- 1994 – Södertälje SS (Magdalena Schultz, Susanne Lööw, Sofi Nygren & Anna-Karin Rantzow)
- 1995 – Södertälje SS (Magdalena Schultz, Susanne Lööw, Linda Olofsson & Anna-Karin Rantzow)
- 1996 – Helsingborgs S
- 1997 – Helsingborgs S (Johanna Sjöberg, Helena Åberg, Anna Lindberg & Nelly Jörgensen)
- 1998 – SK Neptun (Jessica Udström, Annelie Andersson, Destiny Laurén & Therese Alshammar)
- 1999 – Malmö KK (Lotta Wänberg, Jenny Redlund, Camilla Helgesson & Lisa Wänberg)
- 2000 – SK Neptun (Jessica Lidström, Mia Ydfors, Annelie Andersson & Therese Alshammar)
- 2001 – Trelleborgs SS (Caroline Steffensen, Emma Pålsson, Ida Mattsson & Sandra Steffensen)
- 2002 – Södertälje SS (Johanna Sjöberg, Hanna Eriksson, Marianne Lionell & Linnea Tossavainen)
- 2003 – Väsby SS (Gabriella Fagundez, Josefin Lillhage, Denise Helgesson & Therese Mattsson)
- 2004 – Väsby SS (Therese Mattsson, Josefin Lillhage, Gabriella Fagundez & Denise Helgesson)
- 2005 – Väsby SS (Therese Mattsson, Josefin Lillhage, Gabriella Fagundez & Malin Svahnström)
- 2006 – Väsby SS (Ida Sandin, Josefin Lillhage, Malin Svahnström & Petra Granlund)
- 2007 – Väsby SS (Ida Sandin, Therese Mattsson, Malin Svahnström & Petra Granlund)
- 2008 – Väsby SS (Ida Sandin, Josefin Lillhage, Petra Granlund & Malin Svahnström)
- 2009 – Väsby SS (Malin Svahnström, Petra Granlund, Josefin Lillhage & Ida Sandin)
- 2010 – Väsby SS (Petra Granlund, Josefin Lillhage, Ida Sandin & Gabriella Fagundez)
- 2011 – Väsby SS (Josefin Lindkvist, Ida Sandin, Petra Granlund & Gabriella Fagundez)
- 2012 – Väsby SS (Petra Granlund, Josefin Lindkvist, Jaqueline Hippi & Nadja Salomonsson)
- 2013 – Väsby SS (Petra Granlund, Jaqueline Hippi, Josefin Lindkvist & Nadja Salomonsson)
- 2014 – SK Triton (Moa Ståhl, Ida Marko-Varga, Linnéa Olsson & Magdalena Kuras)
- 2015 – SK Triton (Moa Ståhl, Ida Marko-Varga, Alba Forés & Magdalena Kuras)
- 2016 – Malmö KK (Nathalie Lindborg, Alba Forés, Emma Johansson & Ida Lindborg)
- 2017 – Linköpings ASS (Rebecka Palm, Sofia Henell, Caroline Palm & Vilma Ekström)
- 2018 – Linköpings ASS (Rebecka Palm, Emma Magnusson, Caroline Palm & Sofia Henell)
- 2019 – Jönköpings SS (Alma Thormalm, Klara Thormalm, Wilma Johansson & Hanna Eriksson)
- 2021 – Helsingborgs S (Sophie Hansson, Alicia Lundblad, Emilia Rönningdal & Hanna Rosvall)
- 2022 – Södertörns SS (Emelie Fast, Sarah Sjöström, Stella Svensson & Vilma Unnermark)

=== 4 × 200 metre freestyle relay ===
- 1972 – Kristianstads SLS
- 1973 – SK Najaden
- 1974 – Kristianstads SLS
- 1975 – SK Najaden
- 1976 – Borlänge SS
- 1977 – Borlänge SS
- 1978 – Kristianstads SLS
- 1979 – Kristianstads SLS
- 1980 – Kristianstads SLS
- 1981 – Västerås SS (Johanna Holmén, Eva Pia Alm, Birgitta Jönsson & Agneta Eriksson)
- 1982 – Stockholmspolisens IF
- 1983 – Stockholmspolisens IF (Annlo Arktoft, Helen Ögren, Stina Enzell, Armi Aikraksinen)
- 1984 – Stockholmspolisens IF (Helen Ögren, Annlo Arktoft, Ylva Noring & Armi Airaksinen)
- 1985 – Kristianstads SLS
- 1986 – Kristianstads SLS
- 1987 – Kristianstads SLS (Anna Hansen, Malin Gustavsson, Maria Norberg & Maria Kardum)
- 1988 – Kristianstads SLS
- 1989 – Helsingborgs S (Anna Hansen, Helena Åberg, Britt-Marie Nilsson & Suzanne Nilsson)
- 1994 – Malmö KK
- 1995 – Södertälje SS (Magdalena Schultz, Anna-Karin Rantzow, Linda Olofsson & Susanne Lööw)
- 1996 – Simavdelningen 1902
- 1997 – Helsingborgs S (Johanna Sjöberg, Nelly Jörgensen, Helena Åberg & Anna Lindberg)
- 1998 – Malmö KK (Jenny Redlund, Lisa Wänberg, Lotta Wänberg & Camilla Helgesson)
- 1999 – Malmö KK (Lotta Wänberg, Lisa Wänberg, Jenny Redlund & Camilla Helgesson)
- 2000 – SK Neptun (Jessica Lidström, Mia Ydfors, Annelie Andersson & Destiny Laurén)
- 2001 – Malmö KK (Linn Akkad, Linda Erlandsson, Jenny Redlund & Helen Svensson)
- 2002 – Väsby SS (Josefin Lillhage, Sara Nordenstam, Gabriella Fagundez & Denise Helgesson)
- 2003 – SK Neptun (Minna Ahonpää, Therese Alshammar, Destiny Laurén & Mia Ydfors)
- 2004 – Malmö KK (Lotta Wänberg, Lisa Wänberg, Ida Mattsson & Maria Öberg)
- 2005 – Väsby SS (Therese Mattsson, Josefin Lillhage, Gabriella Fagundez & Malin Svahnström)
- 2006 – Väsby SS (Ida Sandin, Josefin Lillhage, Malin Svahnström & Petra Granlund)
- 2007 – SK Ran (Nelly Nilsson, Gabriella Fagundez, Ida Marko-Varga & Therese Svendsen)
- 2008 – Väsby SS (Malin Svahnström, Josefin Lillhage, Petra Granlund & Ida Sandin)
- 2009 – Väsby SS (Malin Svahnström, Josefin Lillhage, Petra Granlund & Sara Thydén)
- 2010 – Väsby SS (Gabriella Fagundez, Josefin Lillhage, Petra Granlund & Ida Sandin)
- 2011 – Väsby SS (Sara Thydén, Gabriella Fagundez, Petra Granlund & Ida Sandin)
- 2012 – Helsingborgs S (Sandra Hafström, Rebecka Ekelund, Louise Hansson & Maria Lundahl)
- 2013 – Väsby SS (Josefine Hippi, Josefin Lindkvist, Jaqueline Hippi & Nadja Salomonsson)
- 2014 – Väsby SS (Josefin Lindkvist, Jaqueline Hippi, Josefine Hippi & Nadja Salomonsson)
- 2015 – SK Triton (Alba Forés, Ida Marko-Varga, Moa Ståhl & Magdalena Kuras)
- 2016 – Spårvägens SF (Emma Wahlström, Michelle Coleman, Stina Gardell & Emma Sundstedt)
- 2017 – Linköpings ASS (Sofia Henell, Rebecka Palm, Caroline Palm & Vilma Ekström)
- 2018 – Jönköpings SS (Hanna Eriksson, Alice Müllern, Johanna Pettersson & Wilma Johansson)
- 2019 – Jönköpings SS (Hanna Eriksson, Wilma Johansson, Annie Hegmegi & Moa Holmquist)
- 2021 – Jönköpings SS (Moa Holmquist, Annie Hegmegi, Hanna Eriksson & Tova Magnusson)
- 2022 – SK Elfsborg (Sofia Åstedt, Emma Varga, Amanda Böhrén & Thilda Häll)

=== 4 × 50 metre medley relay ===
- 1994 – Södertälje SS (Magdalena Schultz, Charlotte Humling, Anna-Karin Rantzow & Susanne Lööw)
- 1995 – Spårvägens SF
- 1996 – Helsingborgs S
- 1997 – Helsingborgs S (Nelly Jörgensen, Anna Kideborn, Johanna Sjöberg & Helena Åberg)
- 1998 – Södertälje SS (Lisa Nilsson, Linnea Tossavainen, Anna-Karin Rantzow & Susanne Lööw)
- 1999 – Spårvägens SF (Emelie Kierkegaard, Emma Igelström, Anna Gustavsson & Louise Jöhncke)
- 2000 – SK Neptun (Ulrika Jardfeldt, Malou Serneholt, Therese Alshammar & Mia Ydfors)
- 2001 – Södertälje SS (Hanna Eriksson, Marianne Lionell, Johanna Sjöberg & Linnea Tossavainen)
- 2002 – Södertälje SS (Hanna Eriksson, Marianne Lionell, Johanna Sjöberg & Linnea Tossavainen)
- 2003 – Sundsvalls SS (Jenny Lindström, Emma Svanbäck, Anna-Karin Kammerling & Lorraine Flores)
- 2004 – Malmö KK (Emma Holmquist, Sanja Dizdarevic, Lena Hallander & Lisa Wänberg)
- 2005 – Spårvägens SF (Emelie Kierkegaard, Stina Mittermaier, Johanna Sjöberg & Stina Gardell)
- 2006 – Sundsvalls SS (Jenny Lindström, Hanna Westrin, Anna-Karin Kammerling & Alexandra Johansson) (Note: SK Neptun finished first, but was disqualified when Ebba Nyberg tested positive for doping.)
- 2007 – Sundsvalls SS (Alexandra Johansson, Hanna Westrin, Anna-Karin Kammerling & Josefina Lockner)
- 2008 – Täby Sim (Lovisa Ericsson, Rebecca Ejdervik, Therese Alshammar & Sofie Jansson)
- 2009 – Väsby SS (Sara Thydén, Josefin Lillhage, Petra Granlund & Malin Svahnström)
- 2010 – Väsby SS (Petra Granlund, Nadja Salomonsson, Gabriella Fagundez & Josefin Lillhage)
- 2011 – Väsby SS (Petra Granlund, Sara Thydén, Gabriella Fagundez & Josefin Lindkvist)
- 2012 – Täby Sim (Michelle Coleman, Rebecca Ejdervik, Mathilda Johansson & Lovisa Ericsson)
- 2013 – Täby Sim (Michelle Coleman, Rebecca Ejdervik, Frida Nilsson & Mathilda Johansson)
- 2014 – Södertörns SS (Lovisa Klarén, Jessica Eriksson, Sarah Sjöström & Vilma Unnermark)
- 2015 – Helsingborgs S (Louise Hansson, Sophie Hansson, Matilda Weiler & Sandra Hafström)
- 2016 – Malmö KK (Ida Lindborg, Emma Jansson, Emma Johansson & Nathalie Lindborg)
- 2017 – Linköpings ASS (Caroline Palm, Vilma Ekström, Rebecka Palm & Sofia Henell)
- 2018 – Ängelholms SS (Hanna Rosvall, Sandra Lendt, Ida Liljeqvist & Miranda Ingvarsson)
- 2019 – Helsingborgs S (Hanna Rosvall, Nelly Rasmusson, Julia Stenhård & Alicia Lundblad)
- 2021 – Helsingborgs S (Hanna Rosvall, Sophie Hansson, Ida Liljeqvist & Alicia Lundblad)
- 2022 – Helsingborgs S (Hanna Rosvall, Ebba Holgersson, Ida Liljeqvist & Vega Vollmer)

=== 4 × 100 metre medley relay ===
- 1968 – Stockholmspolisens IF
- 1969 – Stockholmspolisens IF (Yvonne Hiljebäck, Anna-Lena Jönsson, Eva Wikner & Lena Isaksson)
- 1970 – Stockholmspolisens IF
- 1971 – Stockholmspolisens IF
- 1972 – Stockholmspolisens IF
- 1973 – SK Najaden
- 1974 – SK Najaden
- 1975 – SK Najaden
- 1976 – Simavdelningen 1902
- 1977 – Kristianstads SLS
- 1978 – Kristianstads SLS
- 1979 – Stockholmspolisens IF
- 1980 – Kristianstads SLS
- 1981 – Västerås SS
- 1982 – Stockholmspolisens IF
- 1983 – Stockholmspolisens IF (Stina Enzell, Annelie Holmström, Armi Airaksinen & Maja-Lena Deckner)
- 1984 – Stockholmspolisens IF
- 1985 – SK Ran
- 1986 – Stockholmspolisens IF (Stina Enzell, Annelie Holmström, Armi Airaksinen & Marja Haglund)
- 1987 – Mariestads SS (Johanna Larsson, Sofia Kraft, Eva Hjelm & Eva Nyberg)
- 1988 – Kristianstads SLS
- 1989 – Kristianstads SLS (Nina Hansen, Sofia Hjort, Anna Lindberg & Malin Gustavsson)
- 1990 – Malmö KK
- 1991 – Malmö KK (Annika Rasmusson, Charlotta Grunditz, Anna-Lena Nilsson & Malin Nilsson)
- 1992 – Helsingborgs S
- 1993 – Växjö SS
- 1994 – Södertälje SS (Magdalena Schultz, Charlotte Humling, Anna-Karin Rantzow & Susanne Lööw)
- 1995 – Växjö SS
- 1996 – Helsingborgs S
- 1997 – Helsingborgs S (Nelly Jörgensen, Anna Kideborn, Johanna Sjöberg & Helena Åberg)
- 1998 – Väsby SS (Mirja Knappstein, Marie Lindeborg, Ulrika Larsson & Malin Svahnström)
- 1999 – Södertälje SS (Lisa Nilsson, Linnea Tossavainen, Johanna Sjöberg & Sofi Nygren)
- 2000 – Trelleborgs SS (Camilla Johansson, Hanna Jaltner, Emma Pålsson & Sandra Steffensen)
- 2001 – Trelleborgs SS (Camilla Johansson, Hanna Jaltner, Ida Mattsson & Sandra Steffensen)
- 2002 – Väsby SS (Denise Helgesson, Sara Nordenstam, Gabriella Fagundez & Josefin Lillhage)
- 2003 – Sundsvalls SS (Emma Wallin, Emma Svanbäck, Jenny Lindström & Anna-Karin Kammerling)
- 2004 – SK Neptun (Therese Alshammar, Katarina Tour, Mikaela Laurén & Minna Ahonpää)
- 2005 – Väsby SS (Malin Svahnström, Elin Törnbladh, Gabriella Fagundez & Josefin Lillhage)
- 2006 – SK Ran (Therese Svendsen, Caroline Drab, Gabriella Fagundez & Ida Marko-Varga)
- 2007 – SK Ran (Therese Svendsen, Caroline Drab, Gabriella Fagundez & Ida Marko-Varga)
- 2008 – Täby Sim (Lovisa Ericsson, Rebecca Ejdervik, Therese Alshammar & Sofie Jansson)
- 2009 – Väsby SS (Sara Thydén, Josefin Lillhage, Petra Granlund & Malin Svahnström)
- 2010 – Väsby SS (Petra Granlund, Sara Thydén, Gabriella Fagundez & Josefin Lillhage)
- 2011 – Väsby SS (Petra Granlund, Sara Thydén, Gabriella Fagundez & Josefin Lindkvist)
- 2012 – Helsingborgs S (Sandra Hafström, Sofia Johansson, Louise Hansson & My Fridell)
- 2013 – Helsingborgs S (Sandra Hafström, Sophie Hansson, Louise Hansson & Maria Lundahl)
- 2014 – SK Triton (Magdalena Kuras, Moa Ståhl, Ida Marko-Varga & Alba Forés)
- 2015 – Helsingborgs S (Sandra Hafström, Sophie Hansson, Louise Hansson & Matilda Weiler)
- 2016 – Spårvägens SF (Michelle Coleman, Stina Gardell, Emma Sundstedt & Emma Wahlström)
- 2017 – Linköpings ASS (Caroline Palm, Vilma Ekström, Rebecka Palm & Sofia Henell)
- 2018 – Linköpings ASS (Caroline Palm, Rebecka Palm, Sofia Henell & Emma Magnusson)
- 2019 – Helsingborgs S (Hanna Rosvall, Nelly Rasmusson, Rebecca Hesslevik & Alicia Lundblad)
- 2021 – Helsingborgs S (Hanna Rosvall, Sophie Hansson, Ida Liljeqvist & Alicia Lundblad)
- 2022 – Helsingborgs S (Hanna Rosvall, Ebba Holgersson, Ida Liljeqvist & Vega Vollmer)

== Discontinued events ==
=== 4 × 100 metre backstroke relay ===
- 1961 – SK Neptun (Birgitta Friberg, Margit Öhman, Monica Öberg & Bibbi Segerström)
- 1962 – SK Neptun (Ulla Jacobsson, Margit Öhman, Lena Bengtsson & Birgitta Friberg)
- 1963 – SK Neptun
- 1964 – Malmö S
- 1965 – Malmö S
- 1966 – Upsala S

=== 4 × 100 metre breaststroke relay ===
- 1961 – Nyköpings SS (Lisbeth Jansson, Kristina Kallerhult, Maud Gustavsson & Barbro Eriksson)
- 1962 – Malmö S (Mariian Sjöström, Lena Ström, Lisbet Sandgren & Ulla Kristina Lindsjö)
- 1963 – Malmö S
- 1964 – Malmö S
- 1965 – SK Poseidon
- 1966 – Bodens BK
- 1967 – SK GeMa

=== 4 × 100 metre butterfly relay ===
- 1961 – SK Ran (Barbro Andersson, Karin Larsson, Nin Persson & Kristina Larsson)
- 1962 – SK Neptun (Jane Cederqvist, Birgitta Friberg, Birgitta Lundqvist & Karin Stenbäck)
- 1963 – SK Neptun
- 1964 – SK Neptun
- 1965 – Gävle SS
- 1966 – Upsala S
- 1967 – Gävle SS
