= 2006 Swedish Short Course Swimming Championships =

- Host city: Uppsala, Sweden
- Date(s): 23–26 November 2006
- Venue(s): Fyrishov
- Teams: 65
- Events: 44

The 2006 Swedish Short Course Swimming Championships took place in Fyrishov, Uppsala on 23–26 November 2006. 44 champions were declared and three national records, eight national junior records, 16 championship records, and seven national club relay records were set.

== Medal table ==
Rank	Nation	Gold	Silver	Bronze	Total
1	SK Neptun	8	4	3	15
2	Linköpings ASS	6	5	7	18
3	Väsby SS	5	7	2	14
4	SK Ran	5	3	3	11
5	Sundsvalls SS	4	2	1	7
6	Malmö KK	3	4	4	11
7	Norrköpings KK	3	1	1	5
8	Jönköpings SS	2	3	1	6
9	Spårvägens SF	2	2	3	7
10	Södertörns SS	2	0	1	3
11	Kalmar SS	1	4	0	5
12	Trelleborgs SS	1	2	1	4
13	Södertälje SS	1	2	0	3
14	Täby Sim	1	0	1	2
15	Ystads SS	0	1	4	5
16	Göteborg Sim	0	1	2	3
17	Helsingborgs SS	0	1	1	2
17	Stockholms KK	0	1	1	2
19	SK Götene	0	1	0	1
20	Upsala SS	0	0	4	4
21	Oskarshamns SS	0	0	1	1
21	SK Sydsim	0	0	1	1
21	Sjöbo SS	0	0	1	1
21	Trelleborg Kappsim	0	0	1	1
Totals (24 entries)		44	44	44	132

== Medalists ==
- NR denotes National Record
- CR denotes Championship Record

=== Men's ===
Event	Gold		Silver		Bronze	
50 m freestyle	Stefan Nystrand; SK Neptun	21.70; CR	Petter Stymne; SK Neptun	21.90	Marcus Piehl; Linköpings ASS	21.99
100 m freestyle	Jonas Tilly; Trelleborgs SS	48.29	Marcus Piehl; Linköpings ASS	48.35	Jonas Persson; Malmö KK	48.92
200 m freestyle	Jonas Persson; Malmö KK	1:45.26	Jonas Tilly; Trelleborgs SS	1:48.36	Christoffer Wikström; Upsala SS	1:48.40
400 m freestyle	Johan Claar; Jönköpings SS	3:54.45	Pontus Ericsson; Trelleborgs SS	3:54.61	Christoffer Wallin; Helsingborgs SS	3:56.92
1500 m freestyle	Johan Claar; Jönköpings SS	15:28.21	Christoffer Wallin; Helsingborgs SS	15:32.60	Adam Olsson; Trelleborgs SS	15:44.48
50 m backstroke	Per Nylin; Norrköpings KK	25.23	Jens Petersson; Stockholms KK	25.55	Konstantin Sundin; Spårvägens SF	25.80
100 m backstroke	Simon Sjödin; Södertörns SS	54.78	Konstantin Sundin; Spårvägens SF	55.43	Jens Petersson; Stockholms KK	55.62
200 m backstroke	Konstantin Sundin; Spårvägens SF	2:00.14	Mattias Carlsson; SK Götene	2:01.90	Niklas Gustafsson; Oskarshamns SS	2:02.32
50 m breaststroke	Per Nylin; Norrköpings KK	27.44	Martin Gustavsson; Malmö KK	27.57	Jakob Dorch; Linköpings ASS	27.94
100 m breaststroke	Martin Gustavsson; Malmö KK	59.02; NR, CR	Per Nylin; Norrköpings KK	1:00.50	Jakob Dorch; Linköpings ASS	1:00.85
200 m breaststroke	Martin Gustavsson; Malmö KK	2:08.97	Elias Lindskog; Ystads SS	2:15.35	Joakim Tell; Ystads SS	2:18.06
50 m butterfly	Lars Frölander; Linköpings ASS	23.66; CR	Marcus Piehl; Linköpings ASS	24.06	Erik Andersson; Linköpings ASS	24.49
100 m butterfly	Lars Frölander; Linköpings ASS	52.27	Erik Andersson; Linköpings ASS	53.13	Erik Dorch; Linköpings ASS	54.54
200 m butterfly	Simon Sjödin; Södertörns SS	1:59.04	Johan Claar; Jönköpings SS	2:02.12	Samba Sjödin; SK Neptun	2:02.96
100 m individual medley	Per Nylin; Norrköpings KK	54.85	Erik Dorch; Linköpings ASS	55.40	Sebastian Wikström; Upsala SS	56.14
200 m individual medley	Axel Pettersson; SK Neptun	2:00.18; NR, CR	Erik Samuelsson; Väsby SS	2:00.40	Rasmus Regnstrand; SK Neptun	2:02.33
400 m individual medley	Axel Pettersson; SK Neptun	4:19.60	Erik Samuelsson; Väsby SS	4:23.39	Martin Persson; Malmö KK	4:25.96
4 × 50 m freestyle relay	SK Neptun (22.76) Pontus Flodqvist (21.16) Stefan Nystrand (21.95) Johan Wallberg (22.06) Petter Stymne	1:27.93; CR	Linköpings ASS I (21.99) Marcus Piehl (21.92) Lars Frölander (21.95) Erik Dorch (22.22) Erik Andersson	1:28.08	Linköpings ASS II (23.04) Kristofer Johansson (22.49) Hans Albrektsson (22.28) Jacob Nordin (22.84) Klas Wiréhn	1:30.65
4 × 100 m freestyle relay	Linköpings ASS (48.80) Marcus Piehl (48.49) Erik Andersson (48.77) Erik Dorch (47.61) Lars Frölander	3:13.67; CR	SK Neptun (48.82) Petter Stymne (46.71) Stefan Nystrand (49.22) Johan Wallberg (50.13) Peter Edvardsson	3:14.88	Upsala SS (49.21) Christoffer Wikström (48.55) Sebastian Wikström (51.03) Jonas Ekman (50.66) Tomas Andersson	3:19.45
4 × 200 m freestyle relay	Linköpings ASS (1:48.21) Erik Andersson (1:49.73) Lars Frölander (1:48.08) Marcus Piehl (1:51.36) Kristofer Johansson	7:17.38	SK Neptun (1:50.49) Peter Edvardsson (1:51.19) Axel Pettersson (1:46.96) Stefan Nystrand (1:49.91) Petter Stymne	7:18.55	Malmö KK (1:45.11) Jonas Persson (1:52.96) Tobias Lindbom (1:52.85) Sten-Olof Gustafsson (1:52.06) Martin Gustavsson	7:22.98
4 × 50 m medley relay	Linköpings ASS (25.93) Marcus Piehl (27.42) Jakob Dorch (23.14) Lars Frölander (22.02) Erik Dorch	1:38.51; CR	Malmö KK (27.05) Ola Fagerstrand (27.12) Martin Gustavsson (24.17) Daniel Carlsson (21.53) Jonas Persson	1:39.87	Norrköpings KK (27.00) Michael Kostesic (26.62) Per Nylin (24.64) David Gustafsson (22.70) Björn Gunnarsson	1:40.96
4 × 100 m medley relay	Linköpings ASS (56.61) Erik Andersson (1:00.63) Jakob Dorch (51.60) Lars Frölander (48.22) Marcus Piehl	3:37.06; CR	Malmö KK (57.41) Sten-Olof Gustafsson (58.86) Martin Gustavsson (55.64) Daniel Carlsson (47.40) Jonas Persson	3:39.31	SK Neptun (56.96) Petter Stymne (1:02.65) Niklas Tour (54.36) Axel Pettersson (47.71) Stefan Nystrand	3:41.68

=== Women's ===
Event	Gold		Silver		Bronze	
50 m freestyle	Therese Alshammar; SK Neptun	24.17; CR	Anna-Karin Kammerling; Sundsvalls SS	24.78	Magdalena Kuras; Malmö KK	24.99
100 m freestyle	Josefin Lillhage; Väsby SS	53.84	Magdalena Kuras; Malmö KK	54.76	Ida Marko-Varga; SK Ran	54.80
200 m freestyle	Josefin Lillhage; Väsby SS	1:55.58	Petra Granlund; Väsby SS	1:58.73	Ida Marko-Varga; SK Ran	1:58.79
400 m freestyle	Josefin Lillhage; Väsby SS	4:05.89	Gabriella Fagundez; SK Ran	4:08.25	Linda Jönsson; Ystads SS	4:15.27
800 m freestyle	Gabriella Fagundez; SK Ran	8:40.98	Eva Berglund; Jönköpings SS	8:44.10	Linda Jönsson; Ystads SS	8:47.15
50 m backstroke	Therese Alshammar; SK Neptun	28.00; CR	Therese Svendsen; SK Ran	28.53	Anna-Karin Kammerling; Sundsvalls SS	28.61
100 m backstroke	Therese Svendsen; SK Ran	1:00.88	Carin Möller; Kalmar SS	1:00.98	Lina Edlund; Jönköpings SS	1:02.31
200 m backstroke	Therese Svendsen; SK Ran	2:08.92; NR, CR	Carin Möller; Kalmar SS	2:08.99	Eleonor Lindborg; Trelleborg Kappsim	2:12.45
50 m breaststroke	Rebecca Ejdervik; Täby Sim	31.61	Hanna Eriksson; Södertälje SS	31.67	Jennie Johansson; Upsala SS	32.06
100 m breaststroke	Hanna Westrin; Sundsvalls SS	1:08.38	Hanna Eriksson; Södertälje SS	1:08.93	Joline Höglund; Göteborg Sim	1:09.51
200 m breaststroke	Hanna Westrin; Sundsvalls SS	2:26.66	Joline Höglund; Göteborg Sim	2:29.77	Josefin Wede; SK Sydsim	2:29.82
50 m butterfly	Therese Alshammar; SK Neptun	25.53	Anna-Karin Kammerling; Sundsvalls SS	25.61	Cecilia Rasmuson; Täby Sim	27.08
100 m butterfly	Anna-Karin Kammerling; Sundsvalls SS	57.70	Johanna Sjöberg; Spårvägens SF	59.25	Ida Marko-Varga; SK Ran	59.76
200 m butterfly	Gabriella Fagundez; SK Ran	2:09.87	Petra Granlund; Väsby SS	2:11.51	Sandra Nilsson; Sjöbo SS	2:13.74
100 m individual medley	Hanna Eriksson; Södertälje SS	1:01.16; CR	Sara Thydén; Kalmar SS	1:01.98	Ida Sandin; Väsby SS	1:03.15
200 m individual medley	Stina Gardell; Spårvägens SF	2:13.30; CR	Sara Thydén; Kalmar SS	2:13.38	Ida Sandin; Väsby SS	2:16.13
400 m individual medley	Sara Thydén; Kalmar SS	4:41.43	Ida Sandin; Väsby SS	4:42.74	Linda Jönsson; Ystads SS	4:45.16
4 × 50 m freestyle relay	SK Neptun (26.36) Annalena Hanson (25.30) Hanna Lundström (25.66) Cathrin Carlzon (23.98) Therese Alshammar	1:41.30	Väsby SS (26.65) Therese Mattsson (24.36) Josefin Lillhage (25.95) Petra Granlund (25.05) Malin Svahnström	1:42.01	Spårvägens SF (25.26) Johanna Sjöberg (25.94) Stina Gardell (26.39) Natasha Sundin (25.99) Sofie Gardell	1:43.58
4 × 100 m freestyle relay	Väsby SS (56.82) Ida Sandin (52.63) Josefin Lillhage (55.83) Malin Svahnström (55.05) Petra Granlund	3:39.88; CR	SK Neptun (53.77) Therese Alshammar (56.81) Annalena Hanson (55.93) Hanna Lundström (56.66) Cathrin Carlzon	3:43.17	Södertörns SS (57.60) Fanny D. Lillieström (56.37) Susannah Moonan (56.89) Sarah Sjöström (55.93) Cecilia Sjöholm	3:46.79
4 × 200 m freestyle relay	Väsby SS (2:02.08) Ida Sandin (1:57.01) Josefin Lillhage (2:01.13) Malin Svahnström (1:59.72) Petra Granlund	7:59.94	Jönköpings SS (2:03.63) Eva Berglund (2:01.59) Martina Granström (2:03.89) Ann Berglund (2:01.30) Lina Edlund	8:10.41	Linköpings ASS (2:04.40) Sanna Öhgren (2:03.41) Astrid Armgarth (2:03.68) Emilia Nilsson (2:05.08) Sara Crifält	8:16.57
4 × 50 m medley relay	Sundsvalls SS (30.87) Jenny Lindström (31.22) Hanna Westrin (25.32) Anna-Karin Kammerling (25.80) Alexandra Johansson	1:53.21	SK Ran (28.89) Therese Svendsen (32.10) Caroline Drab (27.29) Gabriella Fagundez (25.53) Ida Marko-Varga	1:53.81	Göteborg Sim (29.29) Elin Harnebrandt (32.17) Joline Höglund (28.36) Josefine Walker (24.50) Claire Hedenskog	1:54.32
4 × 100 m medley relay	SK Ran (1:00.41) Therese Svendsen (1:10.42) Caroline Drab (59.58) Gabriella Fagundez (54.37) Ida Marko-Varga	4:04.78; CR	Väsby SS (1:04.33) Malin Svahnström (1:10.35) Ida Sandin (1:00.22) Petra Granlund (53.10) Josefin Lillhage	4:08.00	Spårvägens SF (1:02.69) Natasha Sundin (1:11.35) Ida Nilsson (1:01.00) Sofie Gardell (54.64) Johanna Sjöberg	4:09.68
