= 2008 Swedish Short Course Swimming Championships =

- Host city: Stockholm, Sweden
- Date(s): November 27 – November 30
- Venue(s): Eriksdalsbadet
- Teams: 71
- Events: 44

The 2008 Swedish Short Course Swimming Championships took place in Eriksdalsbadet, Sweden between November 27, 2008 and November 30, 2008. 44 champions were declared.

== Medal table ==
Rank	Team	Gold	Silver	Bronze	Total
1	SK Neptun	9	2	6	17
2	Täby Sim	9	1	0	10
3	Väsby SS	6	7	2	15
4	Jönköpings SS	4	3	2	9
5	Linköpings ASS	3	5	3	11
6	Malmö KK	3	1	0	4
7	Göteborg Sim	2	5	3	10
8	Norrköpings KK	2	2	1	5
9	Spårvägens SF	2	1	3	6
10	Helsingborgs SS	1	4	4	9
11	Södertörns SS	1	2	2	5
11	Uddevalla Sim	1	2	2	5
13	Trelleborg Kappsim	1	1	0	2
14	Karlskrona SS	0	2	0	2
15	SK Poseidon	0	1	1	2
15	Upsala SS	0	1	1	2
15	Österlen Sim	0	1	1	2
18	Mölndals ASS	0	1	0	1
18	SK Laxen	0	1	0	1
18	Södertälje SS	0	1	0	1
21	Sundsvalls SS	0	0	6	6
22	Oskarshamns SS	0	0	2	2
23	Karlskoga SF	0	0	1	1
23	SS Iden	0	0	1	1
23	Sjöbo SS	0	0	1	1
23	Stockholmspolisens IF	0	0	1	1
23	Ystads SS	0	0	1	1
Totals (27 entries)		44	44	44	132

== Medalists ==
- NR denotes National Record
- CR denotes Championship Record

=== Men's ===
Event	Gold		Silver		Bronze	
50 m freestyle	Marcus Piehl; Linköpings ASS	21.71	Mathias Hageneier; SK Laxen	22.04	Pontus Flodqvist; SK Neptun	22.41
100 m freestyle	Corentin Poels; Göteborg Sim	48.48	Christoffer Wikström; Upsala SS	48.61	Radovan Siljevski; SK Neptun	49.02
200 m freestyle	Radovan Siljevski; SK Neptun	1:46.61	Robin Andréasson; Mölndals ASS	1:47.08	Christoffer Wikström; Upsala SS	1:47.17
400 m freestyle	Simon Sjödin; SK Neptun	3:49.10	Mattias Carlsson; Uddevalla Sim	3:49.28	Linus Junefelt; Jönköpings SS	3:49.46
1500 m freestyle	Christoffer Wallin; Helsingborgs SS	15:27.54	Gustav Åberg Lejdström; Helsingborgs SS	15:41.14	Niklas Gustafsson; Oskarshamns SS	15:48.19
50 m backstroke	Michael Kostesic; Norrköpings KK	25.36	Oscar Vilsmyr; Göteborg Sim	25.60	Konstantin Sundin; Spårvägens SF	25.62
100 m backstroke	Konstantin Sundin; Spårvägens SF	54.72	Michael Kostesic; Norrköpings KK	54.95	Måns Hjelm; SS Iden	55.49
200 m backstroke	Mattias Carlsson; Uddevalla Sim	1:57.65	Linus Junefelt; Jönköpings SS	1:57.66	Konstantin Sundin; Spårvägens SF	2:00.53
50 m breaststroke	Martin Gustavsson; Malmö KK	27.13; CR	Guillermo Solis Herraiz; SK Poseidon	27.61	Niklas Tour; SK Neptun	27.66
100 m breaststroke	Martin Gustavsson; Malmö KK	59.44	Niklas Tour; SK Neptun	1:00.85	Christer Tour; SK Neptun	1:01.12
200 m breaststroke	Martin Gustavsson; Malmö KK	2:09.29	Anton Lagerqvist; Ystads SS	2:12.91	Elias Lindskog; Ystads SS	2:14.25
50 m butterfly	Lars Frölander; Linköpings ASS	23.49; CR	Henrik Lindau; Karlskrona SS	23.91	Erik Andersson; Linköpings ASS	23.92
100 m butterfly	Erik Andersson; Linköpings ASS	52.60	Henrik Lindau; Karlskrona SS	53.79	David Larsson; Uddevalla Sim	54.57
200 m butterfly	Linus Junefelt; Jönköpings SS	1:57.88	Christoffer Wallin; Helsingborgs SS	1:59.35	Mattias Carlsson; Uddevalla Sim	2:00.05
100 m individual medley	Per Nylin; Norrköpings KK	54.51; CR	Michael Kostesic; Norrköpings KK	55.94	Guillermo Solis Herraiz; SK Poseidon	55.98
200 m individual medley	Simon Sjödin; SK Neptun	1:59.53	Simon Frank; SK Neptun	2:01.93	Niklas Gustafsson; SK Neptun	2:05.32
400 m individual medley	Simon Sjödin; SK Neptun	4:13.08	Christoffer Wallin; Helsingborgs SS	4:15.08	Linus Junefelt; Jönköpings SS	4:21.65
4 × 50 m freestyle relay	SK Neptun (22.37) Pontus Flodqvist (20.85) Stefan Nystrand (21.85) Radovan Siljevski (21.76) Petter Stymne	1:26.83; CR	Linköpings ASS (21.84) Marcus Piehl (21.58) Lars Frölander (22.76) Klas Wiréhn (22.62) Jacob Nordin	1:28.80	Norrköpings KK (22.82) Michael Kostesic (21.54) Per Nylin (22.35) Björn Gunnarsson (22.76) Nikola Stojmenovic	1:29.47
4 × 100 m freestyle relay	SK Neptun I (49.67) Pontus Flodqvist (49.55) Radovan Siljevski (45.77) Stefan Nystrand (48.04) Simon Sjödin	3:13.03	Linköpings ASS (48.63) Marcus Piehl (48.14) Erik Andersson (47.79) Hans Albrektsson (49.50) Lars Frölander	3:14.06	SK Neptun II (49.12) Petter Stymne (49.50) Peter Edvardsson (50.00) Alexander Nyström (51.19) Kristoffer Brander	3:19.81
4 × 200 m freestyle relay	SK Neptun (1:47.78) Radovan Siljevski (1:47.98) Simon Sjödin (1:52.39) Simon Frank (1:50.48) Peter Edvardsson	7:18.63	Uddevalla Sim (1:47.36) Mattias Carlsson (1:50.37) Jesper Svensson (1:50.66) David Larsson (1:53.50) Emil Palmqvist	7:21.89	Helsingborgs SS (1:52.57) Gustav Åberg Lejdström (1:48.49) Christoffer Wallin (1:50.78) Henrik Sjöholm (1:52.17) Christian Helgesson	7:24.01
4 × 50 m medley relay	SK Neptun (24.96) Simon Sjödin (27.37) Niklas Tour (23.94) Radovan Siljevski (21.07) Stefan Nystrand	1:37.34	Linköpings ASS I (26.82) Carl Holmertz (27.91) Kristofer Johansson (23.14) Lars Frölander (21.30) Marcus Piehl	1:38.77	Linköpings ASS II (26.78) Joachim Wiking (27.88) Richard Piehl (23.17) Erik Andersson (22.06) Hans Albrektsson	1:39.89
4 × 100 m medley relay	SK Neptun I (53.67) Simon Sjödin (1:01.15) Niklas Tour (54.27) Radovan Siljevski (46.11) Stefan Nystrand	3:35.20	Linköpings ASS (57.24) Joachim Wiking (1:02.16) Kristofer Johansson (51.30) Erik Andersson (48.01) Marcus Piehl	3:38.71	SK Neptun III (55.11) Alexander Nyström (59.74) Jonas Andersson (54.94) Stefan Holm (51.00) Rasmus Regnstrand	3:40.79

=== Women's ===
Event	Gold		Silver		Bronze	
50 m freestyle	Therese Alshammar; Täby Sim	23.80; CR	Josefin Lillhage; Väsby SS	24.49	Sarah Sjöström; Södertörns SS	24.92
100 m freestyle	Josefin Lillhage; Väsby SS	53.14; CR	Sarah Sjöström; Södertörns SS	53.49	Claire Hedenskog; Göteborg Sim	53.65
200 m freestyle	Petra Granlund; Väsby SS	1:55.63	Nathalie Lindborg; Trelleborg KS	2:00.51	Rebecka Ekelund; Helsingborgs SS	2:01.34
400 m freestyle	Eva Berglund; Jönköpings SS	4:12.27	Ida Sandin; Väsby SS	4:12.61	Rebecka Ekelund; Helsingborgs SS	4:14.99
800 m freestyle	Eva Berglund; Jönköpings SS	8:41.59	Rebecka Palm; Linköpings ASS	8:56.63	Rebecka Ekelund; Helsingborgs SS	9:00.75
50 m backstroke	Lovisa Ericsson; Täby Sim	27.42; NR, CR	Magdalena Kuras; Malmö KK	27.77	Alexandra Johansson; Sundsvalls SS	28.90
100 m backstroke	Lovisa Ericsson; Täby Sim	59.56; NR, CR	Sandra Hafström; Helsingborgs SS	1:01.43	Eljena Knutsson; Österlen Sim	1:01.90
200 m backstroke	Eleonor Lindborg; Trelleborg KS	2:10.80	Eljena Knutsson; Österlen Sim	2:11.95	Sandra Nilsson; Sjöbo SS	2:13.75
50 m breaststroke	Rebecca Ejdervik; Täby Sim	30.61	Joline Höstman; Göteborg Sim	31.02	Hanna Westrin; Sundsvalls SS	31.22
100 m breaststroke	Rebecca Ejdervik; Täby Sim	1:06.50	Joline Höstman; Göteborg Sim	1:06.52	Hanna Westrin; Sundsvalls SS	1:07.78
200 m breaststroke	Joline Höstman; Göteborg Sim	2:22.02	Stina Gardell; Spårvägens SF	2:29.25	Jenny Falkeman-Brink; SK Sydsim	2:29.27
50 m butterfly	Therese Alshammar; Täby Sim	25.44	Sarah Sjöström; Södertörns SS	25.88	Cecilia Rasmuson; Sundsvalls SS	26.49
100 m butterfly	Sarah Sjöström; Södertörns SS	56.91; NR, CR	Petra Granlund; Väsby SS	57.12	Cecilia Rasmuson; Sundsvalls SS	59.30
200 m butterfly	Petra Granlund; Väsby SS	2:06.70; CR	Martina Granström; Jönköpings SS	2:10.62	Michaela Ahlin; Stockholmspolisens IF	2:12.49
100 m individual medley	Josefin Lillhage; Väsby SS	59.84; NR, CR	Hanna Eriksson; Södertälje SS	1:00.46	Malin Svahnström; Väsby SS	1:01.40
200 m individual medley	Stina Gardell; Spårvägens SF	2:12.26; CR	Malin Svahnström; Väsby SS	2:12.52	Ida Sandin; Väsby SS	2:12.92
400 m individual medley	Eva Berglund; Jönköpings SS SS	4:39.89	Ida Sandin; Väsby SS	4:40.08	Stina Gardell; Spårvägens SF	4:40.51
4 × 50 m freestyle relay	Täby Sim (25.19) Lovisa Ericsson (25.00) Sofie Jansson (23.23) Therese Alshammar (25.72) Rebecca Ejdervik	1:39.14; CR	Väsby SS (24.44) Josefin Lillhage (24.51) Petra Granlund (25.15) Malin Svahnström (25.22) Ida Sandin	1:39.32	Linköpings ASS (26.05) Frida Jakobsson (25.42) Rebecka Palm (26.30) Caroline Palm (26.28) Sara Crifält	1:44.05
4 × 100 m freestyle relay	Väsby SS (56.30) Ida Sandin (52.24) Josefin Lillhage (53.33) Petra Granlund (55.05) Malin Svahnström	3:36.92; CR	Täby Sim (54.70) Lovisa Ericsson (56.13) Sofie Jansson (51.88) Therese Alshammar (58.08) Elin Lindström	3:40.79	Södertörns SS (53.79) Claire Hedenskog (58.08) Elin Harnebrandt (56.97) Isabelle Höstman (57.53) Caroline Bornius	3:46.37
4 × 200 m freestyle relay	Väsby SS (2:00.92) Malin Svahnström (1:57.10) Josefin Lillhage (1:55.14) Petra Granlund (1:58.77) Ida Sandin	7:51.93; CR	Jönköpings SS (2:02.24) Eva Berglund (2:00.36) Lina Edlund (2:06.04) Beatrice Andersson (2:00.73) Martina Granström	8:09.37	Södertörns SS (2:03.74) Jeanette Björklund (1:57.20) Sarah Sjöström (2:04.81) Joanna Olsson (2:06.42) Anna Lillieström	8:12.17
4 × 50 m medley relay	Täby Sim (27.71) Lovisa Ericsson (30.13) Rebecca Ejdervik (24.59) Therese Alshammar (25.68) Sofie Jansson	1:48.11; CR	Göteborg Sim (29.11) Elin Harnebrandt (30.61) Joline Höstman (27.25) Isabelle Höstman (23.93) Claire Hedenskog	1:50.90	Sundsvalls SS (29.31) Alexandra Johansson (30.74) Hanna Westrin (26.39) Cecilia Rasmuson (26.55) Josefina Lockner	1:52.99
4 × 100 m medley relay	Täby Sim (1:00.33) Lovisa Ericsson (1:05.92) Rebecca Ejdervik (57.36) Therese Alshammar (55.27) Sofie Jansson	3:58.88; CR	Väsby SS (1:04.01) Malin Svahnström (1:10.11) Ida Sandin (56.62) Petra Granlund (52.72) Josefin Lillhage	4:03.46	Göteborg Sim (1:03.05) Elin Harnebrandt (1:06.00) Joline Höstman (1:02.24) Isabelle Höstman (52.69) Claire Hedenskog	4:03.98

== See also ==
- 2008 in swimming
