= Airaksinen =

Airaksinen is a Finnish surname. Notable people with the surname include:

- Armi Airaksinen (born 1962), Swedish swimmer
- Pekka Airaksinen (1945–2019), Finnish composer
- Timo Airaksinen (born 1947), Finnish philosopher
