= Camilla Johansson =

Camilla Johansson may refer to:

- Camilla Johansson (curler) (born 1971), Swedish curler now competing as Camilla Noréen
- Camilla Johansson (swimmer) (born 1974), Olympic swimmer
- Camilla Johansson (triple jumper) (born 1976), Olympic triple jumper
