= Hanna Eriksson (swimmer, born 1999) =

Swedish swimmer

Personal information
- Born: 12 April 1999 (age 27)

Sport
- Sport: Swimming
- Club: Jönköpings SS

Hanna Eriksson (born 12 April 1999) is a Swedish freestyle swimmer. Eriksson represents Jönköpings SS.

Eriksson participated, representing Sweden, in four individual events and a relay at the 2015 European Games in Baku. In 2019, she represented Sweden at the 2019 World Aquatics Championships held in Gwangju, South Korea. She competed in the women's 800 metre freestyle. She did not advance to the final. She also competed in the women's 4 × 100 metre freestyle relay event heats, but was substituted to the finals by Sophie Hansson.

At the 2021 Swedish Short Course Swimming Championships, she won four individual Swedish championship titles.
