= Arne Jutner =

Swedish water polo player

Personal information
- Full name: Ernst Arne Jutner
- Nationality: Swedish
- Born: 6 October 1920; Stockholm, Sweden
- Died: 8 November 2009 (aged 89); Stockholm, Sweden

Sport
- Sport: Water polo

Ernst Arne Jutner (6 October 1920 – 8 November 2009) was a Swedish water polo player. He competed at the 1948 Summer Olympics and the 1952 Summer Olympics.

At club level, Jutner represented SoIK Hellas and Stockholmspolisens IF.
