= Kristianstads SLS =

Swimming association in Sweden

Club information
- Full name: Kristianstads Sim- & Livräddningssällskap
- Short name: KSLS
- City: Kristianstad
- Founded: 28 August 1928; 97 years ago
- Home pool: Tivolibadet

Kristianstads Sim- & Livräddningssällskap, commonly known as Kristianstads SLS or KSLS, is a swimming club based in Kristianstad.

== History ==
Kristiantads SLS was founded on 28 August 1928. From the beginning they swam outdoors in Helge å. Kristianstads SLS was for several years in the 1970s and 1980s Sweden's most successful swimming club. It was under the leadership of Tommy Malmsten, swimmer and in the 1980s coach of the national team that the successes were won.

The first swimmer in the national elite was Eva Folkesson. Folkesson won 7 Swedish championship gold medals in 100 metre and 200 metre backstroke 1969–1971, five at the long course championships and two at the short course championships. The next swimmer in the Swedish elite was long-distance swimmer Else Gunsten. She participated at the 1969 Swedish Swimming Championships at the age of twelve. She became the Swedish champion in the 800 metre freestyle six times in the early 1970s.

One of the big stars was Eva-Marie Håkansson, a breaststroke swimmer who participated in the 1980 and 1984 Summer Olympics, and won a bronze medal at the 1977 European Aquatics Championships in 200 metre breaststroke Another of the big stars was Ann-Sofi Roos who were a breaststroke and individual medley swimmer. She won 24 individual Swedish championship medals 1975–1980 in 100 metre breaststroke, 200 metre breaststroke, 200 metre individual medley and 400 metre individual medley. Kristianstads SLS had won 78 Swedish championship titles in women's events until 1985.

A later successful swimmer was Maria Kardum, who won Swedish championship gold in the 100 metre freestyle and 200 metre individual medley. Kardum also participated in the 1984 Olympics in Los Angeles. On the men's side, they have won fewer, but still about twenty Swedish Championship golds.

Tommy Malmsten now runs a very successful company in the swimming industry in Åhus.

== Swimmers ==
Swimmers that have participated in the Summer Olympics while representing Kristianstads SLS:

- Eva-Marie Håkansson
- Maria Kardum
- Ove Nylén
- Mikael Örn
- Ann-Sofi Roos
