= Anders Grillhammar =

Swedish swimmer

Personal information
- Born: September 7, 1964 (age 61) Stockholm, Sweden

Sport
- Sport: Swimming
- Club: Stockholmspolisens IF

Anders Grillhammar (born 7 September 1964) is a former Swedish freestyle swimmer. Grillhammar participated in the 1984 Summer Olympics, competing in the 400m freestyle, where he finished 21st.

== Clubs ==
- Stockholmspolisens IF
