= Magdalena Kuras =

Swedish swimmer (born 1988)

Personal information
- Full name: Magdalena Kuras
- Nationality: Swedish
- Born: 14 May 1988 (age 38)

Sport
- Sport: Swimming
- Strokes: Freestyle
- Club: Malmö KK
Medal record
Women's swimming
Representing Sweden
European Championships (LC)
Gold medal – first place	2014 Berlin	4×100 m freestyle
Bronze medal – third place	2008 Eindhoven	4×100 m freestyle
European Championships (SC)
Silver medal – second place	2015 Netanya	4×50 m medley
Bronze medal – third place	2013 Herning	4×50 m freestyle

Magdalena Kuras (born 14 May 1988) is a Swedish freestyle swimmer representing Malmö KK. She represented Sweden in the 2007 World Aquatics Championships, where she swam the 100 m freestyle and the 4 × 100 m freestyle relay and in the 2008 European Aquatics Championships, where she won a bronze medal in the 4 × 100 m freestyle relay along with Claire Hedenskog, Josefin Lillhage, Ida Marko-Varga.

== Personal bests ==
=== Long course (50 m) ===
Event	Time		Date	Meet	Location	Ref
50 m freestyle	25.57		6 Jun 2009	Gran Premi Internacional Ciutat de Barcelona	Barcelona, Spain	
100 m freestyle	55.98		16 Jun 2009	Stockholm Regional Championships	Stockholm, Sweden	
200 m freestyle	2:04.99		11 Mar 2006	Swedish Grand Prix	Stockholm, Sweden	
50 m butterfly	27.17	(h)	2 Jul 2009	Swedish Championships	Linköping, Sweden	

Legend: WR – World record; ER – European record; NR – Swedish record;
Records not set in finals: h – heat; sf – semifinal; r – relay 1st leg; rh – relay heat 1st leg; b – B final; † – en route to final mark; so – swim-off; tt – time trial

=== Short course (25 m) ===
Event	Time		Date	Meet	Location	Ref
50 m freestyle	24.90	(sf)	10 Dec 2006	European SC Championships	Helsinki, Finland	
100 m freestyle	54.20		28 Nov 2009	Swedish SC Championships	Gothenburg, Sweden	
200 m freestyle	1:59.18		26 Nov 2009	Swedish SC Championships	Gothenburg, Sweden	
50 m backstroke	27.60		11 Nov 2008	World Cup	Stockholm, Sweden	
50 m butterfly	26.59		27 Nov 2009	Swedish SC Championships	Gothenburg, Sweden	

Legend: WR – World record; ER – European record; NR – Swedish record;
Records not set in finals: h – heat; sf – semifinal; r – relay 1st leg; rh – relay heat 1st leg; b – B final; † – en route to final mark; so – swim-off; tt – time trial

== Clubs ==
- Malmö KK
