= Annelie Holmström =

Swedish swimmer

Personal information
- Born: 10 January 1964 (age 62) Stockholm, Sweden

Sport
- Sport: Swimming

Annelie Birgitta Holmström (born 10 January 1964) is a breaststroke Swedish swimmer. She competed in two events at the 1984 Summer Olympics.

Holmström represented Stockholmspolisens IF.
