= Suzanne Nilsson =

Swedish swimmer

Medal record

Women's Swimming

Representing Sweden

European Championships (LC)
Bronze medal – third place	1985 Sofia	4×200 m freestyle

Suzanne Nilsson (born 25 October 1966) is a former Swedish Olympic swimmer. She competed in the 1988 Summer Olympics, where she swam the 200 m freestyle and the 4×100 m freestyle relay.

== Clubs ==
- Helsingborgs SS
