= Bibbi Segerström =

Swedish swimmer

Personal information
- Born: 12 June 1943; Linköping, Sweden
- Died: 31 October 2014 (aged 71)
- Height: 1.69 m (5 ft 7 in)
- Weight: 58 kg (128 lb)

Sport
- Sport: Swimming
- Club: SK Neptun, Stockholm

Bibbi Gunilla Segerström (12 June 1943 – 31 October 2014) was a Swedish swimmer. She competed at the 1960 Summer Olympics in the 400 m freestyle and 4 × 100 m freestyle relay and finished eighth and sixth, respectively. After marriage, she changed her last name to Dobkousky.
