= Karin Furuhed =

Swedish swimmer

Personal information
- Born: May 9, 1967 (age 59) Ovanåker, Gävleborg County

Sport
- Sport: Swimming
- Club: Borlänge SS

Karin Margareta Furuhed (born 9 May 1967) is a former freestyle swimmer from Sweden. She competed in the 1984 Summer Olympics and in the 1988 Summer Olympics. Her best individual result is a 24th place in the 50 m freestyle (1988).

== Clubs ==
- Borlänge SS
