= Jeanette Pettersson =

Swedish swimmer (born 1956)

Personal information
- Born: 19 June 1956 Gothenburg, Sweden
- Height: 1.76 m (5 ft 9 in)
- Weight: 67 kg (148 lb)

Sport
- Sport: Swimming
- Club: SK Elfsborg, Borås
Medal record
Women's swimming
Representing Sweden
European Championships
Bronze medal – third place	1974 Vienna	4×100 m medley

Jeanette Sandra Marie Pettersson (born 19 June 1956) is a retired Swedish swimmer who won a bronze medal at the 1974 European Aquatics Championships. She competed in the 100 m and 200 m breaststroke events at the 1972 Summer Olympics but was eliminated in the preliminaries.
