= Hanna Jaltner =

Swedish swimmer

Personal information
- Full name: Hanna Maria Jaltner
- Born: 16 June 1976 (age 50) Stockholm, Sweden
Medal record
Women's swimming
Representing Sweden
European Championships (SC)
Bronze medal – third place	1996 Rostock	50 m breaststroke
Bronze medal – third place	1996 Rostock	4 x 50 m medley relay

Hanna Maria Jaltner (born 16 June 1976) is a former breaststroke swimmer from Sweden. She competed for her native country at the 1996 Summer Olympics in Atlanta, Georgia, in the Women's 100 m breaststroke (16th place) and the Women's 4x100 m medley relay (10th place). She was affiliated with the University of California, Berkeley.

== Clubs ==
- Växjö SS
