= Petra Granlund =

Swedish swimmer

Personal information
- Full name: Petra Granlund
- Nationality: Sweden
- Born: 15 October 1987 (age 38) Katrineholm, Sweden
- Height: 5 ft 8 in (1.73 m)
- Weight: 66 kg (146 lb)

Sport
- Sport: Swimming
- Strokes: Butterfly
- Club: Väsby SS
Medal record
Women's swimming
Representing Sweden
World Championships (SC)
Bronze medal – third place	2010 Dubai	200 m butterfly
European Championships (SC)
Gold medal – first place	2008 Rijeka	200 m butterfly
Silver medal – second place	2008 Rijeka	4×50 m freestyle
Silver medal – second place	2009 Istanbul	200 m butterfly

Petra Granlund (now Petra Sandberg) born 15 October 1987 is a Swedish swimmer from Valla, representing Väsby SS. Granlund participated in the 2008 Summer Olympics for Sweden in the 200 m butterfly and in the 4 × 200 m freestyle relay. She finished 14th in the 200 m butterfly and 8th in the 4×200 freestyle relay, alongside Josefin Lillhage, Gabriella Fagundez and Ida Marko-Varga.

== Clubs ==
- S77 Stenungsund
- Väsby SS
