= Sara Thydén =

Swedish swimmer

Personal information
- Born: June 26, 1989 (age 37) Kalmar, Sweden

Sport
- Sport: Swimming
- Strokes: Freestyle, medley
- Club: Kalmar SS

Sara Thydén (born 26 June 1989) is a Swedish swimmer from Kalmar, representing Kalmar SS. She is the Swedish Junior Record holder in 200 m individual medley. She finished 5th in 400 m IM at the 2005 European Junior Swimming Championships.

== Clubs ==
- Kalmar SS
