= Sofia Svensson =

Swedish politician (1873–1923)

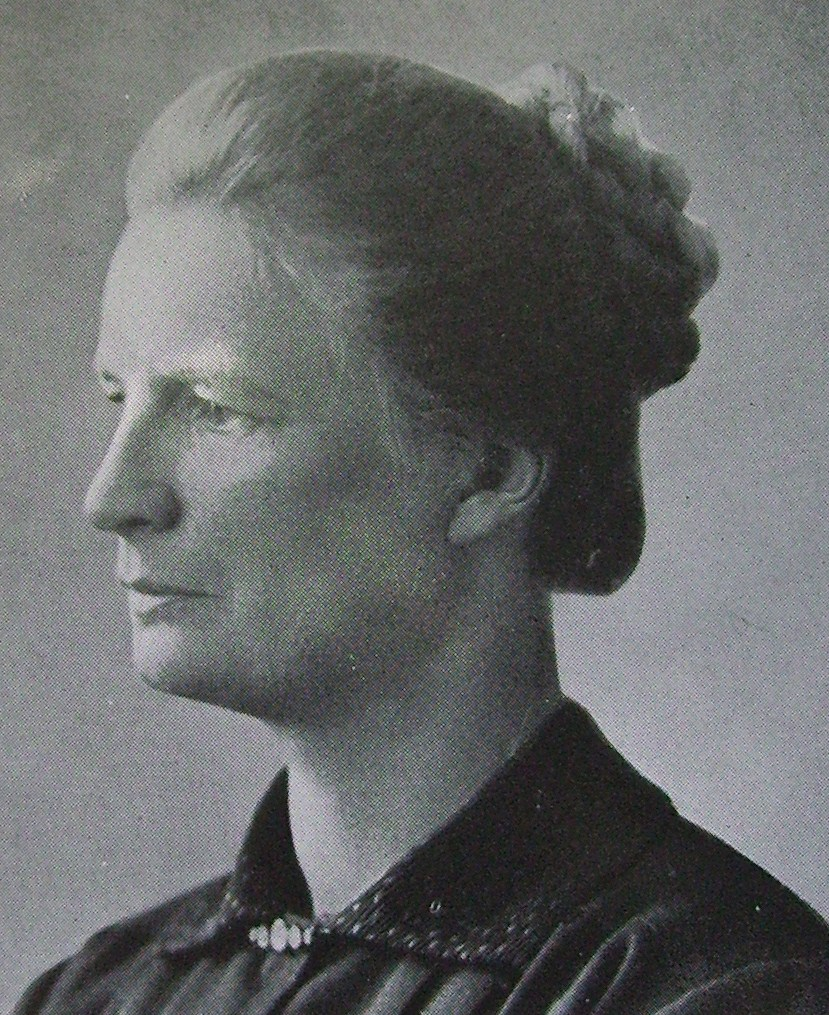
Svensson in 1937

Sofia Svensson (1873–1923), known as Röda Sofia (Red Sofia), was a Swedish communist politician.

She was a professional school teacher.

She was a suffragist and a member of the Gothenburg branch of the National Association for Women's Suffrage.

She was a member of the Gothenburg City Council in 1922 until her death. She was as such the first Communist elected to the post. She mainly devoted her effort to children's welfare.
