= Eva-Marie Håkansson =

Swedish swimmer

Medal record

Women's swimming

Representing Sweden

European Championships (LC)
Bronze medal – third place	1977 Jönköping	200 m breaststroke

Eva-Marie Gunilla Håkansson (born 7 October 1960 in Ljungby, Kronoberg) is a former Swedish Olympic swimmer. She competed in relay and breaststroke events in the 1980 Summer Olympics and in the 1984 Summer Olympics.

== Clubs ==
- Kristianstads SLS
