= Ann-Sofi Roos =

Swedish swimmer

Personal information
- Born: November 27, 1959 (age 66)

Sport
- Sport: Swimming
- Strokes: Breaststroke, medley

Ann-Sofi Roos (born 27 November 1959) is a former Swedish Olympic swimmer. She competed in the breaststroke and individual medley events in the 1976 Summer Olympics and in the 1980 Summer Olympics.

== Clubs ==
- Kristianstads SLS
