= Ellenor Svensson =

Swedish swimmer

Medal record

Women's swimming

Representing Sweden

European Championships (LC)
Silver medal – second place	1995 Vienna	4×100 m freestyle

Ellenor Susanne Svensson (born 3 February 1971 in Längbro, Örebro) is a former Swedish Olympic swimmer. She competed in the 1992 Summer Olympics, where she swam the 100 m freestyle and the 4×100 m freestyle relay. She finished 23rd in the individual event and 7th with the team.

== Clubs ==
- Norrköpings KK
