= Malin Strömberg =

Swedish swimmer

Personal information
- Born: 13 April 1976 (age 50) Staffanstorp, Skåne County, Sweden

Sport
- Sport: Swimming
- Strokes: Butterfly

Malin Maria Birgitta Strömberg (born 13 April 1976) is a former Swedish Olympic swimmer. She competed in the 1992 Summer Olympics, where she finished 24th in the 100 m butterfly.

== Clubs ==
- Ystads SS
