= Ingrid Gustavsson =

Swedish swimmer

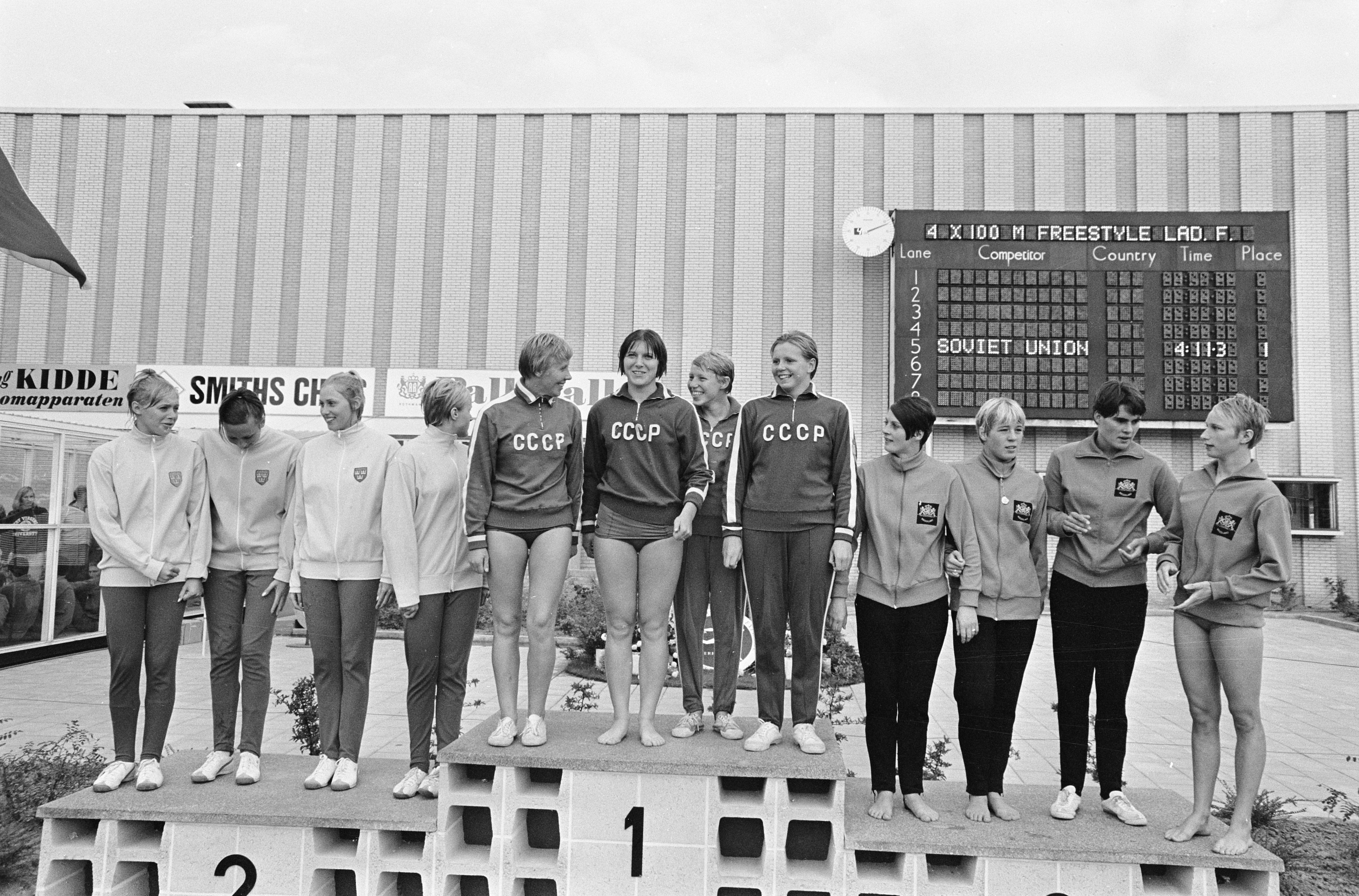
- 1966 European Aquatics Championships

Personal information
- Born: 10 March 1950 Luleå, Sweden
- Height: 1.69 m (5 ft 7 in)
- Weight: 58 kg (128 lb)

Sport
- Sport: Swimming
- Club: Luleå SS
Medal record
Women's swimming
Representing Sweden
European Championships
Silver medal – second place	1966 Utrecht	4×100 m freestyle

Ingrid Margareta Gustavsson (born 10 March 1950) is a Swedish swimmer who won a silver medal in the 4 × 100 m freestyle relay at the 1966 European Aquatics Championships. She also competed in the same event at the 1968 Summer Olympics, but the Swedish team was eliminated in the preliminaries.
