= Gunilla Lundberg =

Swedish swimmer (1957–2024)

Personal information
- Born: 6 February 1957 Umeå, Sweden
- Died: 24 March 2024 (aged 67) Eskilstuna, Sweden
- Height: 1.79 m (5 ft 10 in)
- Weight: 67 kg (148 lb)

Sport
- Sport: Swimming
- Club: Borlänge SS
Medal record
Women's swimming
Representing Sweden
European Championships
Bronze medal – third place	1974 Vienna	4×100 m medley

Ingrid Gunilla "Nilla" Lundberg Rasmuson (6 February 1957 – 24 March 2024) was a Swedish swimmer who won a bronze medal at the 1974 European Aquatics Championships. She competed in four freestyle and backstroke events at the 1976 Summer Olympics with the best achievement of seventh place in the 4 × 100 m freestyle relay. She died while attending the 2024 Swedish masters championship in Eskilstuna.
