= Sofia Kraft =

Swedish swimmer

Personal information
- Born: 23 December 1965 (age 60) Lidköping, Sweden

Sport
- Sport: Swimming

Sofia Kraft (born 23 December 1965) is a Swedish backstroke and individual medley swimmer. She competed in two events at the 1984 Summer Olympics.
