= Vera Kock =

Swedish swimmer

Personal information
- Born: 17 May 1952 (age 74) Heiligenhafen, Germany

Sport
- Sport: Swimming

Vera Kock (born 17 May 1952) is a Swedish former swimmer. She competed in the women's 100 metre freestyle at the 1968 Summer Olympics.
