= Eva Wikner =

Swedish swimmer

Personal information
- Full name: Eva Christina Wikner
- Born: 6 July 1955 (age 71) Stockholm, Sweden

Sport
- Sport: Swimming

Eva Christina Wikner (born 6 July 1955) is a Swedish former butterfly swimmer. She competed in three events at the 1972 Summer Olympics.

Wikner represented Stockholmspolisens IF.
