= Anette Fredriksson =

Swedish swimmer

Personal information
- Born: 3 June 1960 Karlstad, Sweden
- Died: 30 July 2008 (aged 48) Nyköping, Sweden

Sport
- Sport: Swimming

Anette Fredriksson (3 June 1960 – 30 July 2008) was a Swedish breaststroke swimmer. She competed in three events at the 1976 Summer Olympics.
