= Trelleborgs SS =

Swedish swimming club

Club information
- Full name: Trelleborgs Simsällskap
- Short name: TSS
- City: Trelleborg
- Founded: 1922

Trelleborgs Simsällskap, commonly known as Trelleborgs SS or TSS, is a defunct Swedish swimming club from Trelleborg, Skåne, founded in 1922. In the 2010s, Trelleborgs SS and Trelleborgs Kappsim merged to Trelleborg Sim.

== Swimmers ==
Swimmers that have participated in the Summer Olympics while representing Trelleborgs SS:

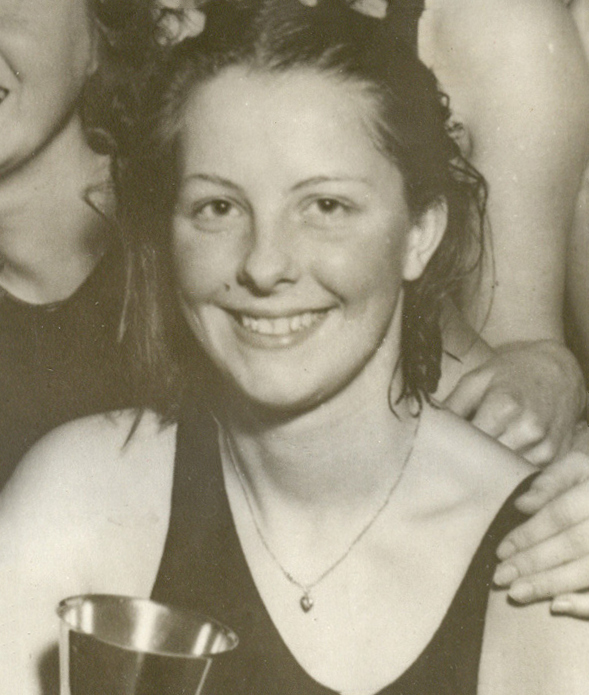
Trelleborgs SS swimmer Gisela Thidholm

- Camilla Johansson
- Ida Mattsson
- Mattias Ohlin
- Gisela Thidholm
