= Armi Airaksinen =

Swedish swimmer

Personal information
- Born: May 22, 1962 (age 64) Stockholm, Sweden

Sport
- Sport: Swimming
- Strokes: Butterfly

Armi Ursula Airaksinen-Båveryd (born 22 May 1962) is a former Swedish Olympic swimmer. She competed in the 1980 Summer Olympics, where she swam the 100 m butterfly and the 200 m butterfly.

== Clubs ==
- Stockholmspolisens IF
