= Stockholmspolisens IF =

Swedish sports club

Stockholmspolisens IF is a Swedish sports club from Stockholm, Sweden, founded on 9 August 1914. Stockholmspolisens IF has departments in handball, basketball, football, judo, triathlon, swimming, diving, masters swimming, and water polo. From the beginning, the club was only for policemen and their families, however from 1940s, the sports club has been opened to everyone.

== Swimming ==
Stockholmspolisens IF

Club information
- Full name: Stockholmspolisens Idrottsförening
- Nickname(s): Polisen (The Police)
- Short name: SPIF
- City: Stockholm
- Founded: 9 August 1912; 113 years ago (sports club); 16 June 2014; 11 years ago (swimming club refounded)
- Home pool: Eriksdalsbadet

The current swimming club was founded on 16 June 2014.

=== Swimmers ===
Swimmers that have participated in the Summer Olympics while representing Stockholmspolisens IF:

- Armi Airaksinen
- Håkan Bengtsson
- Mikael Brandén
- Anders Grillhammar
- Per Holmertz
- Annelie Holmström
- Tommie Lindström
- Jan Lundin
- Anders Norling
- Diana Olsson
- Britt-Marie Smedh
- Bo Westergren
- Eva Wikner

== Waterpolo ==
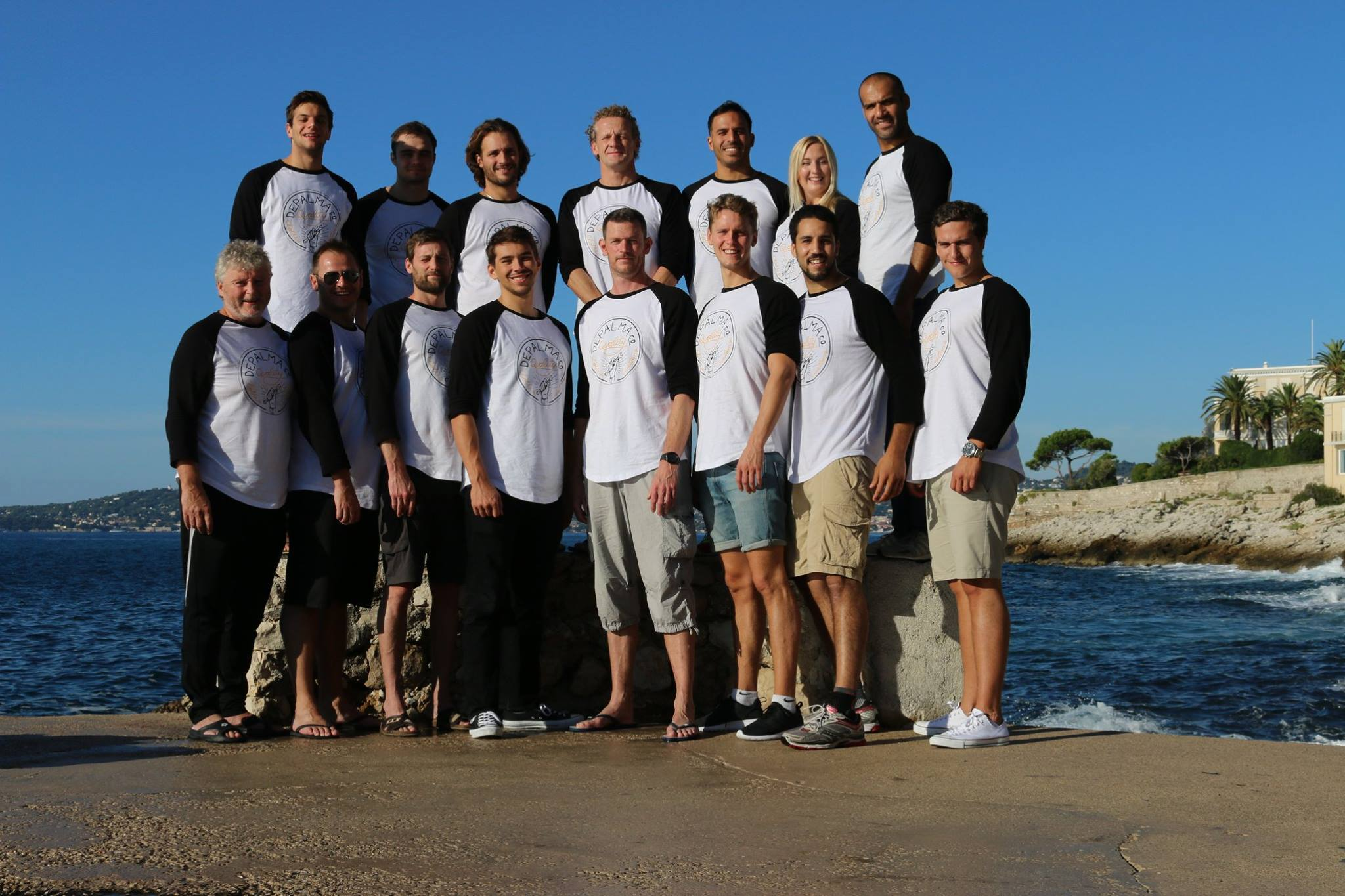
2015 team

The team roster for the 2015–16 season:

Staff:

- Head coach: (Sweden) Gunnar Johansson
- Manager: (Sweden) Hans Lundén

Goalkeepers:

- (Sweden) Olaani Hedeta
- (Iran) Mehdi Malek

Field players:

- (Sweden) Henrik Sjöberg (centre back)
- (Sweden) Richard Ericson (centre back)
- (Italy) Maxime Gazzo (centre back)
- (Sweden) Oskar Thiel (C) (all round)
- (Sweden) Mattias Renholm (driver)
- (Sweden) Andreas Hartzell (driver)
- (Italy) Pierdomenico Polito (driver)
- (United States) Mark Conrad (driver)
- (Australia) Michael Lawson (driver)
- (Venezuela) Vicente Tirado (centre forward)
- (Sweden) Johan Lundén (centre forward)
- (Sweden) Kim Hansson (lefthanded / centre forward)
- (Croatia) Vedran Preloznik (lefthanded)

=== Water polo players ===
Water polo players that have participated in the Summer Olympics while representing Stockholmspolisens IF:

- Anders Flodqvist
- Arne Jutner

== Handball ==
The Stockholmspolisens women's handball team won the Swedish Championship 12 times, including seven times in a row from 1979 to 1985. Their last title came in 1990.
