= Camilla Johansson (swimmer) =

Swedish swimmer (born 1974)

Personal information
- Born: January 9, 1974 (age 52)

Sport
- Sport: Swimming
- Strokes: Backstroke
- Club: Trelleborgs SS

Camilla Johansson (born January 9, 1974) is a former Swedish Olympic backstroke swimmer. She competed in the 2000 Summer Olympics, where she finished 10th in the 4×100 m medley relay team and 31st in the 100 m backstroke. Her married name is Camilla Johansson-Sponseller. She now swims for the Sun Devils Masters in Tempe, Arizona.

She lives in Tuscaloosa, AL with her husband, two children and a great dane named Hector.

== Clubs ==
- Trelleborgs SS
- Växjö SS
