= Göteborg Sim =

Swedish swimming team

Club information
- Full name: Föreningen Göteborg Sim
- Short name: GS
- City: Gothenburg
- Founded: 3 June 1991; 34 years ago
- Home pool: Valhallabadet

Föreningen Göteborg Sim, commonly known as Göteborg Sim, is a Swedish swimming club based in Gothenburg and founded in 1991. The greatest swimmers in the history of Göteborg Sim is Erik Andersson and Josefin Lillhage.

== History ==
Göteborg Sim was founded on 3 June 1991 through a merge of Göteborgs KK Najaden (founded through a merge of Göteborgs KK and SK Najaden in 1971, where Göteborgs KK was founded in 1934 as Masthuggets SIS, and SK Najaden in 1917 from the women's department of SK Göteborg) and Askim-Frölunda SK (founded 1972 as Askims SK).

At the 1999 FINA World Swimming Championships, Göteborg Sim swimmer Josefin Lillhage won a gold in the 4×200-metre freestyle relay with Sweden. Lillhage, who had swum for Göteborg Sim and its merging members her whole career except for two years at Simavdelningen 1902, continued to Väsby SS the following year.

Göteborg Sim had their first Olympic swimmer at the 2008 Summer Olympics, when Claire Hedenskog and Joline Höstman participated.

In 2022, the diving and synchronized swimming club SIK Delfin (founded in 1997 as SHK Göteborg) joined Göteborg Sim.

== Swimmers ==
Swimmers that have participated in the Summer Olympics while representing Göteborg Sim:

- Claire Hedenskog
- Joline Höstman
