= Kalmar SS =

Swedish swimming club

Club information
- Full name: Kalmar Simsällskap
- Short name: KSS
- City: Kalmar
- Founded: 1920; 106 years ago
- Home pool: Äventyrsbadet

Kalmar Simsällskap, commonly known as Kalmar SS, is a Swedish swimming club based in Kalmar and founded in 1920. The team's home pool is Äventyrsbadet.

== Divers ==
Divers that have participated in the Summer Olympics while representing Kalmar SS:

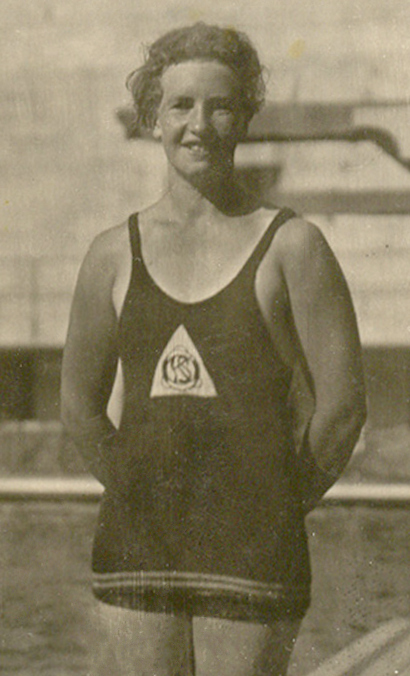
Kalmar SS diver Lala Sjöqvist

- Ingeborg Sjöqvist
- Lala Sjöqvist
