= Hanna Eriksson (swimmer, born 1984) =

Swedish swimmer

Personal information
- Born: 18 September 1984 (age 41) Södertälje, Sweden

Sport
- Sport: Swimming
- Club: Södertälje SS
Medal record
Representing Sweden
Women's swimming
World Championships - Short Course
Bronze medal – third place	2006 Shanghai	4 x 100 m freestyle relay
Silver medal – second place	2004 Indianapolis	4 x 100 m freestyle relay
European Championships (SC)
Silver medal – second place	2005 Trieste	100 m medley

Hanna Eriksson (born 18 September 1984) is a Swedish freestyle and medley swimmer.

Born in Södertälje, Eriksson represented Södertälje SS. She won a silver medal at the European SC Championships 2005 in Trieste, Italy after Finnish Hanna-Maria Seppälä.
