= Stina Gardell =

Swedish swimmer

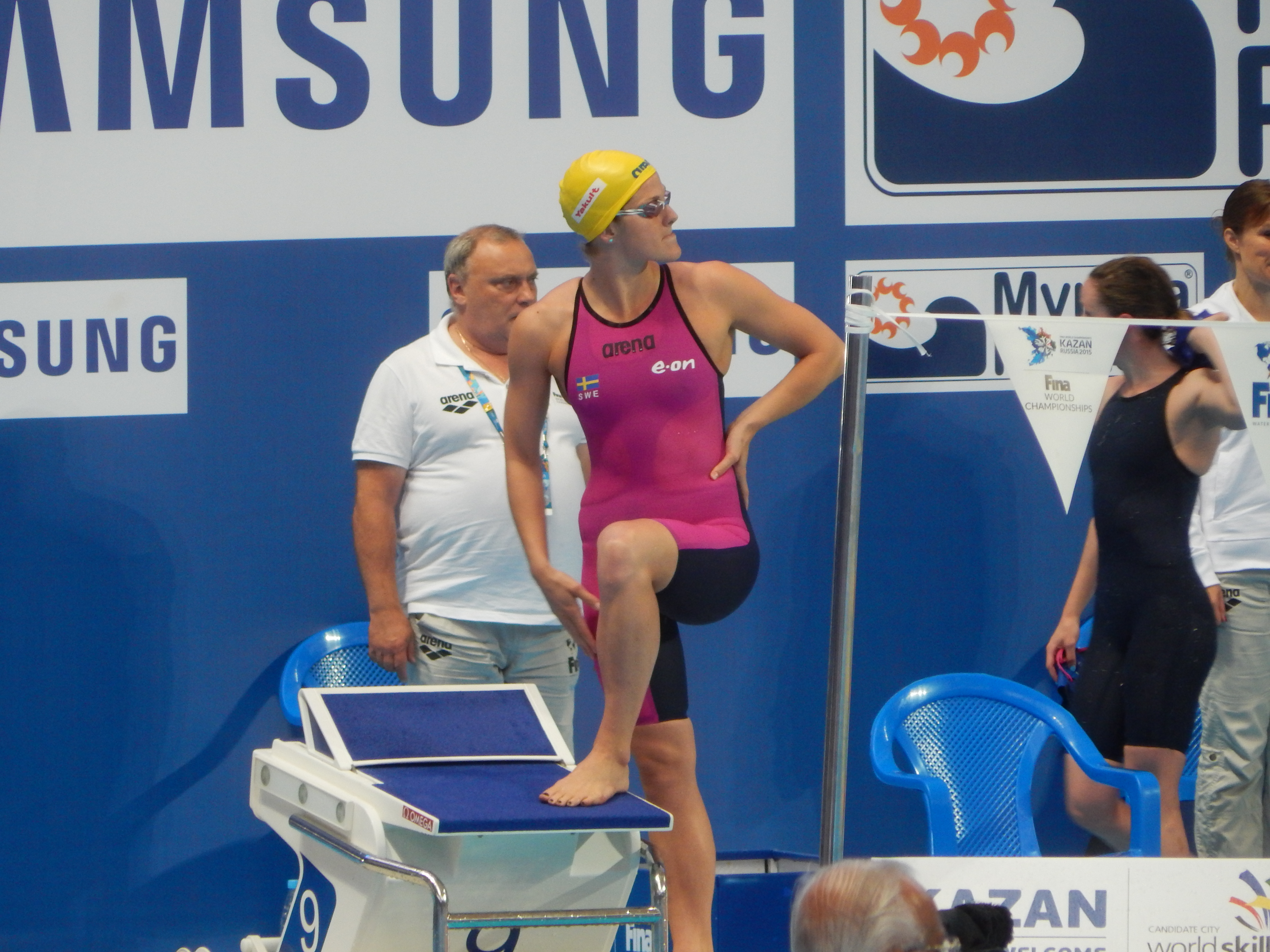
- In Kazan, 2015

Personal information
- Born: 28 March 1990 (age 36) Stockholm, Sweden
Medal record
Women's swimming
Representing Sweden
European Championships
Silver medal – second place	2014 Berlin	4x200 m freestyle

Stina Gardell (born 28 March 1990 in Stockholm) is a Swedish Olympic medley swimmer. She swam for Sweden at the 2012 and 2016 Olympics. She attends university, and swims from, the USA's University of Southern California.

At the 2012 Olympics she finished 14th in Women's 400 Individual Medley and 20th in the 200 m individual medley. At the 2016 Olympics she finished in 20th in the 200 m individual medley.
