= Ida Marko-Varga =

Swedish swimmer (born 1985)

Personal information
- Full name: Ida Marko-Varga
- Nationality: Sweden
- Born: 10 March 1985 (age 41) Helsingborg, Sweden

Sport
- Sport: Swimming
- Strokes: Freestyle, butterfly
- Club: SK Triton
Medal record
Representing Sweden
Women's swimming
World Championships (SC)
Bronze medal – third place	2004 Indianapolis	4×200 m freestyle
Bronze medal – third place	2006 Shanghai	4×100 m freestyle
European Championships (LC)
Silver medal – second place	2012 Debrecen	4×100 m freestyle
Bronze medal – third place	2002 Berlin	4×200 m freestyle
Bronze medal – third place	2008 Eindhoven	4×100 m freestyle
Bronze medal – third place	2016 London	4×100 m freestyle

Ida Marko-Varga (née Mattsson; born 10 March 1985) is a Swedish former swimmer. She represented SK Triton for most of her career. She represented Sweden in four Olympic games in a row (2004-2016).

== Career ==
Marko-Varga was born in Helsingborg, Sweden. Sge was an early prospect, winning two individual freestyle titles at the 1998 Swedish Swimming Championships at the age of 13. The winning marks were 2:03.95 on 200-metre freestyle and 4:21.41 on the 400 m freestyle. She won all the five titles she contested for in the Swedish Youth Championships the same summer, although she was one year younger than the others in her age group. At the Swedish Youth Short Course Championships she won six individual titles and two relay medals, still being one year younger.

She won a bronze medal in the 200-metre freestyle event at the 2000 European Junior Swimming Championships, behind Irina Oufimtseva and Éva Risztov.

At the Athens 2004 Olympic Games she swam in the 4 × 200 m freestyle relay (with Josefin Lillhage, Malin Svahnström and Lotta Wänberg), finishing 8th in the final.

At the 2008 Summer Olympics she competed in individually 200 m freestyle and in the 4 × 100 m freestyle and the 4 × 200 m freestyle. She finished 16th individually and 8th with 4×200 relay team. The 4 × 100 m freestyle team didn't make the finals finishing 11th in the prelims.

After the 2008 Olympics, she rejoined her mother club SK Triton.

Marko-Varga has been involved in two relay bronze medals at the Short Course World Championships, the 4 × 100 m freestyle relay in Shanghai 2006 and the 4 × 200 m freestyle relay at the 2004 Indianapolis championships. She has also earned two relay bronze medals at the European Championships, 4 × 200 m freestyle relay in Berlin 2002 and 4 × 100 m freestyle relay in Eindhoven 2008.

Marko-Varga quit swimming in 2012, but was then selected for to represent her country in the 2014 FINA World Swimming Championships (25 m) in Doha.

== Clubs ==
- SK Triton (, 2008–)
- Trelleborgs SS
- Malmö KK
- SK Ran (−2008)
