= Hanna Westrin =

Swedish swimmer

Personal information
- Full name: Hanna Westrin
- Nationality: Sweden
- Born: 25 November 1991 (age 34) Sundsvall, Sweden
- Height: 1.68 m (5 ft 6 in)
- Weight: 60 kg (132 lb)

Sport
- Sport: Swimming
- Strokes: Breaststroke
- Club: Sundsvalls SS
Medal record
Women's swimming
Representing Sweden
European Championships (SC)
Silver medal – second place	2007 Debrecen	4x50 Medley

Hanna Westrin (born 25 November 1991) is a breaststroke Swedish swimmer from Sundsvall.

== Clubs ==
- Sundsvalls SS
