= Claire Hedenskog =

Swedish swimmer

Medal record

Women's swimming

Representing Sweden

European Championships (LC)
Bronze medal – third place	2008 Eindhoven	4×100 m freestyle

Claire Hedenskog (born 10 March 1980) is a Swedish swimmer from Gothenburg, representing Göteborg Sim. Hedenskog participated in the 4 × 100 m freestyle relay prelims at the 2008 Summer Olympics, where the Swedish team finished 11th.

== Clubs ==
- Göteborg Sim
