= Väsby SS =

Swedish swimming club

Club information
- Full name: Väsby Simsällskap
- Short name: VSS
- City: Upplands Väsby
- Founded: 1964; 62 years ago
- Home pool: Vilundabadet

Väsby Simsällskap, commonly known as Väsby SS or VSS, is a swimming club from Upplands Väsby north of Stockholm, Sweden. It was founded in 1964 and the home pool is Vilundabadet. Väsby SS is one of the major Swedish swim teams finishing in the top by medals on the latest Swedish Swimming Championships.

== Swimmers ==
Swimmers that have participated in the Summer Olympics while representing Väsby SS:

- Daniel Carlsson
- Petra Granlund
- Josefin Lillhage
- Malin Svahnström
