= Josefin Lillhage =

Swedish swimmer (born 1980)

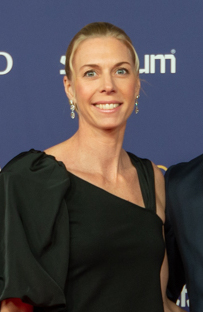

Personal information
- Full name: Anna Josefin Lillhage
- Nationality: Sweden
- Born: 15 March 1980 (age 46) Gothenburg, Sweden
- Height: 1.74 m (5 ft 9 in)

Sport
- Sport: Swimming
- Strokes: Freestyle
- Club: Väsby SS
Medal record
Women's swimming
Representing Sweden
Olympic Games
Bronze medal – third place	2000 Sydney	4×100 m freestyle
World Championships (LC)
Bronze medal – third place	2005 Montreal	200 m freestyle
World Championships (SC)
Gold medal – first place	1999 Hong Kong	4×200 m freestyle
Gold medal – first place	2002 Moscow	4×100 m freestyle
Gold medal – first place	2004 Indianapolis	200 m freestyle
Silver medal – second place	1997 Gothenburg	4×200 m freestyle
Silver medal – second place	2004 Indianapolis	100 m freestyle
Silver medal – second place	2004 Indianapolis	4×100 m freestyle
Bronze medal – third place	1999 Hong Kong	200 m freestyle
Bronze medal – third place	2004 Indianapolis	4×200 m freestyle
Bronze medal – third place	2004 Indianapolis	4×100 m medley
Bronze medal – third place	2006 Shanghai	4×100 m freestyle
European Championships (LC)
Silver medal – second place	1997 Seville	4×100 m freestyle
Silver medal – second place	1997 Seville	4×200 m freestyle
Silver medal – second place	1999 Istanbul	4×100 m freestyle
Silver medal – second place	1999 Istanbul	4×200 m freestyle
Silver medal – second place	2002 Berlin	4×100 m freestyle
Bronze medal – third place	2002 Berlin	4×200 m freestyle
Bronze medal – third place	2004 Madrid	200 m freestyle
Bronze medal – third place	2004 Madrid	4×100 m freestyle
Bronze medal – third place	2008 Eindhoven	4×100 m freestyle
Bronze medal – third place	2010 Budapest	4×100 m freestyle
European Championships (SC)
Gold medal – first place	2002 Riesa	4×50 m freestyle
Gold medal – first place	2003 Dublin	4×50 m medley
Gold medal – first place	2004 Vienna	200 m freestyle
Gold medal – first place	2005 Trieste	200 m freestyle
Gold medal – first place	2006 Helsinki	4×50 m freestyle
Gold medal – first place	2007 Debrecen	200 m freestyle
Silver medal – second place	1999 Lisbon	200 m freestyle
Silver medal – second place	2003 Dublin	200 m freestyle
Silver medal – second place	2003 Dublin	4×50 m freestyle
Silver medal – second place	2005 Trieste	4×50 m freestyle
Silver medal – second place	2006 Helsinki	4×50 m medley
Silver medal – second place	2007 Debrecen	4×50 m freestyle
Silver medal – second place	2009 Istanbul	4×50 m freestyle
Silver medal – second place	2009 Istanbul	4×50 m medley
Bronze medal – third place	2002 Riesa	200 m freestyle
Bronze medal – third place	2004 Vienna	100 m freestyle
Bronze medal – third place	2004 Vienna	4×50 m freestyle
Bronze medal – third place	2004 Vienna	4×50 m medley
Bronze medal – third place	2005 Trieste	4×50 m medley
Bronze medal – third place	2006 Helsinki	100 m freestyle
Bronze medal – third place	2006 Helsinki	200 m freestyle
Bronze medal – third place	2007 Debrecen	100 m freestyle
Bronze medal – third place	2007 Debrecen	4×50 m medley

Josefin Lillhage (born 15 March 1980) is a former swimmer from Sweden, who won the bronze medal in the 200 m freestyle at the 2005 World Aquatics Championships in Montreal, Quebec, Canada. She competed in four Olympiads: in 1996, 2000, 2004 and 2008.

== Personal bests ==
=== Long course (50 m) ===
Event	Time		Date	Meet	Location	Ref
100 m freestyle	54.07	NR (h)	13 Aug 2008	Olympic Games	Beijing, China	
200 m freestyle	1:57.78	NR	27 Mar 2007	World Championships	Melbourne, Australia	

Legend: WR – World record; ER – European record; NR – Swedish record;
Records not set in finals: h – heat; sf – semifinal; r – relay 1st leg; rh – relay heat 1st leg; b – B final; † – en route to final mark; so – swim-off; tt – time trial

=== Short course (25 m) ===
Event	Time		Date	Meet	Location	Ref
50 m freestyle	24.28	(sf)	13 Dec 2009	European SC Championships	Istanbul, Turkey	
100 m freestyle	52.45	(sf)	10 Dec 2009	European SC Championships	Istanbul, Turkey	
200 m freestyle	1:53.55	NR	16 Dec 2007	European SC Championships	Debrecen, Hungary	
400 m freestyle	4:05.40		11 Mar 2004	Swedish SC Championships	Malmö, Sweden	
100 m individual medley	59.84		29 Nov 2008	Swedish SC Championships	Stockholm, Sweden	

Legend: WR – World record; ER – European record; NR – Swedish record;
Records not set in finals: h – heat; sf – semifinal; r – relay 1st leg; rh – relay heat 1st leg; b – B final; † – en route to final mark; so – swim-off; tt – time trial

== Clubs ==
- Simavdelningen 1902
- Göteborg Sim (-1999)
- Väsby SS (1999-)
