= List of Swedish Swimming Championships champions (women) =

This is a list of women's champions of the Swedish Swimming Championships, the annual swimming championship in long course, usually held outdoors in the Swedish summer. Records of women's events go back to 1910 in freestyle, backstroke, breaststroke, butterfly, and various relays and medley competitions.

== Current program ==
=== 50 metre freestyle ===
- 1983 – Agneta Eriksson (Västerås SS)
- 1984 – Stina Persson (Kristianstads SLS)
- 1985 – Agneta Eriksson (Västerås SS)
- 1986 – Agneta Eriksson (Västerås SS)
- 1987 – Stina Persson (Helsingborgs S)
- 1988 – Karin Furuhed (Borlänge SS)
- 1989 – Helena Åberg (Helsingborgs S)
- 1990 – Helena Åberg (Helsingborgs S)
- 1991 – Ellenor Svensson (Linköpings ASS)
- 1992 – Linda Olofsson (Sundsvalls SS)
- 1993 – Linda Olofsson (Sundsvalls SS)
- 1994 – Linda Olofsson (Sundsvalls SS)
- 1995 – Linda Olofsson (Södertälje SS)
- 1996 – Linda Olofsson (Södertälje SS)
- 1997 – Therese Alshammar (SK Neptun)
- 1998 – Therese Alshammar (SK Neptun)
- 1999 – Therese Alshammar (SK Neptun)
- 2000 – Therese Alshammar (SK Neptun)
- 2001 – Johanna Sjöberg (Södertälje SS)
- 2002 – Therese Alshammar (SK Neptun)
- 2003 – Therese Alshammar (SK Neptun)
- 2004 – Anna-Karin Kammerling (Sundsvalls SS)
- 2005 – Therese Alshammar (SK Neptun)
- 2006 – Therese Alshammar (SK Neptun)
- 2007 – Therese Alshammar (SK Neptun)
- 2008 – Therese Alshammar (SK Neptun)
- 2009 – Therese Alshammar (Täby Sim)
- 2010 – Therese Alshammar (Täby Sim)
- 2011 – Therese Alshammar (Täby Sim)
- 2012 – Therese Alshammar (Täby Sim)
- 2013 – Sarah Sjöström (Södertörns SS)
- 2014 – Sarah Sjöström (Södertörns SS)
- 2015 – Sarah Sjöström (Södertörns SS)
- 2016 – Sarah Sjöström (Södertörns SS)
- 2017 – Sarah Sjöström (Södertörns SS)
- 2018 – Sarah Sjöström (Södertörns SS)
- 2019 – Sarah Sjöström (Södertörns SS)
- 2021 – Sofia Åstedt (SK Elfsborg)
- 2022 – Sofia Åstedt (SK Elfsborg)

=== 100 metre freestyle ===
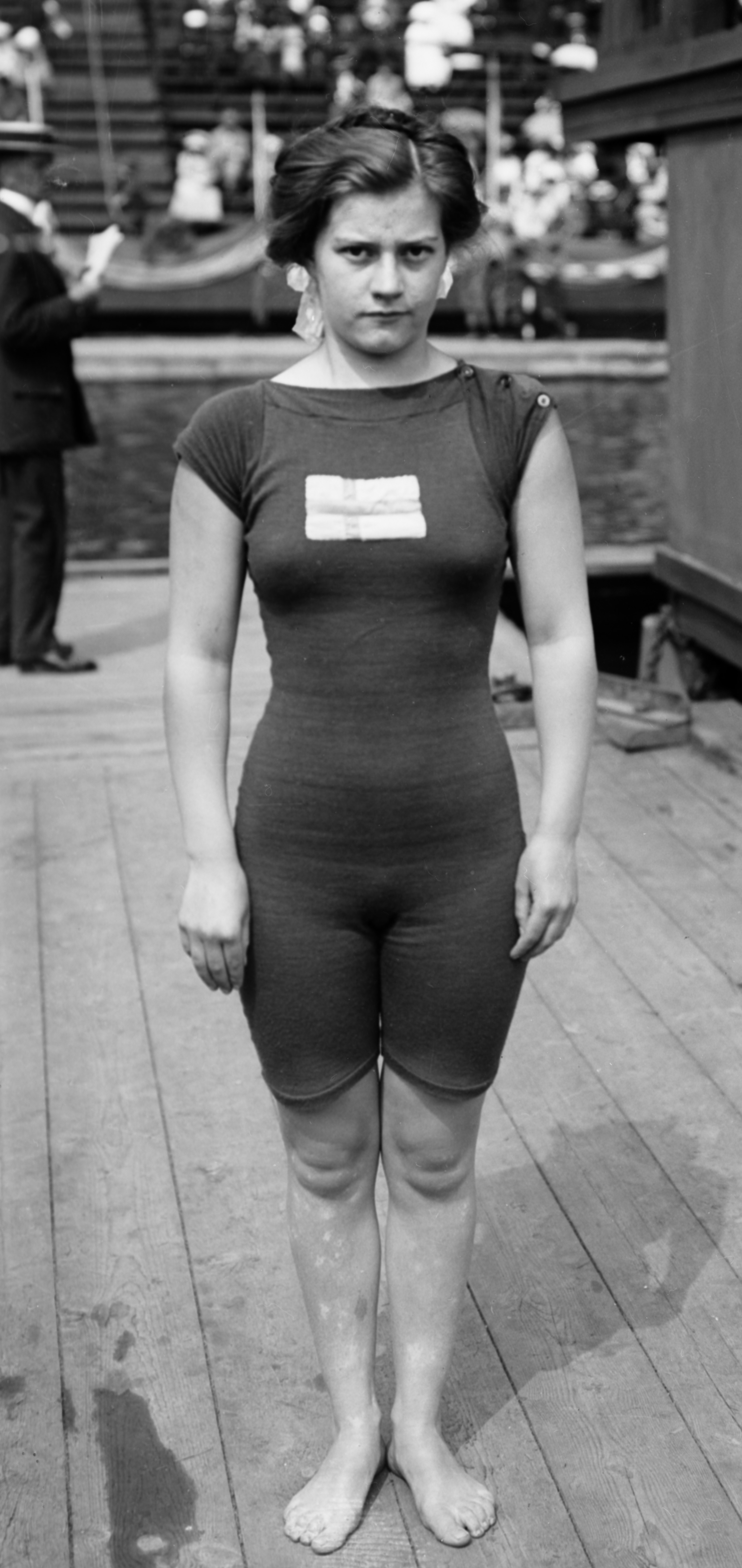
Stockholms KK swimmer Greta Johansson won the inaugural title in the 100 metre freestyle event in 1910, the first women's title at the Swedish Swimming Championships

- 1910 – Greta Johansson (Stockholms KK)
- 1911 – Greta Johansson (Stockholms KK)
- 1912 – Greta Karlsson (Eskilstuna SS)
- 1913 – Emy Machnow (Malmö S)
- 1914 – Vera Thulin (Stockholms KK)
- 1915 – Emy Machnow (Malmö S)
- 1916 – Emy Machnow (Malmö S)
- 1917 – Emy Machnow (Malmö S)
- 1918 – Jane Gylling (SK Najaden)
- 1919 – Jane Gylling (SK Najaden)
- 1920 – Carin Nilsson (Stockholms KK)
- 1921 – Aina Berg (SK Najaden)
- 1922 – Aina Berg (SK Najaden)
- 1923 – Hjördis Töpel (SK Najaden)
- 1924 – Hjördis Töpel (SK Najaden)
- 1925 – Aina Berg (SK Najaden)
- 1926 – Aina Berg (SK Najaden)
- 1927 – Gurli Ewerlund (Malmö S)
- 1928 – Gurli Ewerlund (Malmö S)
- 1929 – May Eliasson (IFK Stockholm)
- 1930 – Hjördis Töpel (SK Najaden)
- 1931 – May Eliasson (IFK Stockholm)
- 1932 – May Eliasson (IFK Stockholm)
- 1933 – Ingrid Stenmarck (Malmö S)
- 1934 – Ingrid Stenmarck (Malmö S)
- 1935 – Ingrid Stenmarck (Malmö S)
- 1936 – Ingrid Stenmarck (Malmö S)
- 1937 – Ingrid Stenmarck (Malmö S)
- 1938 – Ann-Marie Herlin (Stockholms KK)
- 1939 – Gunnel Söderberg (IFK Stockholm)
- 1940 – Gunnel Söderberg (IFK Stockholm)
- 1941 – Gunnel Söderberg (IFK Stockholm)
- 1942 – Gunnel Söderberg (IFK Stockholm)
- 1943 – Ingrid Thafvelin (Eskilstuna SS)
- 1944 – Gunvor Nilsson (Hälsingborgs S)
- 1945 – Ingegärd Fredin (Ängby SS)
- 1946 – Ingegärd Fredin (Ängby SS)
- 1947 – Ingegärd Fredin (Ängby SS)
- 1948 – Ingegärd Fredin (Ängby SS)
- 1949 – Ingegärd Fredin (Ängby SS)
- 1950 – Marianne Lundquist (Karlskoga SS)
- 1951 – Marianne Lundquist (Karlskoga SS)
- 1952 – Marianne Lundquist (SK Neptun)
- 1953 – Marianne Lundquist (SK Neptun)
- 1954 – Marianne Lundquist (SK Neptun)
- 1955 – Anita Hellström (SK Neptun)
- 1956 – Kate Jobson (Varbergs GIF)
- 1957 – Kate Jobson (Varbergs GIF)
- 1958 – Kate Jobson (Varbergs GIF)
- 1959 – Kate Jobson (Varbergs GIF)
- 1960 – Karin Larsson (SK Ran)
- 1961 – Karin Grubb (SK Poseidon)
- 1962 – Ann-Christine Hagberg (SK Neptun)
- 1963 – Ann-Christine Hagberg (SK Neptun)
- 1964 – Ann-Charlott Lilja (SK Najaden)
- 1965 – Ann-Christine Hagberg (SK Neptun)
- 1966 – Ann-Christine Hagberg (SK Neptun)
- 1967 – Elisabeth Berglund (Timrå AIF)
- 1968 – Lotten Andersson (Linköpings ASS)
- 1969 – Vera Kock (Timrå AIF)
- 1970 – Elisabeth Berglund (Sundsvalls SS)
- 1971 – Anita Zarnowiecki (Simavdelningen 1902)
- 1972 – Anita Zarnowiecki (Simavdelningen 1902)
- 1973 – Diana Olsson (Stockholmspolisens IF)
- 1974 – Diana Olsson (Stockholmspolisens IF)
- 1975 – Ylva Persson (Borlänge SS)
- 1976 – Ylva Persson (Borlänge SS)
- 1977 – Birgitta Jönsson (Avesta SS)
- 1978 – Birgitta Jönsson (Avesta SS)
- 1979 – Agneta Eriksson (Västerås SS)
- 1980 – Carina Ljungdahl (Filipstads SS)
- 1981 – Agneta Eriksson (Västerås SS)
- 1982 – Agneta Eriksson (Västerås SS)
- 1983 – Agneta Eriksson (Västerås SS)
- 1984 – Maria Kardum (Kristianstads SLS)
- 1985 – Karin Furuhed (Borlänge SS)
- 1986 – Eva Nyberg (Mariestads SS)
- 1987 – Karin Furuhed (Borlänge SS)
- 1988 – Eva Nyberg (Mariestads SS)
- 1989 – Eva Nyberg (Mariestads SS)
- 1990 – Malin Gustavsson (Kristianstads SLS)
- 1991 – Eva Nyberg (Mariestads SS)
- 1992 – Ellenor Svensson (Norrköpings KK)
- 1993 – Louise Jöhncke (Spårvägens SF)
- 1994 – Louise Jöhncke (Spårvägens SF)
- 1995 – Ellenor Svensson (Norrköpings KK)
- 1996 – Linda Olofsson (Södertälje SS)
- 1997 – Therese Alshammar (SK Neptun)
- 1998 – Therese Alshammar (SK Neptun)
- 1999 – Louise Jöhncke (Spårvägens SF)
- 2000 – Malin Svahnström (Väsby SS)
- 2001 – Johanna Sjöberg (Södertälje SS)
- 2002 – Therese Alshammar (SK Neptun)
- 2003 – Johanna Sjöberg (Spårvägens SF)
- 2004 – Johanna Sjöberg (Spårvägens SF)
- 2005 – Josefin Lillhage (Väsby SS)
- 2006 – Johanna Sjöberg (Spårvägens SF)
- 2007 – Josefin Lillhage (Väsby SS)
- 2008 – Josefin Lillhage (Väsby SS)
- 2009 – Josefin Lillhage (Väsby SS)
- 2010 – Josefin Lillhage (Väsby SS)
- 2011 – Sarah Sjöström (Södertörns SS)
- 2012 – Michelle Coleman (Täby Sim)
- 2013 – Sarah Sjöström (Södertörns SS)
- 2014 – Sarah Sjöström (Södertörns SS)
- 2015 – Sarah Sjöström (Södertörns SS)
- 2016 – Michelle Coleman (Spårvägens SF)
- 2017 – Louise Hansson (Helsingborgs S)
- 2018 – Louise Hansson (Helsingborgs S)
- 2019 – Sophie Hansson (Helsingborgs S)
- 2021 – Hanna Eriksson (Jönköpings SS)
- 2022 – Sofia Åstedt (SK Elfsborg)

=== 200 metre freestyle ===
- 1969 – Gunilla Wikman (Stockholmspolisens IF)
- 1970 – Anita Zarnowiecki (Simavdelningen 1902)
- 1971 – Irwi Johansson (SK Najaden)
- 1972 – Irwi Johansson (SK Najaden)
- 1973 – Irwi Johansson (SK Najaden)
- 1974 – Gunilla Lundberg (Umeå SS)
- 1975 – Eva Andersson (SK Najaden)
- 1976 – Pia Mårtensson (Varbergs GIF)
- 1977 – Birgitta Jönsson (Avesta SS)
- 1978 – Birgitta Jönsson (Avesta SS)
- 1979 – Monica Parsmark (Upsala S)
- 1980 – Tina Gustafsson (Norrköpings KK)
- 1981 – Tina Gustafsson (Norrköpings KK)
- 1982 – Agneta Eriksson (Västerås SS)
- 1983 – Suzanne Nilsson (Filipstads SS)
- 1984 – Ann Linder (SK Najaden)
- 1985 – Agneta Eriksson (Västerås SS)
- 1986 – Eva Nyberg (Mariestads SS)
- 1987 – Agneta Eriksson (Västerås SS)
- 1988 – Suzanne Nilsson (Filipstads SS)
- 1989 – Eva Nyberg (Mariestads SS)
- 1990 – Malin Gustavsson (Kristianstads SLS)
- 1991 – Eva Nyberg (Mariestads SS)
- 1992 – Malin Nilsson (Malmö KK)
- 1993 – Malin Nilsson (Malmö KK)
- 1994 – Malin Nilsson (Malmö KK)
- 1995 – Louise Jöhncke (Spårvägens SF)
- 1996 – Louise Jöhncke (Spårvägens SF)
- 1997 – Johanna Sjöberg (Helsingborgs S)
- 1998 – Ida Mattsson (SK Triton)
- 1999 – Ida Mattsson (SK Triton)
- 2000 – Jenny Redlund (Malmö KK)
- 2001 – Josefin Lillhage (Väsby SS)
- 2002 – Josefin Lillhage (Väsby SS)
- 2003 – Josefin Lillhage (Väsby SS)
- 2004 – Josefin Lillhage (Väsby SS)
- 2005 – Josefin Lillhage (Väsby SS)
- 2006 – Josefin Lillhage (Väsby SS)
- 2007 – Josefin Lillhage (Väsby SS)
- 2008 – Josefin Lillhage (Väsby SS)
- 2009 – Sarah Sjöström (Södertörns SS)
- 2010 – Sarah Sjöström (Södertörns SS)
- 2011 – Sarah Sjöström (Södertörns SS)
- 2012 – Rebecka Palm (Linköpings ASS)
- 2013 – Sarah Sjöström (Södertörns SS)
- 2014 – Sarah Sjöström (Södertörns SS)
- 2015 – Sarah Sjöström (Södertörns SS)
- 2016 – Sarah Sjöström (Södertörns SS)
- 2017 – Sarah Sjöström (Södertörns SS)
- 2018 – Louise Hansson (Helsingborgs S)
- 2019 – Sarah Sjöström (Södertörns SS)
- 2021 – Hanna Eriksson (Jönköpings SS)
- 2022 – Hanna Eriksson (Jönköpings SS)

=== 400 metre freestyle ===
- 1933 – Ingrid Bredelius (SK Najaden)
- 1934 – Ingrid Bredelius (SK Najaden)
- 1935 – Margot Lundberg (Jönköpings SLS)
- 1936 – Sally Bauer (Stockholms KK)
- 1937 – Vivi Strandberg (Alingsås SS)
- 1938 – Maili Andersson (IFK Stockholm)
- 1939 – Gunnel Söderberg (IFK Stockholm)
- 1940 – Ingrid Thafvelin (Eskilstuna SS)
- 1941 – Ingrid Thafvelin (Eskilstuna SS)
- 1942 – Ingrid Thafvelin (Eskilstuna SS)
- 1943 – Ingrid Thafvelin (Eskilstuna SS)
- 1944 – Ingrid Thafvelin (Eskilstuna SS)
- 1945 – Ellen Larsson (Harnäs SS)
- 1946 – Ellen Larsson (Harnäs SS)
- 1947 – Gisela Thidholm (Trelleborgs SS)
- 1948 – Gisela Thidholm (Trelleborgs SS)
- 1949 – Gisela Thidholm (Trelleborgs SS)
- 1950 – Gisela Thidholm (Trelleborgs SS)
- 1951 – Marianne Lundquist (Karlskoga SS)
- 1952 – Ingegärd Fredin (SK Neptun)
- 1953 – Marianne Lundquist (SK Neptun)
- 1954 – Anita Hellström (SK Neptun)
- 1955 – Anita Hellström (SK Neptun)
- 1956 – Karin Larsson (SK Ran)
- 1957 – Karin Larsson (SK Ran)
- 1958 – Karin Larsson (SK Ran)
- 1959 – Bibbi Segerström (SK Neptun)
- 1960 – Jane Cederqvist (SK Neptun)
- 1961 – Jane Cederqvist (SK Neptun)
- 1962 – Elisabeth Ljunggren (SK Neptun)
- 1963 – Elisabeth Ljunggren (SK Neptun)
- 1964 – Elisabeth Ljunggren (SK Neptun)
- 1965 – Ann-Charlott Lilja (SK Najaden)
- 1966 – Ann-Charlott Lilja (SK Najaden)
- 1967 – Elisabeth Ljunggren (SK Neptun)
- 1968 – Elisabeth Berglund (Timrå AIF)
- 1969 – Gunilla Jonsson (Malmö S)
- 1970 – Gunilla Jonsson (Malmö S)
- 1971 – Gunilla Jonsson (Malmö S)
- 1972 – Irwi Johansson (SK Najaden)
- 1973 – Irwi Johansson (SK Najaden)
- 1974 – Marie Sundeborn (Värnamo SS)
- 1975 – Pia Mårtensson (Varbergs GIF)
- 1976 – Ingrid Nilsson (Helsingborgs S)
- 1977 – Susanne Ackum (Borlänge SS)
- 1978 – Susanne Ackum (Borlänge SS)
- 1979 – Monica Parsmark (Upsala S)
- 1980 – Monica Parsmark (Upsala S)
- 1981 – Ann Linder (SK Najaden)
- 1982 – Suzanne Nilsson (Filipstads SS)
- 1983 – Suzanne Nilsson (Filipstads SS)
- 1984 – Ann Linder (SK Najaden)
- 1985 – Christina Erlén (Växjö SS)
- 1986 – Anette Möller (Varbergs Sim)
- 1987 – Eva Nyberg (Mariestads SS)
- 1988 – Linda Rönnbäck (Luleå SS)
- 1989 – Eva Nyberg (Mariestads SS)
- 1990 – Malin Gustavsson (Kristianstads SLS)
- 1991 – Eva Nyberg (Mariestads SS)
- 1992 – Malin Nilsson (Malmö KK)
- 1993 – Malin Nilsson (Malmö KK)
- 1994 – Malin Nilsson (Malmö KK)
- 1995 – Malin Nilsson (Simavdelningen 1902)
- 1996 – Malin Nilsson (Simavdelningen 1902)
- 1997 – Åsa Sandlund (Linköpings ASS)
- 1998 – Ida Mattsson (SK Triton)
- 1999 – Lotta Wänberg (Malmö KK)
- 2000 – Åsa Sandlund (Linköpings ASS)
- 2001 – Ann Berglund (Jönköpings SS)
- 2002 – Ida Mattsson (Trelleborgs SS)
- 2003 – Josefin Lillhage (Väsby SS)
- 2004 – Josefin Lillhage (Väsby SS)
- 2005 – Josefin Lillhage (Väsby SS)
- 2006 – Josefin Lillhage (Väsby SS)
- 2007 – Gabriella Fagundez (SK Ran)
- 2008 – Gabriella Fagundez (SK Ran)
- 2009 – Gabriella Fagundez (SK Ran)
- 2010 – Sarah Henry (Stockholmspolisens IF)
- 2011 – Gabriella Fagundez (Väsby SS)
- 2012 – Ida Marko-Varga (SK Triton)
- 2013 – Louise Hansson (Helsingborgs S)
- 2014 – Louise Hansson (Helsingborgs S)
- 2015 – Henriette Stenkvist (SK Neptun)
- 2016 – Michelle Coleman (Spårvägens SF)
- 2017 – Hanna Eriksson (Jönköpings SS)
- 2018 – Hanna Eriksson (Jönköpings SS)
- 2019 – Emma Sundstedt (Spårvägens SF)
- 2021 – Hanna Eriksson (Jönköpings SS)
- 2022 – Lucie Hanquet (Göteborg Sim)

=== 800 metre freestyle ===
- 1969 – Vera Kock (Timrå AIF)
- 1970 – Gunilla Jonsson (Malmö S)
- 1971 – Gunilla Jonsson (Malmö S)
- 1972 – Else Gunsten (Kristianstads SLS)
- 1973 – Else Gunsten (Kristianstads SLS)
- 1974 – Else Gunsten (Kristianstads SLS)
- 1975 – Pia Ottosson (Mariestads SS)
- 1976 – Ingrid Nilsson (Helsingborgs S)
- 1977 – Kicki Pettersson (Linköpings ASS)
- 1978 – Susanne Ackum (Borlänge SS)
- 1979 – Susanne Ackum (Borlänge SS)
- 1980 – Annika Lindholm (Linköpings ASS)
- 1981 – Ann Linder (SK Najaden)
- 1982 – Ann Linder (SK Najaden)
- 1983 – Ulrika Sandmark (Spårvägens GoIF)
- 1984 – Ann Linder (SK Najaden)
- 1985 – Christina Erlén (Växjö SS)
- 1986 – Anette Möller (Varbergs Sim)
- 1987 – Christina Erlén (Växjö SS)
- 1988 – Linda Rönnbäck (Luleå SS)
- 1989 – Åsa Blom (Motala SS)
- 1990 – Malin Nilsson (Malmö KK)
- 1991 – Andrea Bolin (Växjö SS)
- 1992 – Malin Nilsson (Malmö KK)
- 1993 – Malin Nilsson (Malmö KK)
- 1994 – Malin Nilsson (Malmö KK)
- 1995 – Malin Nilsson (Simavdelningen 1902)
- 1996 – Malin Nilsson (Simavdelningen 1902)
- 1997 – Åsa Sandlund (Linköpings ASS)
- 1998 – Camilla Helgesson (Malmö KK)
- 1999 – Åsa Sandlund (Linköpings ASS)
- 2000 – Åsa Sandlund (Linköpings ASS)
- 2001 – Åsa Sandlund (Linköpings ASS)
- 2002 – Åsa Sandlund (Linköpings ASS)
- 2003 – Åsa Sandlund (Linköpings ASS)
- 2004 – Teresia Gimholt (S 77 Stenungsund)
- 2005 – Teresia Gimholt (S 77 Stenungsund)
- 2006 – Eva Berglund (Jönköpings SS)
- 2007 – Gabriella Fagundez (SK Ran)
- 2008 – Gabriella Fagundez (SK Ran)
- 2009 – Eva Berglund (Jönköpings SS)
- 2010 – Sarah Henry (Stockholmspolisens IF)
- 2011 – Gabriella Fagundez (Väsby SS)
- 2012 – Martina Granström (Jönköpings SS)
- 2013 – Martina Granström (Jönköpings SS)
- 2014 – Laura Lajunen (SK Neptun)
- 2015 – Alba Forés (SK Triton)
- 2016 – Erica Dahlgren (SK S 02)
- 2017 – Hanna Eriksson (Jönköpings SS)
- 2018 – Hanna Eriksson (Jönköpings SS)
- 2019 – Emma Sundstedt (Spårvägens SF)
- 2021 – Lucie Hanquet (Göteborg Sim)
- 2022 – Lucie Hanquet (Göteborg Sim)

=== 1500 metre freestyle ===
- 1983 – Ulrika Sandmark (Spårvägens GoIF)
- 1984 – Ann Linder (SK Najaden)
- 1985 – Ulrika Sandmark (Spårvägens GoIF)
- 2001 – Åsa Sandlund (Linköpings ASS)
- 2002 – Åsa Sandlund (Linköpings ASS)
- 2003 – Åsa Sandlund (Linköpings ASS)
- 2004 – Teresia Gimholt (S 77 Stenungsund)
- 2005 – Teresia Gimholt (S 77 Stenungsund)
- 2006 – Eva Berglund (Jönköpings SS)
- 2007 – Gabriella Fagundez (SK Ran)
- 2008 – Gabriella Fagundez (SK Ran)
- 2009 – Eva Berglund (Jönköpings SS)
- 2010 – Martina Granström (Jönköpings SS)
- 2011 – Gabriella Fagundez (Väsby SS)
- 2012 – Gabriella Fagundez (Väsby SS)
- 2013 – Martina Granström (Jönköpings SS)
- 2014 – Laura Lajunen (SK Neptun)
- 2015 – Erica Dahlgren (SK S 02)
- 2016 – Christine Ekman (SK Neptun)
- 2017 – Emma Sundstedt (Spårvägens SF)
- 2018 – Hanna Eriksson (Jönköpings SS)
- 2019 – Emma Sundstedt (Spårvägens SF)
- 2021 – Lucie Hanquet (Göteborg Sim)
- 2022 – Lucie Hanquet (Göteborg Sim)

=== 50 metre backstroke ===
- 1994 – Therese Alshammar (SK Neptun)
- 1995 – Therese Alshammar (SK Neptun)
- 1996 – Therese Alshammar (SK Neptun)
- 1998 – Therese Alshammar (SK Neptun)
- 1999 – Therese Alshammar (SK Neptun)
- 2000 – Therese Alshammar (SK Neptun)
- 2001 – Camilla Johansson (Trelleborgs SS)
- 2002 – Therese Alshammar (SK Neptun)
- 2003 – Susannah Moonan (Södertörns SS)
- 2004 – Susannah Moonan (Södertörns SS)
- 2005 – Therese Alshammar (SK Neptun)
- 2006 – Therese Alshammar (SK Neptun)
- 2007 – Elin Harnebrandt (Göteborg Sim)
- 2008 – Magdalena Kuras (Malmö KK)
- 2009 – Emma Svensson (Upsala S)
- 2010 – Magdalena Kuras (Malmö KK)
- 2011 – Therese Svendsen (SK Ran)
- 2012 – Michelle Coleman (Täby Sim)
- 2013 – Magdalena Kuras (SK Triton)
- 2014 – Ida Lindborg (Malmö KK)
- 2015 – Sarah Sjöström (Södertörns SS)
- 2016 – Ida Lindborg (Malmö KK)
- 2017 – Sarah Sjöström (Södertörns SS)
- 2018 – Ida Lindborg (Malmö KK)
- 2019 – Sarah Sjöström (Södertörns SS)
- 2021 – Alma Thormalm (Jönköpings SS)
- 2022 – Sara Junevik (Falu SS)

=== 100 metre backstroke ===
- 1928 – Gurli Ewerlund (Malmö S)
- 1929 – Astrid Carlsson (Nässjö SLS)
- 1930 – Astrid Carlsson (Nässjö SLS)
- 1931 – Ingrid Dott (Norrköpings KK)
- 1932 – Astrid Carlsson (Nässjö SLS)
- 1933 – Kerstin Isberg (IFK Stockholm)
- 1934 – Astrid Carlsson (Nässjö SLS)
- 1935 – Margot Lundberg (Jönköpings SLS)
- 1936 – Margot Lundberg (Jönköpings SLS)
- 1937 – Hjalmi Bornström (Västerås SS)
- 1938 – Ann-Marie Herlin (Stockholms KK)
- 1939 – Kerstin Nilsson (SK Najaden)
- 1940 – Elisabeth Boman (Linköpings ASS)
- 1941 – Ingrid Thafvelin (Eskilstuna SS)
- 1942 – Kerstin Åkerberg (IFK Stockholm)
- 1943 – Kjerstin Sörenson (Malmö S)
- 1944 – Kerstin Åkerberg (IFK Stockholm)
- 1945 – Kerstin Åkerberg (IFK Stockholm)
- 1946 – Anne-May Asp (Trelleborgs SS)
- 1947 – Ingegärd Fredin (IFK Stockholm)
- 1948 – Ingegärd Fredin (IFK Stockholm)
- 1949 – Ingegärd Fredin (IFK Stockholm)
- 1950 – Ingegärd Fredin (IFK Stockholm)
- 1951 – Marianne Lundquist (Karlskoga SS)
- 1952 – Ingegärd Fredin (IFK Stockholm)
- 1953 – Margareta Westesson (SK Poseidon)
- 1954 – Birgitta Ljunggren (Norrköpings KK)
- 1955 – Margareta Westesson (SK Poseidon)
- 1956 – Margareta Westesson (SK Poseidon)
- 1957 – Gull-Britt Jönsson (SK Poseidon)
- 1958 – Bibbi Segerström (SK Neptun)
- 1959 – Bibbi Segerström (SK Neptun)
- 1960 – Bibbi Segerström (SK Neptun)
- 1961 – Bibbi Segerström (SK Neptun)
- 1962 – Marianne Stridh (Malmö S)
- 1963 – Birgitta Haagman (Upsala S)
- 1964 – Birgitta Haagman (Upsala S)
- 1965 – Birgitta Haagman (Upsala S)
- 1966 – Yvonne Hiljebäck (Stockholmspolisens IF)
- 1967 – Yvonne Hiljebäck (Stockholmspolisens IF)
- 1968 – Yvonne Hiljebäck (Stockholmspolisens IF)
- 1969 – Eva Folkesson (Kristianstads SLS)
- 1970 – Eva Folkesson (Kristianstads SLS)
- 1971 – Eva Folkesson (Kristianstads SLS)
- 1972 – Anita Zarnowiecki (Simavdelningen 1902)
- 1973 – Diana Olsson (Stockholmspolisens IF)
- 1974 – Diana Olsson (Stockholmspolisens IF)
- 1975 – Gunilla Lundberg (Umeå SS)
- 1976 – Cecilia Eklund (Täby Sim)
- 1977 – Tina Gustafsson (Norrköpings KK)
- 1978 – Tina Gustafsson (Norrköpings KK)
- 1979 – Tina Gustafsson (Norrköpings KK)
- 1980 – Pensé Andersen (Landskrona SS)
- 1981 – Johanna Holmén (Västerås SS)
- 1982 – Eva Lundahl (Borlänge SS)
- 1983 – Anna-Karin Eriksson (Kalix SS)
- 1984 – Anna-Karin Eriksson (Kalix SS)
- 1985 – Anna-Karin Eriksson (Kalix SS)
- 1986 – Anna-Karin Eriksson (Kalix SS)
- 1987 – Johanna Larsson (Mariestads SS)
- 1988 – Camilla Olsson (Malmö KK)
- 1989 – Johanna Larsson (Mariestads SS)
- 1990 – Camilla Olsson (Malmö KK)
- 1991 – Anna-Karin Englund (Kalix SS)
- 1992 – Therese Alshammar (Järfälla Sim)
- 1993 – Therese Alshammar (SK Neptun)
- 1994 – Therese Alshammar (SK Neptun)
- 1995 – Therese Alshammar (SK Neptun)
- 1996 – Therese Alshammar (SK Neptun)
- 1997 – Therese Alshammar (SK Neptun)
- 1998 – Therese Alshammar (SK Neptun)
- 1999 – Therese Alshammar (SK Neptun)
- 2000 – Nelly Jörgensen (Helsingborgs S)
- 2001 – Camilla Johansson (Trelleborgs SS)
- 2002 – Susannah Moonan (Södertörns SS)
- 2003 – Susannah Moonan (Södertörns SS)
- 2004 – Carin Möller (Kalmar SS)
- 2005 – Therese Svendsen (SK Ran)
- 2006 – Therese Svendsen (SK Ran)
- 2007 – Carin Möller (Spårvägens SF)
- 2008 – Sarah Sjöström (Södertörns SS)
- 2009 – Sandra Hafström (Helsingborgs S)
- 2010 – Therese Svendsen (SK Ran)
- 2011 – Therese Svendsen (SK Ran)
- 2012 – Therese Alshammar (Täby Sim)
- 2013 – Ida Lindborg (Malmö KK)
- 2014 – Michelle Coleman (Spårvägens SF)
- 2015 – Ida Lindborg (Malmö KK)
- 2016 – Ida Lindborg (Malmö KK)
- 2017 – Michelle Coleman (Spårvägens SF)
- 2018 – Louise Hansson (Helsingborgs S)
- 2019 – Michelle Coleman (Spårvägens SF)
- 2021 – Annie Hegmegi (Jönköpings SS)
- 2022 – Elise Öberg (Njurunda SS)

=== 200 metre backstroke ===
- 1965 – Lena Bengtsson (SK Neptun)
- 1966 – Lena Bengtsson (SK Neptun)
- 1967 – Britt-Marie Hammarsten (Robertsfors SS)
- 1968 – Yvonne Hiljebäck (Stockholmspolisens IF)
- 1969 – Eva Folkesson (Kristianstads SLS)
- 1970 – Eva Folkesson (Kristianstads SLS)
- 1971 – Anita Zarnowiecki (Simavdelningen 1902)
- 1972 – Anita Zarnowiecki (Simavdelningen 1902)
- 1973 – Diana Olsson (Stockholmspolisens IF)
- 1974 – Diana Olsson (Stockholmspolisens IF)
- 1975 – Gunilla Lundberg (Umeå SS)
- 1976 – Tina Gustafsson (Norrköpings KK)
- 1977 – Tina Gustafsson (Norrköpings KK)
- 1978 – Tina Gustafsson (Norrköpings KK)
- 1979 – Tina Gustafsson (Norrköpings KK)
- 1980 – Pensé Andersen (Landskrona SS)
- 1981 – Johanna Holmén (Västerås SS)
- 1982 – Johanna Holmén (Västerås SS)
- 1983 – Sofia Kraft (Götene SS)
- 1984 – Sofia Kraft (Götene SS)
- 1985 – Anna-Karin Eriksson (Kalix SS)
- 1986 – Anna-Karin Eriksson (Kalix SS)
- 1987 – Johanna Larsson (Mariestads SS)
- 1988 – Camilla Olsson (Malmö KK)
- 1989 – Johanna Larsson (Mariestads SS)
- 1990 – Camilla Olsson (Malmö KK)
- 1991 – Camilla Olsson (Malmö KK)
- 1992 – Magdalena Schultz (Malmö KK)
- 1993 – Camilla Johansson (Växjö SS)
- 1994 – Camilla Johansson (Växjö SS)
- 1995 – Annika Rasmusson (Malmö KK)
- 1996 – Camilla Johansson (Växjö SS)
- 1997 – Camilla Johansson (Växjö SS)
- 1998 – Therese Alshammar (SK Neptun)
- 1999 – Camilla Johansson (Växjö SS)
- 2000 – Sofia Svensson (SK Poseidon)
- 2001 – Camilla Johansson (Trelleborgs SS)
- 2002 – Carin Möller (Kalmar SS)
- 2003 – Martina Svensson (Linköpings ASS)
- 2004 – Erika Hegestig (Jönköpings SS)
- 2005 – Therese Svendsen (SK Ran)
- 2006 – Therese Svendsen (SK Ran)
- 2007 – Carin Möller (Spårvägens SF)
- 2008 – Carin Möller (Spårvägens SF)
- 2009 – Therese Svendsen (SK Ran)
- 2010 – Therese Svendsen (SK Ran)
- 2011 – Henriette Stenkvist (Stockholmspolisens IF)
- 2012 – Sandra Hafström (Helsingborgs S)
- 2013 – Sandra Hafström (Helsingborgs S)
- 2014 – Michelle Coleman (Spårvägens SF)
- 2015 – Henriette Stenkvist (SK Neptun)
- 2016 – Michelle Coleman (Spårvägens SF)
- 2017 – Michelle Coleman (Spårvägens SF)
- 2018 – Eygló Òsk Gústafsdóttir (SK Neptun)
- 2019 – Miranda Arvidsson (Kalmar SS)
- 2021 – Annie Hegmegi (Jönköpings SS)
- 2022 – Elise Öberg (Njurunda SS)

=== 50 metre breaststroke ===
- 1993 – Hanna Jaltner (Växjö SS)
- 1994 – Emma Igelström (Karlshamns SK)
- 1995 – Maria Östling (SS Mora)
- 1996 – Hanna Jaltner (Växjö SS)
- 1998 – Maria Östling (Södertörns SS)
- 1999 – Maria Östling (Södertörns SS)
- 2000 – Julia Russell (SK Neptun)
- 2001 – Maria Östling (Södertörns SS)
- 2002 – Emma Igelström (Spårvägens SF)
- 2003 – Emma Igelström (Spårvägens SF)
- 2004 – Maria Östling (Södertörns SS)
- 2005 – Rebecca Ejdervik (Täby Sim)
- 2006 – Rebecca Ejdervik (Täby Sim)
- 2007 – Hanna Eriksson (Södertälje SS)
- 2008 – Rebecca Ejdervik (Täby Sim)
- 2009 – Rebecca Ejdervik (Täby Sim)
- 2010 – Jennie Johansson (Upsala S)
- 2011 – Jennie Johansson (Upsala S)
- 2012 – Jennie Johansson (Upsala S)
- 2013 – Jennie Johansson (Upsala S)
- 2014 – Jennie Johansson (SK Neptun)
- 2015 – Jennie Johansson (SK Neptun)
- 2016 – Jennie Johansson (SK Neptun)
- 2017 – Jennie Johansson (SK Neptun)
- 2018 – Sophie Hansson (Helsingborgs S)
- 2019 – Sophie Hansson (Helsingborgs S)
- 2021 – Cecilia Viberg (Stockholms KK)
- 2022 – Klara Thormalm (Jönköpings SS)

=== 100 metre breaststroke ===
- 1948 – Anna-Lis Blomqvist (Jönköpings SLS)
- 1953 – Berit Mattsson (Örebro SS)
- 1961 – Barbro Eriksson (Nyköpings SS)
- 1962 – Christina Olsson (Limhamns SS)
- 1963 – Agneta Berg (Göteborgs KK)
- 1964 – Monika Israelsson (Karlskrona SS)
- 1965 – Monika Israelsson (Karlskrona SS)
- 1966 – Britt-Marie Lahti (Bodens BK)
- 1967 – Yvonne Brage (Skövde SS)
- 1968 – Yvonne Brage (Skövde SS)
- 1969 – Yvonne Brage (Skövde SS)
- 1970 – Yvonne Brage (Skövde SS)
- 1971 – Britt-Marie Smedh (Stockholmspolisens IF)
- 1972 – Britt-Marie Smedh (Stockholmspolisens IF)
- 1973 – Britt-Marie Smedh (Stockholmspolisens IF)
- 1974 – Jeanette Petersson (SK Najaden)
- 1975 – Jeanette Petersson (SK Najaden)
- 1976 – Eva-Marie Håkansson (Kristianstads SLS)
- 1977 – Eva-Marie Håkansson (Kristianstads SLS)
- 1978 – Eva-Marie Håkansson (Kristianstads SLS)
- 1979 – Ann-Sofi Roos (Kristianstads SLS)
- 1980 – Eva-Marie Håkansson (Kristianstads SLS)
- 1981 – Eva-Marie Håkansson (Kristianstads SLS)
- 1982 – Eva-Marie Håkansson (Kristianstads SLS)
- 1983 – Eva-Marie Håkansson (Kristianstads SLS)
- 1984 – Eva-Marie Håkansson (Kristianstads SLS)
- 1985 – Annelie Holmström (Stockholmspolisens IF)
- 1986 – Annelie Holmström (Stockholmspolisens IF)
- 1987 – Lisa Lönn (SS Mora)
- 1988 – Anna-Karin Persson (Kungälvs SS)
- 1989 – Anna-Karin Persson (Kungälvs SS)
- 1990 – Anna-Karin Persson (Kungälvs SS)
- 1991 – Charlotte Humling (Sandvikens SoHK)
- 1992 – Hanna Jaltner (Växjö SS)
- 1993 – Hanna Jaltner (Växjö SS)
- 1994 – Emma Igelström (Karlshamns SK)
- 1995 – Maria Östling (SS Mora)
- 1996 – Lena Eriksson (Spårvägens SF)
- 1997 – Hanna Jaltner (Växjö SS)
- 1998 – Hanna Jaltner (Växjö SS) and Maria Östling (Södertörns SS)
- 1999 – Maria Östling (Södertörns SS)
- 2000 – Maria Östling (Södertörns SS)
- 2001 – Maria Östling (Södertörns SS)
- 2002 – Emma Igelström (Spårvägens SF)
- 2003 – Emma Igelström (Spårvägens SF)
- 2004 – Maria Östling (Södertörns SS)
- 2005 – Josefin Wede (SK Sydsim)
- 2006 – Rebecca Ejdervik (Täby Sim)
- 2007 – Joline Höglund (Göteborg Sim)
- 2008 – Joline Höstman (Göteborg Sim)
- 2009 – Rebecca Ejdervik (Täby Sim)
- 2010 – Jennie Johansson (Upsala S)
- 2011 – Jennie Johansson (Upsala S)
- 2012 – Jennie Johansson (Upsala S)
- 2013 – Jennie Johansson (Upsala S)
- 2014 – Jennie Johansson (SK Neptun)
- 2015 – Amanda Rutqvist (Göteborg Sim)
- 2016 – Jennie Johansson (SK Neptun)
- 2017 – Jennie Johansson (SK Neptun)
- 2018 – Sophie Hansson (Helsingborgs S)
- 2019 – Sophie Hansson (Helsingborgs S)
- 2021 – Klara Thormalm (Jönköpings SS)
- 2022 – Klara Thormalm (Jönköpings SS)

=== 200 metre breaststroke ===
- 1921 – Margit Bratt (Stockholms KK)
- 1922 – Wivan Pettersson (Eskilstuna SS)
- 1923 – Hjördis Töpel (SK Najaden)
- 1924 – Wivan Pettersson (Eskilstuna SS)
- 1925 – Wivan Pettersson (Eskilstuna SS)
- 1926 – Brita Hazelius (IFK Falun)
- 1927 – Marianne Gustafsson (Eskilstuna SS)
- 1928 – Brita Hazelius (IFK Falun)
- 1929 – Brita Hazelius (IFK Falun)
- 1930 – Brita Hazelius (IFK Falun)
- 1931 – Kerstin Isberg (IFK Stockholm)
- 1932 – Kerstin Isberg (IFK Stockholm)
- 1933 – Inga Jönnson (SK Ran)
- 1934 – Inga-Lill Hermansson (SK Najaden)
- 1935 – Maj-Britt Andersson (Limhamns SS)
- 1936 – Kerstin Isberg (IFK Stockholm)
- 1937 – Maj-Britt Andersson (Limhamns SS)
- 1938 – Maj-Britt Andersson (Limhamns SS)
- 1939 – Maj-Britt Andersson (Limhamns SS)
- 1940 – Inga-Lill Hermansson (SK Najaden)
- 1941 – Ingrid Wallin (IFK Stockholm)
- 1942 – Doris Ek (Örebro SS)
- 1943 – Maj-Britt Jansson (Limhamns SS)
- 1944 – Marianne Nilsson (Malmö S)
- 1945 – Marianne Fernlund (Stockholms KK)
- 1946 – Marianne Fernlund (Stockholms KK)
- 1947 – Marianne Fernlund (Stockholms KK)
- 1948 – Marianne Fernlund (Stockholms KK)
- 1949 – Marianne Fernlund (Stockholms KK)
- 1950 – Beth Johansson (Karlstads SS)
- 1951 – Ulla-Britt Eklund (SK Neptun)
- 1952 – Ulla-Britt Eklund (SK Neptun)
- 1953 – Ruth Wester (SK Neptun)
- 1954 – Kerstin Pettersson (IF Elfsborg)
- 1955 – Marianne Pavoni (SK Neptun)
- 1956 – Gun-Britt Mellberg (Brännans IF)
- 1957 – Gun-Britt Mellberg (Brännans IF)
- 1958 – Marianne Johansson (SK Neptun)
- 1959 – Margareta Winquist (SK Neptun)
- 1960 – Barbro Eriksson (Nyköpings SS)
- 1961 – Barbro Eriksson (Nyköpings SS)
- 1962 – Marianne Sjöström (Malmö S)
- 1963 – Kristina Kallerhult (Nyköpings SS)
- 1964 – Monica Israelsson (Karlskrona SS)
- 1965 – Yvonne Brage (Skövde SS)
- 1966 – Yvonne Brage (Skövde SS)
- 1967 – Yvonne Brage (Skövde SS)
- 1968 – Yvonne Brage (Skövde SS)
- 1969 – Yvonne Brage (Skövde SS)
- 1970 – Yvonne Brage (Skövde SS)
- 1971 – Yvonne Brage (Skövde SS)
- 1972 – Britt-Marie Smedh (Stockholmspolisens IF)
- 1973 – Britt-Marie Smedh (Stockholmspolisens IF)
- 1974 – Britt-Marie Smedh (Stockholmspolisens IF)
- 1975 – Ann-Sofi Roos (Kristianstads SLS)
- 1976 – Ann-Sofi Roos (Kristianstads SLS)
- 1977 – Ingela Havaas (Skövde SS)
- 1978 – Ingela Havaas (Skövde SS)
- 1979 – Ann-Sofi Roos (Kristianstads SLS)
- 1980 – Ann-Sofi Roos (Kristianstads SLS)
- 1981 – Eva-Marie Håkansson (Kristianstads SLS)
- 1982 – Eva-Marie Håkansson (Kristianstads SLS)
- 1983 – Annelie Holmström (Stockholmspolisens IF)
- 1984 – Annelie Holmström (Stockholmspolisens IF)
- 1985 – Åsa Hedlund (Linköpings ASS)
- 1986 – Anna Rosengren (SS Mora)
- 1987 – Helena Kälvehed (SK Korrugal)
- 1988 – Anna-Karin Persson (Kungälvs SS)
- 1989 – Anna-Karin Persson (Kungälvs SS)
- 1990 – Anna-Karin Persson (Kungälvs SS)
- 1991 – Charlotte Humling (Sandvikens SoHK)
- 1992 – Anna-Karin Dahlström (Ängelholms SS)
- 1993 – Charlotte Humling (Södertälje SS)
- 1994 – Lena Eriksson (Spårvägens SF)
- 1995 – Maria Östling (SS Mora)
- 1996 – Lena Eriksson (Spårvägens SF)
- 1997 – Maria Östling (Södertörns SS)
- 1998 – Emma Igelström (Karlshamns SK)
- 1999 – Emma Igelström (Spårvägens SF)
- 2000 – Emma Igelström (Spårvägens SF)
- 2001 – Sara Larsson (Ludvika SS)
- 2002 – Emma Igelström (Spårvägens SF)
- 2003 – Emma Igelström (Spårvägens SF)
- 2004 – Sara Larsson (Ludvika SS)
- 2005 – Josefin Wede (SK Sydsim)
- 2006 – Sandra Jacobson (Täby Sim)
- 2007 – Joline Höglund (Göteborg Sim)
- 2008 – Joline Höstman (Göteborg Sim)
- 2009 – Una Finnman (SK Ran)
- 2010 – Joline Höstman (Göteborg Sim)
- 2011 – Jennie Johansson (Upsala S)
- 2012 – Joline Höstman (Mölndals ASS)
- 2013 – Joline Höstman (Mölndals ASS)
- 2014 – Jennie Johansson (SK Neptun)
- 2015 – Amanda Rutqvist (Göteborg Sim)
- 2016 – Jennie Johansson (SK Neptun)
- 2017 – Sophie Hansson (Helsingborgs S)
- 2018 – Sophie Hansson (Helsingborgs S)
- 2019 – Sophie Hansson (Helsingborgs S)
- 2021 – Moa Bergdahl (SK Laxen)
- 2022 – Julia Månsson (Örebro Simallians)

=== 50 metre butterfly ===
- 1994 – Anna Lindberg (Helsingborgs S)
- 1995 – Louise Karlsson (Skärets SS)
- 1996 – Johanna Sjöberg (Helsingborgs S)
- 1998 – Anna-Karin Kammerling (Sundsvalls SS)
- 1999 – Anna-Karin Kammerling (Sundsvalls SS)
- 2000 – Therese Alshammar (SK Neptun)
- 2001 – Anna-Karin Kammerling (Sundsvalls SS)
- 2002 – Anna-Karin Kammerling (Sundsvalls SS)
- 2003 – Anna-Karin Kammerling (Sundsvalls SS)
- 2004 – Anna-Karin Kammerling (Sundsvalls SS)
- 2005 – Therese Alshammar (SK Neptun)
- 2006 – Therese Alshammar (SK Neptun)
- 2007 – Therese Alshammar (SK Neptun)
- 2008 – Therese Alshammar (SK Neptun)
- 2009 – Therese Alshammar (Täby Sim)
- 2010 – Sarah Sjöström (Södertörns SS)
- 2011 – Sarah Sjöström (Södertörns SS)
- 2012 – Lucy Worall (Helsingborgs S)
- 2013 – Sarah Sjöström (Södertörns SS)
- 2014 – Sarah Sjöström (Södertörns SS)
- 2015 – Sarah Sjöström (Södertörns SS)
- 2016 – Sarah Sjöström (Södertörns SS)
- 2017 – Sarah Sjöström (Södertörns SS)
- 2018 – Sarah Sjöström (Södertörns SS)
- 2019 – Sara Junevik (Falu SS)
- 2021 – Ida Liljeqvist (Helsingborgs S)
- 2022 – Sara Junevik (Falu SS)

=== 100 metre butterfly ===
- 1949 – Ulla-Britt Eklund (SK Neptun)
- 1950 – Ulla-Britt Eklund (SK Neptun)
- 1951 – Ulla-Britt Eklund (SK Neptun)
- 1952 – Ulla-Britt Eklund (SK Neptun)
- 1954 – Ulla-Britt Eklund (SK Neptun)
- 1955 – Birgitta Lundqvist (Karlskoga SS)
- 1956 – Birgitta Lundqvist (SK Neptun)
- 1957 – Birgitta Lundqvist (SK Neptun)
- 1958 – Birgitta Lundqvist (SK Neptun)
- 1959 – Kristina Larsson (SK Ran)
- 1960 – Kristina Larsson (SK Ran)
- 1961 – Karin Stenbäck (SK Neptun)
- 1962 – Karin Stenbäck (SK Neptun)
- 1963 – Karin Stenbäck (SK Neptun)
- 1964 – Lotten Andersson (Timrå AIF)
- 1965 – Lotten Andersson (Linköpings ASS)
- 1966 – Ingrid Gustavsson (Luleå SS)
- 1967 – Ingrid Gustavsson (Luleå SS)
- 1968 – Lotten Andersson (Linköpings ASS)
- 1969 – Elisabeth Hjort (Gävle SS)
- 1970 – Eva Wikner (Stockholmspolisens IF)
- 1971 – Eva Wikner (Stockholmspolisens IF)
- 1972 – Eva Wikner (Stockholmspolisens IF)
- 1973 – Gunilla Andersson (SK Neptun)
- 1974 – Gunilla Andersson (SK Neptun)
- 1975 – Gunilla Andersson (SK Neptun)
- 1976 – Gunilla Andersson (SK Neptun)
- 1977 – Lena de Val (Linköpings ASS)
- 1978 – Agneta Mårtensson (Karlslunds IF)
- 1979 – Agneta Mårtensson (Karlslunds IF)
- 1980 – Agneta Mårtensson (Karlslunds IF)
- 1981 – Armi Airaksinen (Stockholmspolisens IF)
- 1982 – Agneta Eriksson (Västerås SS)
- 1983 – Agneta Eriksson (Västerås SS)
- 1984 – Agneta Eriksson (Västerås SS)
- 1985 – Agneta Eriksson (Västerås SS)
- 1986 – Agneta Eriksson (Västerås SS)
- 1987 – Agneta Eriksson (Västerås SS)
- 1988 – Annlo Edenholm (Södertörns SS)
- 1989 – Therèse Lundin (Simavdelningen 1902)
- 1990 – Anna Lindberg (Helsingborgs S)
- 1991 – Therèse Lundin (Simavdelningen 1902)
- 1992 – Therèse Lundin (Simavdelningen 1902)
- 1993 – Therèse Lundin (Helsingborgs S)
- 1994 – Louise Jöhncke (Spårvägens SF)
- 1995 – Johanna Sjöberg (Helsingborgs S)
- 1996 – Johanna Sjöberg (Helsingborgs S)
- 1997 – Johanna Sjöberg (Helsingborgs S)
- 1998 – Anna-Karin Kammerling (Sundsvalls SS)
- 1999 – Johanna Sjöberg (Södertälje SS)
- 2000 – Sara Nordenstam (Väsby SS)
- 2001 – Johanna Sjöberg (Södertälje SS)
- 2002 – Anna-Karin Kammerling (Sundsvalls SS)
- 2003 – Anna-Karin Kammerling (Sundsvalls SS)
- 2004 – Anna-Karin Kammerling (Sundsvalls SS)
- 2005 – Johanna Sjöberg (Spårvägens SF)
- 2006 – Anna-Karin Kammerling (Sundsvalls SS)
- 2007 – Petra Granlund (Väsby SS)
- 2008 – Sarah Sjöström (Södertörns SS)
- 2009 – Therese Alshammar (Täby Sim)
- 2010 – Sarah Sjöström (Södertörns SS)
- 2011 – Sarah Sjöström (Södertörns SS)
- 2012 – Martina Granström (Jönköpings SS)
- 2013 – Sarah Sjöström (Södertörns SS)
- 2014 – Sarah Sjöström (Södertörns SS)
- 2015 – Sarah Sjöström (Södertörns SS)
- 2016 – Sarah Sjöström (Södertörns SS)
- 2017 – Sarah Sjöström (Södertörns SS)
- 2018 – Sarah Sjöström (Södertörns SS)
- 2019 – Sarah Sjöström (Södertörns SS)
- 2021 – Hanna Eriksson (Jönköpings SS)
- 2022 – Louise Hansson (Helsingborgs S)

=== 200 metre butterfly ===
- 1953 – Ulla-Britt Eklund (SK Neptun)
- 1969 – Eva Wikner (Stockholmspolisens IF)
- 1970 – Eva Wikner (Stockholmspolisens IF)
- 1971 – Eva Wikner (Stockholmspolisens IF)
- 1972 – Eva Wikner (Stockholmspolisens IF)
- 1973 – Gunilla Andersson (SK Neptun)
- 1974 – Gunilla Andersson (SK Neptun)
- 1975 – Gunilla Andersson (SK Neptun)
- 1976 – Lena de Val (Linköpings ASS)
- 1977 – Lena de Val (Linköpings ASS)
- 1978 – Agneta Mårtensson (Karlslunds IF)
- 1979 – Agneta Mårtensson (Karlslunds IF)
- 1980 – Armi Airaksinen (Stockholmspolisens IF)
- 1981 – Agneta Mårtensson (Karlslunds IF)
- 1982 – Ann Carlsson (Skövde SS)
- 1983 – Annelie Wennberg (Spårvägens GoIF)
- 1984 – Ann Carlsson (Malmö KK)
- 1985 – Eva Jonasson (Ölands SK)
- 1986 – Annelie Wennberg (Spårvägens GoIF)
- 1987 – Annlo Edenholm (Södertörns SS)
- 1988 – Anette Philipsson (Linköpings ASS)
- 1989 – Therèse Lundin (Simavdelningen 1902)
- 1990 – Therèse Lundin (Simavdelningen 1902)
- 1991 – Malin Strömberg (Ystads SS)
- 1992 – Therèse Lundin (Simavdelningen 1902)
- 1993 – Malin Strömberg (Ystads SS)
- 1994 – Mikaela Laurén (Södertälje SS)
- 1995 – Mikaela Laurén (SK Neptun)
- 1996 – Mikaela Laurén (SK Neptun)
- 1997 – Johanna Sjöberg (Helsingborgs S)
- 1998 – Sara Nordenstam (Skärets SS)
- 1999 – Sara Nordenstam (Skärets SS)
- 2000 – Destiny Laurén (SK Neptun)
- 2001 – Sara Nordenstam (Väsby SS)
- 2002 – Sara Nordenstam (Väsby SS)
- 2003 – Mia Brodén (Falu SS)
- 2004 – Petra Granlund (S 77 Stenungsund)
- 2005 – Petra Granlund (S 77 Stenungsund)
- 2006 – Petra Granlund (S 77 Stenungsund)
- 2007 – Petra Granlund (Väsby SS)
- 2008 – Petra Granlund (Väsby SS)
- 2009 – Martina Granström (Jönköpings SS)
- 2010 – Martina Granström (Jönköpings SS)
- 2011 – Martina Granström (Jönköpings SS)
- 2012 – Martina Granström (Jönköpings SS)
- 2013 – Martina Granström (Jönköpings SS)
- 2014 – Ida Marko-Varga (SK Triton)
- 2015 – Ida Marko-Varga (SK Triton)
- 2016 – Ida Marko-Varga (SK Triton)
- 2017 – Hanna Eriksson (Jönköpings SS)
- 2018 – Louise Hansson (Helsingborgs S)
- 2019 – Ida Marko-Varga (SK Triton)
- 2021 – Thea Brünjes (Kiviks SK)
- 2022 – Edith Jernstedt (Västerås SS)

=== 200 metre individual medley ===
- 1961 – Karin Larsson (SK Ran)
- 1965 – Britt Julander (Gävle SS)
- 1966 – Lotten Andersson (Linköpings ASS)
- 1967 – Ingrid Gustavsson (Luleå SS)
- 1968 – Yvonne Brage (Skövde SS)
- 1969 – Anita Zarnowiecki (Simavdelningen 1902)
- 1970 – Anita Zarnowiecki (Simavdelningen 1902)
- 1971 – Anita Zarnowiecki (Simavdelningen 1902)
- 1972 – Anita Zarnowiecki (Simavdelningen 1902)
- 1973 – Diana Olsson (Stockholmspolisens IF)
- 1974 – Diana Olsson (Stockholmspolisens IF)
- 1975 – Anita Zarnowiecki (Simavdelningen 1902)
- 1976 – Diana Olsson (Stockholmspolisens IF)
- 1977 – Monica Parsmark (Hudiksvalls SS)
- 1978 – Ann-Sofi Roos (Kristianstads SLS)
- 1979 – Ann-Sofi Roos (Kristianstads SLS)
- 1980 – Ann-Sofi Roos (Kristianstads SLS)
- 1981 – Anette Philipsson (Linköpings ASS)
- 1982 – Anette Philipsson (Linköpings ASS)
- 1983 – Maria Kardum (Kristianstads SLS)
- 1984 – Maria Kardum (Kristianstads SLS)
- 1985 – Anna-Karin Eriksson (Kalix SS)
- 1986 – Helena Kälvehed (SK Korrugal)
- 1987 – Anette Philipsson (Linköpings ASS)
- 1988 – Anette Philipsson (Linköpings ASS)
- 1989 – Helena Kälvehed (SK Korrugal)
- 1990 – Malin Gustavsson (Kristianstads SLS)
- 1991 – Malin Gustavsson (Helsingborgs S)
- 1992 – Magdalena Schultz (Malmö KK)
- 1993 – Ulrika Jardfeldt (Turebergs IF)
- 1994 – Ulrika Jardfeldt (Turebergs IF)
- 1995 – Louise Karlsson (Skärets SS)
- 1996 – Louise Karlsson (Skärets SS)
- 1997 – Malin Svahnström (Väsby SS)
- 1998 – Sara Nordenstam (Skärets SS)
- 1999 – Malin Svahnström (Väsby SS)
- 2000 – Sara Nordenstam (Väsby SS)
- 2001 – Sara Nordenstam (Väsby SS)
- 2002 – Emma Igelström (Spårvägens SF)
- 2003 – Sara Nordenstam (Väsby SS)
- 2004 – Josefin Lillhage (Väsby SS)
- 2005 – Josefin Lillhage (Väsby SS)
- 2006 – Josefin Lillhage (Väsby SS)
- 2007 – Sara Thydén (Kalmar SS)
- 2008 – Josefin Lillhage (Väsby SS)
- 2009 – Sara Thydén (Väsby SS)
- 2010 – Sara Thydén (Väsby SS)
- 2011 – Sara Thydén (Väsby SS)
- 2012 – Martina Granström (Jönköpings SS)
- 2013 – Stina Gardell (Spårvägens SF)
- 2014 – Louise Hansson (Helsingborgs S)
- 2015 – Louise Hansson (Helsingborgs S)
- 2016 – Louise Hansson (Helsingborgs S)
- 2017 – Louise Hansson (Helsingborgs S)
- 2018 – Sophie Hansson (Helsingborgs S)
- 2019 – Hannah Brunzell (Västerås SS)
- 2021 – Hanna Bergman (SK Poseidon)
- 2022 – Lisa Nystrand (SK Neptun)

=== 400 metre individual medley ===
- 1962 – Elisabeth Ljunggren (SK Neptun)
- 1963 – Elisabeth Ljunggren (SK Neptun)
- 1964 – Elisabeth Ljunggren (SK Neptun)
- 1965 – Elisabeth Berglund (Timrå AIF)
- 1966 – Elisabeth Ljunggren (SK Neptun)
- 1967 – Ingrid Gustavsson (Luleå SS)
- 1968 – Ingrid Gustavsson (Luleå SS)
- 1969 – Gunilla Wikman (Stockholmspolisens IF)
- 1970 – Anita Zarnowiecki (Simavdelningen 1902)
- 1971 – Anita Zarnowiecki (Simavdelningen 1902)
- 1972 – Anita Zarnowiecki (Simavdelningen 1902)
- 1973 – Anita Zarnowiecki (Simavdelningen 1902)
- 1974 – Anita Zarnowiecki (Simavdelningen 1902)
- 1975 – Anita Zarnowiecki (Simavdelningen 1902)
- 1976 – Carolina Eriksson (Södertälje SS)
- 1977 – Ann-Sofi Roos (Kristianstads SLS)
- 1978 – Ann-Sofi Roos (Kristianstads SLS)
- 1979 – Ann-Sofi Roos (Kristianstads SLS)
- 1980 – Ann-Sofi Roos (Kristianstads SLS)
- 1981 – Sofia Kraft (Götene SS)
- 1982 – Anette Philipsson (Linköpings ASS)
- 1983 – Sofia Kraft (Götene SS)
- 1984 – Sofia Kraft (Götene SS)
- 1985 – Sofia Kraft (SK Ran)
- 1986 – Anette Philipsson (Linköpings ASS)
- 1987 – Sofia Kraft (SK Ran)
- 1988 – Anette Philipsson (Linköpings ASS)
- 1989 – Anna-Lena Nilsson (Malmö KK)
- 1990 – Veronika Svensson (Ystads SS)
- 1991 – Andrea Bolin (Jönköpings SS)
- 1992 – Magdalena Schultz (Malmö KK)
- 1993 – Magdalena Schultz (Malmö KK)
- 1994 – Ann-Sofie Jönsson (Tunafors SK)
- 1995 – Magdalena Schultz (Södertälje SS)
- 1996 – Malin Svahnström (Väsby SS)
- 1997 – Josefin Lindgren (Ystads SS)
- 1998 – Sara Nordenstam (Skärets SS)
- 1999 – Sara Nordenstam (Skärets SS)
- 2000 – Sara Nordenstam (Väsby SS)
- 2001 – Sara Nordenstam (Väsby SS)
- 2002 – Sara Nordenstam (Väsby SS)
- 2003 – Sara Nordenstam (Väsby SS)
- 2004 – Ann Berglund (Jönköpings SS)
- 2005 – Sara Thydén (Kalmar SS)
- 2006 – Sara Thydén (Kalmar SS)
- 2007 – Eva Berglund (Jönköpings SS)
- 2008 – Sara Thydén (Väsby SS)
- 2009 – Sara Thydén (Väsby SS)
- 2010 – Sara Thydén (Väsby SS)
- 2011 – Stina Gardell (Spårvägens SF)
- 2012 – Stina Gardell (Spårvägens SF)
- 2013 – Stina Gardell (Spårvägens SF)
- 2014 – Stina Gardell (Spårvägens SF)
- 2015 – Stina Gardell (Spårvägens SF)
- 2016 – Stina Gardell (Spårvägens SF)
- 2017 – Jaqueline Hippi (SK Neptun)
- 2018 – Jaqueline Hippi (SK Neptun)
- 2019 – Christine Ekman (SK Neptun)
- 2021 – Christine Ekman (SK Neptun)
- 2022 – Tea Winblad (Malmö KK)

=== 4 × 50 metre freestyle relay ===
- 1993 – Norrköpings KK
- 1994 – Helsingborgs S
- 1995 – Helsingborgs S
- 1996 – Helsingborgs S

=== 4 × 100 metre freestyle relay ===
- 1934 – Malmö S
- 1935 – Stockholms KK
- 1936 – Stockholms KK
- 1937 – Jönköpings SLS
- 1938 – Stockholms KK
- 1939 – Stockholms KK
- 1940 – Stockholms KK
- 1941 – IFK Stockholm
- 1942 – IFK Stockholm
- 1943 – IFK Stockholm
- 1944 – IFK Stockholm
- 1945 – Stockholms KK
- 1946 – IFK Stockholm
- 1947 – Stockholms KK
- 1948 – Stockholms KK
- 1949 – IFK Stockholm
- 1950 – Karlskoga SS
- 1951 – IF Elfsborg
- 1952 – SK Neptun
- 1953 – SK Neptun
- 1954 – SK Neptun
- 1955 – SK Neptun
- 1956 – SK Neptun
- 1957 – SK Ran
- 1958 – SK Ran (Barbro Andersson, Nin Persson, Karin Larsson & Kristina Larsson)
- 1959 – SK Ran (Nin Persson, Barbro Andersson, Karin Larsson & Kristina Larsson)
- 1960 – SK Neptun (Birgitta Friberg, Jane Cederqvist, Karin Stenbäck & Bibbi Segerström)
- 1961 – SK Neptun (Margareta Rylander, Jane Cederqvist, Karin Stenbäck & Bibbi Segerström)
- 1962 – SK Neptun (Ann-Christine Hagberg, Agneta Thunell, Ulla Jacobsson & Karin Stenbäck)
- 1963 – SK Neptun (Ann-Christine Hagberg, Agneta Thunell, Majvor Welander & Karin Stenbäck)
- 1964 – SK Neptun
- 1965 – SK Neptun
- 1966 – SK Neptun
- 1967 – Västerås SS
- 1968 – Timrå AIF
- 1969 – Stockholmspolisens IF (Anna-Lena Jönsson, Eva Wikner, Lena Isaksson & Gunilla Wikman)
- 1970 – Stockholmspolisens IF
- 1971 – Gävle SS
- 1972 – Stockholmspolisens IF
- 1973 – Simavdelningen 1902
- 1974 – Stockholmspolisens IF
- 1975 – Kristianstads SLS
- 1976 – Kristianstads SLS
- 1977 – Stockholmspolisens IF
- 1978 – Västerås SS
- 1979 – Kristianstads SLS
- 1980 – Kristianstads SLS
- 1981 – Stockholmspolisens IF
- 1982 – Stockholmspolisens IF (Ylva Noring, Helen Ögren, Maja-Lena Deckner & Armi Airaksinen)
- 1983 – Stockholmspolisens IF (Armi Airaksinen, Maja-Lena Deckner, Helen Ögren & Ylva Noring)
- 1984 – Kristianstads SLS
- 1985 – Kristianstads SLS (Anna Hansen, Maria Norberg, Eva Axelsson & Maria Kardum)
- 1986 – Kristianstads SLS
- 1987 – Kristianstads SLS
- 1988 – Kristianstads SLS (Annika Nilsson, Malin Gustavsson, Maria Kardum & Kicki Myrbro)
- 1989 – Upsala S
- 1989 – Helsingborgs S
- 1990 – Malmö KK
- 1991 – Järfälla Sim (Ulrika Wikström, Catharina Mattsson, Malin Sandorf & Louise Jöhncke)
- 1992 – Malmö KK
- 1993 – Malmö KK
- 1994 – Spårvägens SF
- 1995 – Helsingborgs S
- 1996 – Helsingborgs S
- 1997 – Helsingborgs S (Johanna Sjöberg, Helena Åberg, Nina Johnson & Nelly Jörgensen)
- 1998 – Göteborg Sim (Claire Hedenskog, Malin Nilsson, Anna Ericson & Josefin Lillhage)
- 1999 – Malmö KK (Lisa Wänberg, Lotta Wänberg, Jenny Redlund & Camilla Helgesson)
- 2000 – SK Neptun (Julia Russell, Jessica Lidström, Therese Alshammar & Destiny Laurén)
- 2001 – Väsby SS (Charlotte Kristiansen, Josefin Lillhage, Malin Svahnström & Sara Nordenstam)
- 2002 – Väsby SS (Malin Svahnström, Josefin Lillhage, Gabriella Fagundez & Denise Helgesson)
- 2003 – Väsby SS (Denise Helgesson, Josefin Lillhage, Gabriella Fagundez & Malin Svahnström)
- 2004 – Väsby SS (Gabriella Fagundez, Malin Svahnström, Therese Mattsson & Josefin Lillhage)
- 2005 – Väsby SS (Gabriella Fagundez, Josefin Lillhage, Malin Svahnström & Therese Mattsson)
- 2006 – Väsby SS (Gabriella Fagundez, Josefin Lillhage, Malin Svahnström & Therese Mattsson)
- 2007 – Väsby SS (Ida Sandin, Josefin Lillhage, Petra Granlund & Malin Svahnström)
- 2008 – Väsby SS (Ida Sandin, Josefin Lillhage, Petra Granlund & Malin Svahnström)
- 2009 – Väsby SS (Therese Mattsson, Josefin Lillhage, Petra Granlund & Ida Sandin)
- 2010 – Väsby SS (Ida Sandin, Josefin Lillhage, Petra Granlund & Sara Thydén)
- 2011 – Väsby SS (Josefin Lindkvist, Gabriella Fagundez, Petra Granlund & Ida Sandin)
- 2012 – Täby Sim (Michelle Coleman, Lovisa Ericsson, Elsa Ericsson & Therese Alshammar)
- 2013 – Väsby SS (Josefin Lindkvist, Agnes Wiiand, Petra Granlund & Nadja Salomonsson)
- 2014 – SK Triton (Alba Forés, Ida Marko-Varga, Moa Ståhl & Magdalena Kuras)
- 2015 – SK Triton (Alba Forés, Ida Marko-Varga, Moa Ståhl & Magdalena Kuras)
- 2016 – Spårvägens SF (Stina Gardell, Michelle Coleman, Emma Wahlström & Emma Sundstedt)
- 2017 – Spårvägens SF (Michelle Coleman, Emma Sundstedt, Emma Wahlström & Malin Wallén)
- 2018 – Helsingborgs S (Louise Hansson, Sophie Hansson, Alicia Lundblad & Olivia Ülger)
- 2019 – Jönköpings SS (Alma Thormalm, Klara Thormalm, Wilma Johansson & Hanna Eriksson)
- 2021 – Jönköpings SS (Hanna Eriksson, Klara Thormalm, Alma Thormalm & Wilma Johansson)
- 2022 – Jönköpings SS (Alma Thormalm, Klara Thormalm, Annie Hegmegi & Hanna Eriksson)

=== 4 × 200 metre freestyle relay ===
- 1980 – Kristianstads SLS
- 1981 – Västerås SS
- 1982 – Stockholmspolisens IF
- 1983 – Stockholmspolisens IF
- 1984 – Stockholmspolisens IF
- 1985 – Kristianstads SLS (Anna Hansen, Malin Gustavsson, Maria Norberg & Maria Kardum)
- 1986 – Kristianstads SLS
- 1987 – Mariestads SS (Eva Hjelm, Karin Strömberg, Johanna Larsson & Eva Nyberg)
- 1988 – Kristianstads SLS
- 1989 – Malmö KK
- 1990 – Malmö KK
- 1991 – Malmö KK (Anna-Lena Nilsson, Annika Rasmusson, Cecilia Holm & Malin Nilsson)
- 1992 – Malmö KK
- 1993 – Malmö KK
- 1994 – Malmö KK
- 1995 – Malmö KK
- 1996 – Malmö KK
- 1997 – Simavdelningen 1902 (Josefin Lillhage, Claire Hedenskog, Malin Nilsson & Anna Ericson)
- 1998 – Malmö KK (Lotta Wänberg, Lisa Wänberg, Jenny Redlund & Camilla Helgesson)
- 1999 – Malmö KK (Lotta Wänberg, Jenny Redlund, Helen Svensson & Camilla Helgesson)
- 2000 – Malmö KK (Lotta Wänberg, Jenny Redlund, Lisa Wänberg & Camilla Helgesson)
- 2001 – Malmö KK (Lotta Wänberg, Jenny Redlund, Linda Erlandsson & Lisa Wänberg)
- 2002 – Väsby SS (Malin Svahnström, Josefin Lillhage, Sara Nordenstam & Denise Helgesson)
- 2003 – Väsby SS (Malin Svahnström, Josefin Lillhage, Denise Helgesson & Gabriella Fagundez)
- 2004 – Väsby SS (Malin Svahnström, Denise Helgesson, Gabriella Fagundez & Josefin Lillhage)
- 2005 – Väsby SS (Gabriella Fagundez, Therese Mattsson, Josefin Lillhage & Malin Svahnström)
- 2006 – Väsby SS (Gabriella Fagundez, Josefin Lillhage, Malin Svahnström & Ida Sandin)
- 2007 – Väsby SS (Petra Granlund, Malin Svahnström, Josefin Lillhage & Ida Sandin)
- 2008 – Väsby SS (Ida Sandin, Josefin Lillhage, Petra Granlund & Malin Svahnström)
- 2009 – Väsby SS (Petra Granlund, Josefin Lillhage, Sara Thydén & Ida Sandin)
- 2010 – Väsby SS (Sara Thydén, Josefin Lillhage, Petra Granlund & Ida Sandin)
- 2011 – Väsby SS (Sara Thydén, Ida Sandin, Petra Granlund & Gabriella Fagundez)
- 2012 – Väsby SS (Josefin Lindkvist, Petra Granlund, Gabriella Fagundez & Nadja Salomonsson)
- 2013 – Väsby SS (Josefine Hippi, Agnes Wiiand, Jacqueline Hippi & Nadja Salomonsson)
- 2014 – Väsby SS (Jaqueline Hippi, Agnes Wiiand, Josefin Lindkvist & Nadja Salomonsson)
- 2015 – SK Triton (Alba Forés, Amanda Granborg, Ida Marko-Varga & Moa Ståhl)
- 2016 – Spårvägens SF (Michelle Coleman, Emma Wahlström, Stina Gardell & Emma Sundstedt)
- 2017 – Spårvägens SF (Emma Sundstedt, Michelle Coleman, Malin Wallén & Emma Wahlström)
- 2018 – Helsingborgs S (Louise Hansson, Alicia Lundblad, Matilda Weiler & Sophie Hansson)
- 2019 – Jönköpings SS (Hanna Eriksson, Alma Thormalm, Klara Thormalm & Wilma Johansson)
- 2021 – Jönköpings SS (Wilma Johansson, Moa Holmquist, Hanna Eriksson & Annie Hegmegi)
- 2022 – Jönköpings SS (Hanna Eriksson, Moa Holmquist, Wilma Johansson & Annie Hegmegi)

=== 4 × 50 metre medley relay ===
- 1994 – Helsingborgs S
- 1995 – Helsingborgs S/ref>
- 1996 – Helsingborgs S/ref>

=== 4 × 100 metre medley relay ===
- 1949 – SK Neptun
- 1950 – SK Neptun
- 1951 – SK Neptun
- 1952 – SK Neptun
- 1953 – SK Neptun
- 1954 – SK Neptun
- 1955 – SK Neptun
- 1956 – SK Neptun
- 1957 – SK Neptun
- 1958 – SK Neptun (Monica Öberg, Berit Piper, Birgitta Lundqvist & Bibbi Segerström)
- 1959 – SK Neptun (Monica Öberg, Margareta Winquist, Birgitta Lundqvist & Bibbi Segerström)
- 1960 – SK Ran (Nin Persson, Kristina Larsson, Karin Larsson & Barbro Andersson)
- 1961 – SK Neptun (Bibbi Segerström, Marianne Johansson, Karin Stenbäck & Jane Cederqvist)
- 1962 – SK Neptun (Lena Bengtsson, Majvor Welander, Karin Stenbäck & Ann-Christine Hagberg)
- 1963 – SK Neptun (Lena Bengtsson, Majvor Welander, Karin Stenbäck & Ann-Christine Hagberg)
- 1964 – SK Neptun
- 1965 – Upsala S
- 1966 – SK Neptun
- 1967 – Upsala S
- 1968 – Stockholmspolisens IF
- 1969 – Stockholmspolisens IF (Yvonne Hiljebäck, Anna-Lena Jönsson, Eva Wikner & Lena Isaksson)
- 1970 – Stockholmspolisens IF
- 1971 – Stockholmspolisens IF
- 1972 – Stockholmspolisens IF
- 1973 – Stockholmspolisens IF
- 1974 – Göteborgs KK Najaden
- 1975 – Göteborgs KK Najaden
- 1976 – Simavdelningen 1902
- 1977 – Simavdelningen 1902
- 1978 – Kristianstads SLS
- 1979 – Kristianstads SLS
- 1980 – Kristianstads SLS
- 1981 – Kristianstads SLS
- 1982 – Stockholmspolisens IF
- 1983 – Stockholmspolisens IF
- 1984 – Kristianstads SLS
- 1985 – Stockholmspolisens IF (Maja-Lena Deckner, Annelie Holmström, Armi Airaksinen & Marja Haglund)
- 1986 – Kristianstads SLS
- 1987 – Kristianstads SLS
- 1988 – Malmö KK
- 1989 – Kristianstads SLS
- 1990 – Kristianstads SLS
- 1991 – Helsingborgs S (Malin Gustavsson, Lotta Jabelin, Anna Lindberg & Annika Nilsson)
- 1992 – Malmö KK
- 1993 – Södertälje SS (Jetta Holm, Charlotte Humling, Anna-Karin Rantzow & Susanne Lööw) and Växjö SS
- 1994 – Spårvägens SF
- 1995 – Växjö SS
- 1996 – Helsingborgs S
- 1997 – Växjö SS (Camilla Johansson, Hanna Jaltner, Frida Johansson & Annica Winblad)
- 1998 – Växjö SS (Camilla Johansson, Hanna Jaltner, Emma Petersson & Kajsa Karlsson)
- 1999 – Trelleborgs SS (Camilla Johansson, Hanna Jaltner, Emma Pålsson & Sandra Steffensen)
- 2000 – SK Neptun (Therese Alshammar, Julia Russell, Destiny Laurén & Jessica Lidström)
- 2001 – Väsby SS (Malin Svahnström, Sara Nordenstam, Gabriella Fagundez & Josefin Lillhage)
- 2002 – Väsby SS (Malin Svahnström, Sara Nordenstam, Gabriella Fagundez & Josefin Lillhage)
- 2003 – Södertörns SS (Susannah Moonan, Maria Östling, Cathrin Carlzon & Louise Jöhncke)
- 2004 – Södertörns SS (Susannah Moonan, Maria Östling, Cathrin Carlzon & Cecilia Sjöholm)
- 2005 – Spårvägens SF (Natasha Sundin, Ida Nilsson, Johanna Sjöberg & Stina Gardell)
- 2006 – Spårvägens SF (Anna Åhlin, Ida Nilsson, Sofie Gardell & Johanna Sjöberg)
- 2007 – Göteborg Sim (Elin Harnebrandt, Joline Höglund, Isabelle Höglund & Claire Hedenskog)
- 2008 – SK Ran (Therese Svendsen, Una Finnman, Ida Marko-Varga & Gabriella Fagundez)
- 2009 – Täby Sim (Lovisa Ericsson, Rebecca Ejdervik, Therese Alshammar & Michelle Coleman)
- 2010 – Göteborg Sim (Johanna Pettersson, Joline Höstman, Isabelle Höstman & Claire Hedenskog)
- 2011 – Täby Sim (Michelle Coleman, Rebecca Ejdervik, Therese Alshammar & Lovisa Ericsson)
- 2012 – Täby Sim (Michelle Coleman, Rebecca Ejdervik, Therese Alshammar & Lovisa Ericsson)
- 2013 – Helsingborgs S (Sandra Hafström, Mari Louise Tran, My Fridell & Louise Hansson)
- 2014 – Spårvägens SF (Anna Åhlin, Jessica Billquist, Stina Gardell & Michelle Coleman)
- 2015 – Helsingborgs S (Sandra Hafström, Sophie Hansson, My Fridell & Louise Hansson)
- 2016 – Södertörns SS (Vilma Unnermark, Jessica Eriksson, Sarah Sjöström & Carin Klasson)
- 2017 – Helsingborgs S (Julia Stenhård, Sophie Hansson, Louise Hansson & Alicia Lundblad)
- 2018 – Helsingborgs S (Julia Stenhård, Sophie Hansson, Louise Hansson & Alicia Lundblad)
- 2019 – Helsingborgs S (Julia Stenhård, Sophie Hansson, Rebecca Hesslevik & Alicia Lundblad)
- 2021 – Jönköpings SS (Annie Hegmegi, Klara Thormalm, Hanna Eriksson & Alma Thormalm)
- 2022 – Västerås SS/Örebro SA (Magdalena Hagsten Skarda, Julia Månsson, Edith Jernstedt & Elvira Mörtstrand)

== Discontinued events ==
=== 400 metre breaststroke ===
- 1942 – Inga-Lill Hermansson (Stockholms KK)
- 1943 – Maj-Britt Jansson (Limhamns SS)
- 1944 – Kerstin Cassel (IFK Mora)
- 1945 – Marianne Fernlund (Stockholms KK)
- 1946 – Marianne Fernlund (Stockholms KK)
- 1947 – Marianne Fernlund (Stockholms KK)
- 1966 – Yvonne Brage (Skövde SS)

=== 3 × 100 metre medley relay ===
- 1945 – IFK Stockholm
- 1946 – Stockholms KK
- 1947 – Stockholms KK
- 1948 – IFK Stockholm

=== Lifesaving ===
- 1921 – Jane Gylling (SK Najaden)
- 1922 – Jane Gylling (SK Najaden)
- 1923 – Hjördis Töpel (SK Najaden)
- 1924 – Hjördis Töpel (SK Najaden)
- 1925 – Valborg Pettersson (Eskilstuna SS)
- 1926 – Ewa Olliwier (Stockholms KK)
- 1927 – May Eliasson (IFK Stockholm)
- 1928 – May Eliasson (IFK Stockholm)
- 1929 – May Eliasson (IFK Stockholm)
- 1930 – Ingrid Dott (Norrköpings KK)
- 1931 – Ingrid Dott (Norrköpings KK)
- 1932 – Ingrid Dott (Norrköpings KK)
- 1933 – Ingrid Dott (Norrköpings KK)
- 1934 – Ingrid Sjöstam (Örebro SS)
- 1935 – Kerstin Eriksson (Stockholms KK)
- 1936 – Marianne Berglund (Stockholms KK)
- 1937 – Marianne Berglund (Stockholms KK)
- 1938 – Marianne Berglund (Stockholms KK)
- 1939 – Gunnel Söderberg (IFK Stockholm)
- 1940 – Ingrid Wallin (IFK Stockholm)
- 1941 – Gunnel Söderberg (IFK Stockholm)
- 1942 – Gunnel Söderberg (IFK Stockholm)
- 1943 – Vera Dahlberg (IF Elfsborg)
- 1944 – Gunvor Nilsson (Hälsingborgs S)
- 1945 – Marianne Nilsson (Malmö S)
- 1946 – Marianne Nilsson (Malmö S)
- 1947 – Elisabeth Ahlgren (Linköpings ASS)
- 1948 – Elisabeth Ahlgren (Linköpings ASS)
- 1949 – Elisabeth Ahlgren (Linköpings ASS)
- 1950 – Marianne Fernlund (Stockholms KK)
- 1951 – Gunnel Ekström (Harnäs SS)
- 1952 – Gunnel Ekström (Harnäs SS)
- 1953 – Monica Peters (Limhamns SS)
- 1954 – Ruth Wester (SK Neptun)
- 1955 – Monica Peters (Limhamns SS)
- 1956 – Monica Peters (Limhamns SS)
- 1957 – Berit Piper (SK Neptun)
- 1958 – Anne-Christine Hessler (IK Attack)
- 1959 – Inger Thorngren (Upsala S)
- 1960 – Inger Thorngren (Upsala S)
- 1961 – Inger Thorngren (Upsala S)
- 1962 – Ulla Brännström (Bodens BK)
- 1963 – Inger Thorngren (Upsala S)
- 1964 – Inger Thorngren (Upsala S)
- 1965 – Marianne Lundquist (Gävle SS)
- 1966 – Agneta Thunell (Bromma SS)
- 1967 – Eva Schiller (Eskilstuna SS)
- 1968 – Katarina Ladersted (Göteborgs KK)

== Mixed relays ==
=== 4 × 100 metre freestyle relay ===
- 2022 – Jönköpings SS (Marcus Holmquist, Albin Lövgren, Klara Thormalm & Hanna Eriksson)

=== 4 × 100 metre medley relay ===
- 2022 – Helsingborgs S (Louise Hansson, August Mathisen, Victor Klingeryd Jalamo & Emilia Rönningdal)
