= 2010 FINA World Swimming Championships (25 m) – Women's 200 metre butterfly =

Women's 200m Butterfly at the 2010 Short Course Worlds
- Dates: 15 December 2010
- Competitors: 30
- Winning time: 2:03.59

Medalists
gold medal	Mireia Belmonte	Spain
silver medal	Jemma Lowe	Great Britain
bronze medal	Petra Granlund	Sweden

The Women's 200 Butterfly at the 10th FINA World Swimming Championships (25m) was swum on 15 December in Dubai, United Arab Emirates. 30 swimmers swam the preliminary heats, with the top-8 advancing to the final that evening.

== Records ==
Prior to the competition, the existing world and championship records were as follows.

	Name	Nation	Time	Location	Date
World record	Liu Zige	China	2:00.78	Berlin	15 November 2009
Championship record	Mary Mohler	United States	2:04.27	Manchester	9 April 2008

The following records were established during the competition:

Date	Round	Name	Nation	Time	WR	CR
15 December 2010	Final	Mireia Belmonte	Spain	2:03.59		CR

== Results ==
=== Heats ===
Rank	Heat	Lane	Name	Time	Notes
1	1	2	Katinka Hosszú (HUN)	2:04.56	Q
2	2	3	Mireia Belmonte (ESP)	2:04.84	Q
3	3	4	Jemma Lowe (GBR)	2:05.24	Q
4	2	4	Petra Granlund (SWE)	2:05.26	Q
5	4	4	Felicity Galvez (AUS)	2:05.41	Q
6	3	3	Audrey Lacroix (CAN)	2:05.68	Q
7	2	5	Alessia Polieri (ITA)	2:05.69	Q
8	1	7	Liu Zige (CHN)	2:06.18	Q
9	4	5	Martina Granström (SWE)	2:06.31	
10	4	3	Caterina Giacchetti (ITA)	2:06.77	
11	3	5	Kimberly Vandenberg (USA)	2:06.91	
12	3	6	Mary Mohler (USA)	2:07.01	
13	4	7	Hiroko Sugino (JPN)	2:07.81	
14	2	6	Martina van Berkel (SUI)	2:08.01	
15	3	2	Sara Oliveira (POR)	2:08.54	
16	4	6	Mandy Loots (RSA)	2:09.21	
17	1	6	Guo Fan (CHN)	2:09.64	
18	4	2	Katerine Savard (CAN)	2:09.98	
19	2	2	Emilia Pikkarainen (FIN)	2:10.77	
20	3	7	Jasmin Rosenberger (TUR)	2:12.49	
21	2	1	Meagan Lim (SIN)	2:14.10	
22	2	7	Patarawadee Kittiya (THA)	2:14.12	
23	4	1	Eliana Barrios (VEN)	2:15.22	
24	3	1	Diana Luna Sánchez (MEX)	2:15.66	
25	4	8	Oriele Alejandra Espinoza (PER)	2:18.65	
26	3	8	Sherazade Amanda Ramond (MAR)	2:25.21	
27	1	3	Tieri Erasito (FIJ)	2:27.84	
28	1	4	Shannon Austin (SEY)	2:31.86	
29	1	5	Debra Daniel (FSM)	3:07.76	
–	2	8	Davina Mangion (MLT)	DNS	

=== Final ===
Rank	Lane	Name	Time	Notes
1st place, gold medalist(s)	5	Mireia Belmonte (ESP)	2:03.59	CR
2nd place, silver medalist(s)	3	Jemma Lowe (GBR)	2:03.94	
3rd place, bronze medalist(s)	6	Petra Granlund (SWE)	2:04.38	
4	4	Katinka Hosszú (HUN)	2:04.68	
5	8	Liu Zige (CHN)	2:04.78	
6	2	Felicity Galvez (AUS)	2:04.98	
7	7	Audrey Lacroix (CAN)	2:06.52	
8	1	Alessia Polieri (ITA)	2:06.98	
