= Swimming at the 1958 European Aquatics Championships – Women's 100 metre freestyle =

The qualification rounds of the 1958 European Aquatics Championship women's 100 metre freestyle were held on 31 August 1958. 19 nations competed, and the final was on 1 September.

== Records ==
| | Name | Nationality | Result | Place | Date |
|---|---|---|---|---|---|
| World record | Dawn Fraser | (Australia) | 1:01.2 | Schiedam | 10 August 1958 |
| European record | Cornelia Gastelaars | (Netherlands) | 1:03.9 | Blackpool | 17 May 1958 |

A new record was set at the competition:

| Record of European Championship | qualification | (Netherlands) Cornelia Gastelaars | 1:04.7 | Budapest, Hungary | 31 August |
| Record of European Championship | final | (Sweden) Kate Jobson | 1:04,7 | Budapest, Hungary | 1 September |

== Results ==
=== Qualifications ===
| Position | Round | Name | Nationality | Result | Other |
|---|---|---|---|---|---|
| 1. | 2 | Cornelia Gastelaars | (Netherlands) | 1:04.7 | Q, ECR |
| 2 . | 4 | Kate Jobson | (Sweden) | 1:05.6 | Q |
| 3. | 3 | Ulvi Voog | Soviet Union | 1:06.2 | Q |
| 4. | 1 | Diana Wilkinson | (United Kingdom) | 1:06.4 | Q |
| 5. | 2 | Gerda Kraan | (Netherlands) | 1:06.4 | Q |
| 6. | 3 | Judith Grinham | (United Kingdom) | 1:06.6 | Q |
| 7. | 1 | Christel Steffin | (East Germany) | 1:07.2 | Q |
| 8. | 1 | Katalin Takács | (Hungary) | 1:07.5 | Q |
| 9. | 2 | Ursula Winkler | (Germany) | 1:07.7 | |
| 10. | 2 | Mária Frank | (Hungary) | 1:08.0 | |
| 11. | 4 | Karin Larsson | (Sweden) | 1:08.1 | |
| 12. | 4 | Hertha Haase | (Germany) | 1:08.6 | |
| 13. | 4 | Héda Frost | (France) | 1:08.6 | |
| 14. | 4 | Jutta Olbrisch | (East Germany) | 1:09.4 | |
| 15. | 3 | Alessandra Valle | (Italy) | 1:09.7 | |
| 16. | 1 | Nora Novotny | (Austria) | 1:10.5 | |
| 17. | 4 | Ginette Sendral | (France) | 1:11.4 | |
| 18. | 2 | Giovanna Martinelli | (Italy) | 1:11.7 | |
| 19. | 2 | Selma Hassan | (Turkey) | 1:22.1 | |

=== Final ===
| Position | Line | Nane | Nationality | Time | Other |
|---|---|---|---|---|---|
| Gold medal | 5 | Kate Jobson | (Sweden) | 1:04.7 | ECR |
| Silver medal | 4 | Cornelia Gastelaars | (Netherlands) | 1:05.0 | |
| Bronze medal | 7 | Judith Grinham | (United Kingdom) | 1:05.4 | |
| 4. | 6 | Gerda Kraan | (Netherlands) | 1:06.0 | |
| 5. | 2 | Diana Wilkinson | (United Kingdom) | 1:06.1 | |
| 6. | 1 | Christel Steffin | (East Germany) | 1:06.2 | |
| 7. | 3 | Ulvi Voog | (Soviet Union) | 1:06.4 | |
| 8. | 8 | Katalin Takács | (Hungary) | 1:07.8 | |

== Sources ==
- IX. úszó, műugró és vízilabda Európa-bajnokság. Magyar Úszó Szövetség. 1958.
