= Welander =

Welander is a surname of Swedish origin. Notable people with the surname include:

- Clinton Welander (born 1982), American audio engineer
- Lisa Welander (1909–2001), Swedish neurologist
- Majvor Welander (1950–2016), Swedish swimmer
- Marta Welander, British human rights activist
- Svea Nordblad Welander (1898–1985), Swedish composer
