= Swimming at the 2012 European Aquatics Championships – Women's 4 × 100 metre medley relay =

Women's 4 × 100 metre medley relay at the 2012 European Aquatics Championships
- Dates: May 27, 2012 (heats and final)
- Competitors: 60 from 13 nations
- Winning time: 3:58.43

Medalists
gold medal	Jenny Mensing; Sarah Poewe; Alexandra Wenk; Britta Steffen	Germany
silver medal	Arianna Barbieri; Ilaria Bianchi; Chiara Boggiatto; Alice Mizzau	Italy
bronze medal	Therese Svendsen; Joline Höstman; Martina Granström; Nathalie Lindborg	Sweden

The women's 4 × 100 metre medley relay competition of the swimming events at the 2012 European Aquatics Championships took place May 27. The heats and final took place on May 27.

== Records ==
Prior to the competition, the existing world, European and championship records were as follows.

	Nation	Time	Location	Date
World record	China	3:52.19	Rome	August 1, 2009
European record	Germany	3:55.79	Rome	August 1, 2009
Championship record	Great Britain	3:59.33	Eindhoven	March 24, 2008

== Results ==
=== Heats ===
15 nations participated in 2 heats.

Rank	Heat	Lane	Name	Nationality	Time	Notes
1	1	3	Carlotta Zofkova; Chiara Boggiatto; Silvia Di Pietro; Alice Mizzau	Italy	4:04.99	Q
2	1	1	Lisa Graf; Caroline Ruhnau; Sina Sutter; Daniela Schreiber	Germany	4:05.11	Q
3	1	6	Therese Svendsen; Joline Höstman; Martina Granström; Nathalie Lindborg	Sweden	4:06.00	Q
4	2	6	Mercedes Peris; Concepcion Badillo Diaz; Judit Ignacio Sorribes; Patricia Castro Ortega	Spain	4:06.13	Q
5	2	8	Eygló Ósk Gústafsdóttir; Hrafnhildur Lúthersdóttir; Sarah Blake Bateman; Eva Hannesdóttir	Iceland	4:07.33	Q
6	1	2	Hazal Sarikaya; Dilara Buse Günaydin; Ayse Ezgi Yazici; Burcu Dolunay	Turkey	4:08.63	Q
7	2	3	Anni Alitalo; Jenna Laukkanen; Emilia Pikkarainen; Hanna-Maria Seppälä	Finland	4:08.67	Q
8	2	2	Eszter Povázsay; Anna Sztankovics; Liliána Szilágyi; Evelyn Verrasztó	Hungary	4:09.10	Q
9	1	4	Uschi Halbreiner; Lisa Zaiser; Birgit Koschischek; Eva Chavez-Diaz	Austria	4:10.75	NR
10	2	5	Alicja Tchorz; Ewa Scieszko; Anna Dowgiert; Aleksandra Urbanczyk	Poland	4:11.36	
11	2	4	Kristina Krasyukova; Irina Novikova; Daria Tcvetkova; Maria Ugolkova	Russia	4:11.63	
12	1	7	Melanie Nocher; Fiona Doyle; Bethany Carson; Sycerika McMahon	Ireland	4:13.75	
	2	7	Veronica Orheim Bjørlykke; Katharina Stiberg; Ingvild Snildal; Henriette Brekke	Norway	DSQ	
	2	1		Greece	DNS	
	1	5		Czech Republic	DNS	

=== Final ===
The final was held at 18:02.

Rank	Lane	Name	Nationality	Time	Notes
1st place, gold medalist(s)	5	Jenny Mensing; Sarah Poewe; Alexandra Wenk; Britta Steffen	Germany	3:58.43	CR
2nd place, silver medalist(s)	4	Arianna Barbieri; Ilaria Bianchi; Chiara Boggiatto; Alice Mizzau	Italy	4:01.92	NR
3rd place, bronze medalist(s)	3	Therese Svendsen; Joline Höstman; Martina Granström; Nathalie Lindborg	Sweden	4:05.58	
4	2	Eygló Ósk Gústafsdóttir; Hrafnhildur Lúthersdóttir; Sarah Blake Bateman; Eva Hannesdóttir	Iceland	4:06.64	NR
5	6	Mercedes Peris; Concepcion Badillo Diaz; Judit Ignacio Sorribes; Patricia Castro Ortega	Spain	4:06.78	
6	8	Evelyn Verrasztó; Anna Sztankovics; Zsuzsanna Jakabos; Katinka Hosszú	Hungary	4:07.19	
7	1	Anni Alitalo; Jenna Laukkanen; Emilia Pikkarainen; Hanna-Maria Seppälä	Finland	4:07.55	NR
8	7	Hazal Sarikaya; Dilara Buse Günaydin; Ayse Ezgi Yazici; Burcu Dolunay	Turkey	4:07.56	NR
