= Linköpings =

Linköpings may refer to:

- Linköpings ASS, Linköpings Allmänna Simsällskap is a Swedish swim team
- Linköpings FC, an association football club
- Linköpings FF, premier men's football team
- Linköpings HC, Linköpings Hockey Club

== See also ==
- Linköping
