= Älvsborg =

Älvsborg or Elfsborg may refer to:

== Military ==
=== Fortresses ===
- Old Älvsborg, a ruined mediaeval castle on the Göta River in Gothenburg, Sweden
- New Älvsborg, a sea fort on the island of Kyrkogårdsholmen in Gothenburg, Sweden
- Älvsborg Fortress, a 19th-century fortress at the mouth of the Göta River
- Fort Nya Elfsborg, a 17th-century colonial fort on the Delaware River in modern New Jersey

=== Other military uses ===
- HSwMS Älvsborg, a minelayer of the Swedish Navy
- Älvsborg Regiment, a former infantry regiment based in Borås
- Älvsborg Coastal Artillery Regiment, a former regiment of the Swedish Coastal Artillery
- Älvsborg Brigade, a former infantry brigade in Sweden's Western Military District

== Sports ==
- Älvsborgs FF, a football club in Gothenburg
- IF Elfsborg, a professional football club based in Borås
- SK Elfsborg, a swimming club in Borås; see List of Swedish Swimming Championships champions (women)

== Other uses ==
- Älvsborg, Gothenburg, a borough of Gothenburg, Sweden
- Älvsborg County, a former county in Sweden
- Älvsborg Line, a railway line in Sweden
