= Therese Lundin =

Therese Lundin is the name of:

- Therese Lundin (footballer), Swedish footballer
- Therèse Lundin (swimmer), Swedish swimmer
