= Inger Andersson =

Swedish swimmer

Personal information
- Full name: Inger Elisabeth Andersson
- Nationality: Swedish
- Born: 8 June 1954 (age 72) Jönköping, Sweden

Sport
- Sport: Swimming
- Club: Jönköpings SLS

Inger Elisabeth Andersson (born 8 June 1954) is a Swedish former swimmer. She competed in the women's 100 metre freestyle at the 1972 Summer Olympics.

Andersson represented Jönköpings SLS.
