= Therese Svendsen =

Swedish swimmer representing SK Ran (born 1989)

Personal information
- Nationality: Sweden
- Born: 13 March 1989 (age 37) Malmö, Sweden

Sport
- Sport: Swimming
- Strokes: Backstroke
- Club: SK Ran
- College team: SMU Mustangs (USA) (2008-)
Medal record
European Championships (LC)
Bronze medal – third place	2012 Debrecen	4x100 m medley

Therese Svendsen (born Malmö, 13 March 1989) is a Swedish swimmer who represented SK Ran.

== Biography ==
She is a former holder of the Swedish record in short-course 200 m backstroke. She represented Sweden at the 2007 World Championships (backstroke events).

As of 2008, she is attended and competed for the USA's Southern Methodist University.

She competed in the 2012 Summer Olympics, where she finished 35th in the 100 metre backstroke event.
