= Marie Jacobsson =

Swedish synchronized swimmer

Personal information
- Full name: Marie Birgitta Jacobsson
- Nationality: Sweden
- Born: 26 October 1964 (age 61) Linköping, Sweden
- Height: 5 ft 7 in (170 cm)
- Weight: 58 kg (128 lb)

Sport
- Sport: Swimming
- Strokes: Synchronized swimming
- Club: Linköpings ASS
- Updated on 16 November 2014

Marie Jacobsson (born 26 October 1964) is a former synchronized swimmer from Sweden. She competed in the women's solo competition at the 1988 Summer Olympics.
