= Eva Berglund =

Swedish swimmer

- Born: 14 February 1984 (age 42)
- Known for: Competitive swimming

Eva Berglund (born 14 February 1984) is a Swedish swimmer from Jönköping, representing Jönköpings SS.

She has participated in some international championship in open water long distance events. She became the first Swedish swimmer competing in a European Championship in Open Water on 26 July 2006 in Lake Balaton, Hungary, during the 2006 European Championships in Aquatics. She finished 11th on the 5 km race. She took part in the 2007 World Championships (5 and 10 km) and the 2008 Olympic Games (10 km).

== Personal bests ==
=== Long course (50 m) ===
Event	Time	Date	Meet	Location	Ref
400 m freestyle	4:18.39	24 Apr 2009	French Championships	Montpellier, France	
800 m freestyle	8:47.59	24 Jun 2007	French Championships	Saint-Raphaël, France	
1500 m freestyle	16:49.28	5 Jul 2009	Swedish Championships	Linköping, Sweden	
400 m individual medley	4:47.82	23 Apr 2009	French Championships	Montpellier, France	

Legend: WR – World record; ER – European record; NR – Swedish record; e – equalled existing record;
Records not set in finals: h – heat; sf – semifinal; r – relay 1st leg; rh – relay heat 1st leg; b – B final; † – en route to final mark; so – swim-off; tt – time trial

=== Short course (25 m) ===
Event	Time	Date	Meet	Location	Ref
400 m freestyle	4:11.97	7 Dec 2008	French SC Championships	Angers, France	
800 m freestyle	8:34.23	7 Dec 2007	French SC Championships	Nîmes, France	
400 m individual medley	4:39.89	27 Nov 2008	Swedish SC Championships	Stockholm, Sweden	

Legend: WR – World record; ER – European record; NR – Swedish record; e – equalled existing record;
Records not set in finals: h – heat; sf – semifinal; r – relay 1st leg; rh – relay heat 1st leg; b – B final; † – en route to final mark; so – swim-off; tt – time trial

== Clubs ==
- Jönköpings SS
