= Malin Svahnström =

Swedish swimmer (born 1980)

Personal information
- Full name: Malin Erika Helena Svahnström
- Nationality: Sweden
- Born: 10 June 1980 (age 46) Upplands Väsby, Sweden
- Height: 1.69 m (5 ft 7 in)
- Weight: 60 kg (132 lb)

Sport
- Sport: Swimming
- Strokes: Freestyle
- Club: Väsby SS
Medal record
Women's swimming
Representing Sweden
Olympic Games
Bronze medal – third place	2000 Sydney	4×100 m freestyle
World Championships (SC)
Gold medal – first place	1999 Hong Kong	4×200 m freestyle
European Championships (LC)
Gold medal – first place	1999 Istanbul	4×100 m medley
Silver medal – second place	1997 Seville	4×100 m freestyle
Silver medal – second place	1997 Seville	4×200 m freestyle
Silver medal – second place	1999 Istanbul	4×100 m freestyle
Silver medal – second place	1999 Istanbul	4×200 m freestyle

Malin Svahnström (born 10 June 1980) is a Swedish Olympic swimmer currently representing Väsby SS. Svahnström participated in the 2000 Summer Olympics and the 2004 Summer Olympics, both times as a part of a relay team. In the 2000 event she swam the prelims in the 4×100 m freestyle relay, that later won a bronze medal. In Athens 2004 she was a part of the 4×200 m freestyle team along with Josefin Lillhage, Ida Mattsson and Lotta Wänberg that finished eighth in the finals.

== Clubs ==
- Väsby SS
