= Swimming at the 2012 European Aquatics Championships – Women's 200 metre butterfly =

Women's 200 metre butterfly at the 2012 European Aquatics Championships
- Dates: May 26, 2012 (heats and semifinals); May 27, 2012 (final)
- Competitors: 18 from 14 nations
- Winning time: 2:07.28

Medalists
gold medal	Katinka Hosszú	Hungary
silver medal	Zsuzsanna Jakabos	Hungary
bronze medal	Martina Granström	Sweden

The women's 200 metre butterfly competition of the swimming events at the 2012 European Aquatics Championships took place May 26 and 27. The heats and semifinals took place on May 26, the final on May 27.

== Records ==
Prior to the competition, the existing world, European and championship records were as follows.

	Name	Nation	Time	Location	Date
World record	Liu Zige	China	2:01.81	Ji Nan	October 21, 2009
European record	Katinka Hosszú	Hungary	2:04.27	Rome	July 29, 2009
Championship record	Otylia Jędrzejczak	Poland	2:05.78	Berlin	August 4, 2002

== Results ==
=== Heats ===
19 swimmers participated in 3 heats.

Rank	Heat	Lane	Name	Nationality	Time	Notes
1	1	4	Katinka Hosszú	Hungary	2:07.79	Q
2	2	4	Zsuzsanna Jakabos	Hungary	2:09.17	Q
3	2	5	Martina Granström	Sweden	2:10.35	Q
4	3	4	Mireia Belmonte García	Spain	2:11.10	Q
5	3	2	Denisa Smolenová	Slovakia	2:12.14	Q
6	1	6	Sara Freitas Oliveira	Portugal	2:12.23	Q
7	1	3	Franziska Hentke	Germany	2:12.65	Q
8	2	6	Liliána Szilágyi	Hungary	2:12.84	
9	2	2	Ingvild Snildal	Norway	2:13.09	Q, NR
10	3	3	Alessia Polieri	Italy	2:13.57	Q
11	2	3	Martina van Berkel	Switzerland	2:13.81	Q
12	1	2	Maria Novikova	Russia	2:15.23	Q
13	3	6	Emilia Pikkarainen	Finland	2:15.56	Q
14	3	5	Judit Ignacio Sorribes	Spain	2:15.61	Q
15	3	7	Jasmin Rosenberger	Turkey	2:17.01	Q
16	2	7	Simona Muccioli	San Marino	2:19.85	Q
17	1	7	Vaiva Gimbutytė	Lithuania	2:21.59	Q
18	3	1	Emilie Loevberg	Norway	2:29.22	
	1	5	Anja Klinar	Slovenia	DNS	

=== Semifinals ===
The eight fastert swimmers advanced to the final.

==== Semifinal 1 ====
Rank	Lane	Name	Nationality	Time	Notes
1	4	Zsuzsanna Jakabos	Hungary	2:09.09	Q
2	5	Mireia Belmonte García	Spain	2:09.14	Q
3	2	Martina van Berkel	Switzerland	2:11.31	Q
4	6	Ingvild Snildal	Norway	2:11.47	NR
5	3	Sara Freitas Oliveira	Portugal	2:11.98	
6	7	Emilia Pikkarainen	Finland	2:14.75	
7	1	Jasmin Rosenberger	Turkey	2:16.44	
8	8	Vaiva Gimbutytė	Lithuania	2:24.83	

==== Semifinal 2 ====
Rank	Lane	Name	Nationality	Time	Notes
1	4	Katinka Hosszú	Hungary	2:07.03	Q
2	5	Martina Granström	Sweden	2:08.65	Q
3	6	Franziska Hentke	Germany	2:09.40	Q
4	1	Judit Ignacio Sorribes	Spain	2:10.47	Q
5	3	Denisa Smolenová	Slovakia	2:11.08	Q, NR
6	2	Alessia Polieri	Italy	2:11.46	
7	7	Maria Novikova	Russia	2:16.42	
8	8	Simona Muccioli	San Marino	2:19.70	

=== Final ===
The final was held at 17:20.

Rank	Lane	Name	Nationality	Time	Notes
1st place, gold medalist(s)	4	Katinka Hosszú	Hungary	2:07.28	
2nd place, silver medalist(s)	3	Zsuzsanna Jakabos	Hungary	2:07.86	
3rd place, bronze medalist(s)	5	Martina Granström	Sweden	2:08.22	
4	6	Mireia Belmonte García	Spain	2:08.91	
5	2	Franziska Hentke	Germany	2:09.01	
6	7	Judit Ignacio Sorribes	Spain	2:09.14	
7	1	Denisa Smolenová	Slovakia	2:10.70	NR
8	8	Martina van Berkel	Switzerland	2:11.69	
