= Anna-Karin Persson =

Swedish swimmer

Personal information
- Born: April 14, 1973 (age 53)

Sport
- Sport: Swimming
- Club: Kungälvs SS

Anna-Karin Persson (born 14 April 1973) is a former Swedish Olympic swimmer. She competed in the 1988 Summer Olympics, where she swam the 4×100 meter medley relay.

== Clubs ==
- Kungälvs SS
