= Marta Welander =

British human rights advocate

- Education: PhD candidate and visiting lecturer in the Department of Politics and International Relations at University of Westminster
- Known for: Founder & Executive Director at Refugee Rights Europe

Marta Welander is an international human rights advocate and has dedicated the past decade to working for non-governmental organisations. For over five years, she served as the founding executive director for Refugee Rights Europe, where she and her team worked to secure the human rights of refugees and displaced people in Europe.

Before founding Refugee Rights Europe in 2016, Marta worked for a variety of human rights-focused organisations. In addition to volunteering for various organisations, she served as a trustee for Safe Passage International. Amnesty International has recognised Marta with two award nominations: the 2020 Brave Award and the 2018 Suffragette Award.

Marta is included as an Expert in the Brussels Binder, project aimed to bring more voices of women into European policy debates. She has written about asylum and migration, human rights, and humanitarian efforts for multiple online publications, and is a regular contributor to the Border Criminologies blog hosted by Oxford University. She was a visiting lecturer at the University of Westminster, where she earned her doctorate degree in 2021. She holds a MA in Democratic Governance, a MA in International Relations, and a BA in International Relations and Arabic.

Marta has a demonstrated history of success in non-government organization management and fundraising, but is particularly interested in research and human rights advocacy.
