= Gabriella Fagundez =

Swedish swimmer

Personal information
- Full name: Gabriella Fagundez
- Nationality: Sweden
- Born: 11 October 1985 (age 40) Landskrona, Sweden

Sport
- Sport: Swimming
- Strokes: Freestyle
- Club: SK Ran
Medal record
Women's swimming
Representing Sweden
European Championships (LC)
Silver medal – second place	2012 Debrecen	4×100 m freestyle
Bronze medal – third place	2004 Madrid	4×100 m freestyle
Bronze medal – third place	2010 Budapest	4×100 m freestyle

Gabriella Fagundez (born 11 October 1985) is a Swedish swimmer. She currently holds the 800 m (long course and short course) and 1500 m freestyle (long course) national records, and was part of the teams that holds the Swedish 4 × 100 m record (long course) and 4 × 200 m freestyle (short course).

== Personal bests ==
=== Long course (50 m) ===
Event	Time		Date	Meet	Location	Ref
100 m freestyle	54.98	(sf)	23 Apr 2009	French Championships	Montpellier, France	
200 m freestyle	1.57.99		8 June 2011	Mare Nostrum	Canet-en-Roussillon, France	
400 m freestyle	4:10.20	NR	24 Mar 2008	European LC Championships	Eindhoven, Netherlands	
800 m freestyle	8:39.06	NR (h)	14 Aug 2008	Olympic Games	Beijing, China	
1500 m freestyle	16:39.98	NR	26 Jul 2007	Swedish Championships	Halmstad, Sweden	
50 m butterfly	27.37		4 Apr 2004	Swedish Grand Prix	Stockholm, Sweden	
100 m butterfly	58.73		23 Apr 2009	French Championships	Montpellier, France	
200 m butterfly	2:13.23	(h)	14 Jun 2008	Meeting Arena	Canet-en-Roussillon, France	

Legend: WR – World record; ER – European record; NR – Swedish record;
Records not set in finals: h – heat; sf – semifinal; r – relay 1st leg; rh – relay heat 1st leg; b – B final; † – en route to final mark; so – swim-off; tt – time trial

=== Short course (25 m) ===
Event	Time		Date	Meet	Location	Ref
50 m freestyle	25.04	(r)	26 Nov 2009	Swedish SC Championships	Gothenburg, Sweden	
100 m freestyle	53.87	(r)	27 Nov 2009	Swedish SC Championships	Gothenburg, Sweden	
200 m freestyle	1:54.71	(h)	6 Dec 2008	French SC Championships	Angers, France	
400 m freestyle	4:03.27	NR (h)	12 Dec 2009	European SC Championships	Istanbul, Turkey	
800 m freestyle	8:19.28	NR	7 Dec 2007	French SC Championships	Nîmes, France	
50 m butterfly	26.88		14 Jan 2004	World Cup	Stockholm, Sweden	
100 m butterfly	59.04		16 Dec 2006	Interclubs	Montpellier, France	
200 m butterfly	2:09.40		13 Dec 2006	French SC Championships	Istres, France	

Legend: WR – World record; ER – European record; NR – Swedish record;
Records not set in finals: h – heat; sf – semifinal; r – relay 1st leg; rh – relay heat 1st leg; b – B final; † – en route to final mark; so – swim-off; tt – time trial
