= Anette Philipsson =

Swedish swimmer

Personal information
- Born: May 8, 1965 (age 61) Linköping, Östergötland, Sweden

Sport
- Sport: Swimming
- Strokes: Medley
- Club: Linköpings ASS

Sissy Anette ("Philip") Philipsson (born 8 May 1965) is a former Swedish Olympic medley swimmer. She competed in the 1984 Summer Olympics and the 1988 Summer Olympics. She finished 12th in the 200 m individual medley both times.

== Clubs ==
- Linköpings ASS
