= Yvonne Brage =

Swedish swimmer

Personal information
- Born: 8 July 1951 (age 75) Skövde, Sweden

Sport
- Sport: Swimming

Yvonne Brage (born 8 July 1951) is a Swedish former breaststroke swimmer. She competed in two events at the 1968 Summer Olympics.
