= Barbro Eriksson =

Swedish swimmer

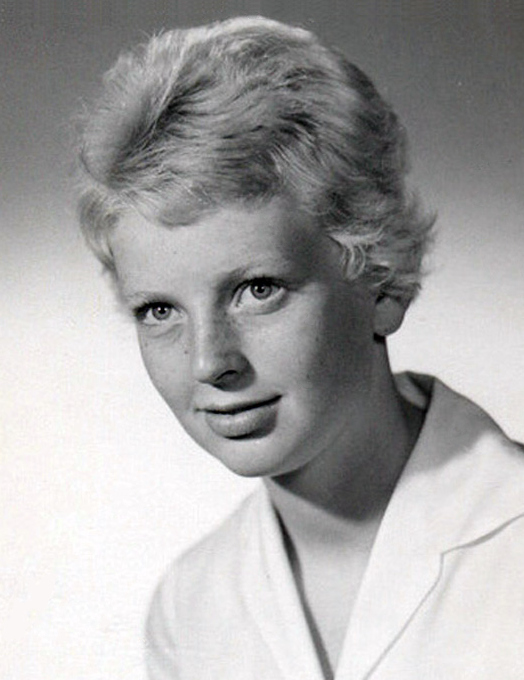

Personal information
- Born: 5 September 1943 (age 82) Oxelösund, Sweden
- Height: 174 cm (5 ft 9 in)
- Weight: 65 kg (143 lb)

Sport
- Sport: Swimming
- Strokes: Breaststroke
- Club: Nyköpings SS

Karin Barbro Elisabet Eriksson (later Flodström, born 5 September 1943) is a retired Swedish breaststroke swimmer. She competed at the 1960 Summer Olympics in the 200 m event but failed to reach the final.
