= Kerstin Isberg =

Swedish swimmer

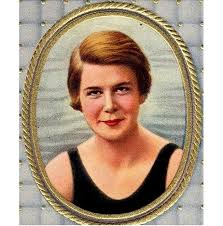

Personal information
- Born: 23 August 1913 Karlskrona, Sweden
- Died: 19 November 1984 (aged 71) Solna, Sweden

Sport
- Sport: Swimming

Kerstin Isberg (23 August 1913 – 19 November 1984) was a Swedish swimmer. She competed in the women's 200 metre breaststroke at the 1936 Summer Olympics.

Her father Paul Isberg was an Olympic gold medalist in Men's sailing.
