= Linköpings ASS =

Swedish swim team

Club information
- Full name: Linköpings Allmänna Simsällskap
- Short name: LASS
- City: Linköping
- Founded: 4 June 1824; 202 years ago as Linköpings SS
- Home pool(s): Linköpings simhall Tinnerbäcksbadet

Swimming
- Head coach: Vacant

Diving
- Founded: 1989

Water Polo
- Founded: 1974

Linköpings Allmänna Simsällskap, commonly known as Linköpings ASS or LASS, is a Swedish swimming club based in Linköping and founded on 4 June 1824. The founding date makes Linköpings ASS one of the oldest Swedish swim teams. The club is active in swimming and diving

== History ==
An initiative of Per Westman, Linköpings ASS was founded in 1824 as Linköpings Simsällskap. On 18 August 1824, the club organised their first swimming graduation ceremony (Swedish: simpromotion), where 9 bachelors and 20 masters graduated. In 1891, the club took its current name, Linköpings ASS.

Linköpings ASS had their first Olympic swimmer at the 1948 Summer Olympics, when Elisabeth Ahlgren participated. In 1988, Linköpings ASS had their first Olympics synchronized swimmer at the 1988 Summer Olympics, when Marie Jacobsson participated.

Led by coach Mikael Holmertz and swimmer Lars Frölander, Linköpings ASS was Sweden's best swimming club four years in a row from 2007 to 2010.

In 2009, the water polo team of Linköpings ASS left the swimming club and started Linköpings VF.

Bertil Wennberg became the swimming head coach in 2013. In August 2021, Rebecka Lester became swimming head coach of Linköpings ASS after Niklas Larsson. In 2022, Robin van Aggele, became swimming head coach of Linköpings ASS.

== Athletes ==
=== Swimmers ===
Swimmers that have participated in the Summer Olympics while representing Linköpings ASS:

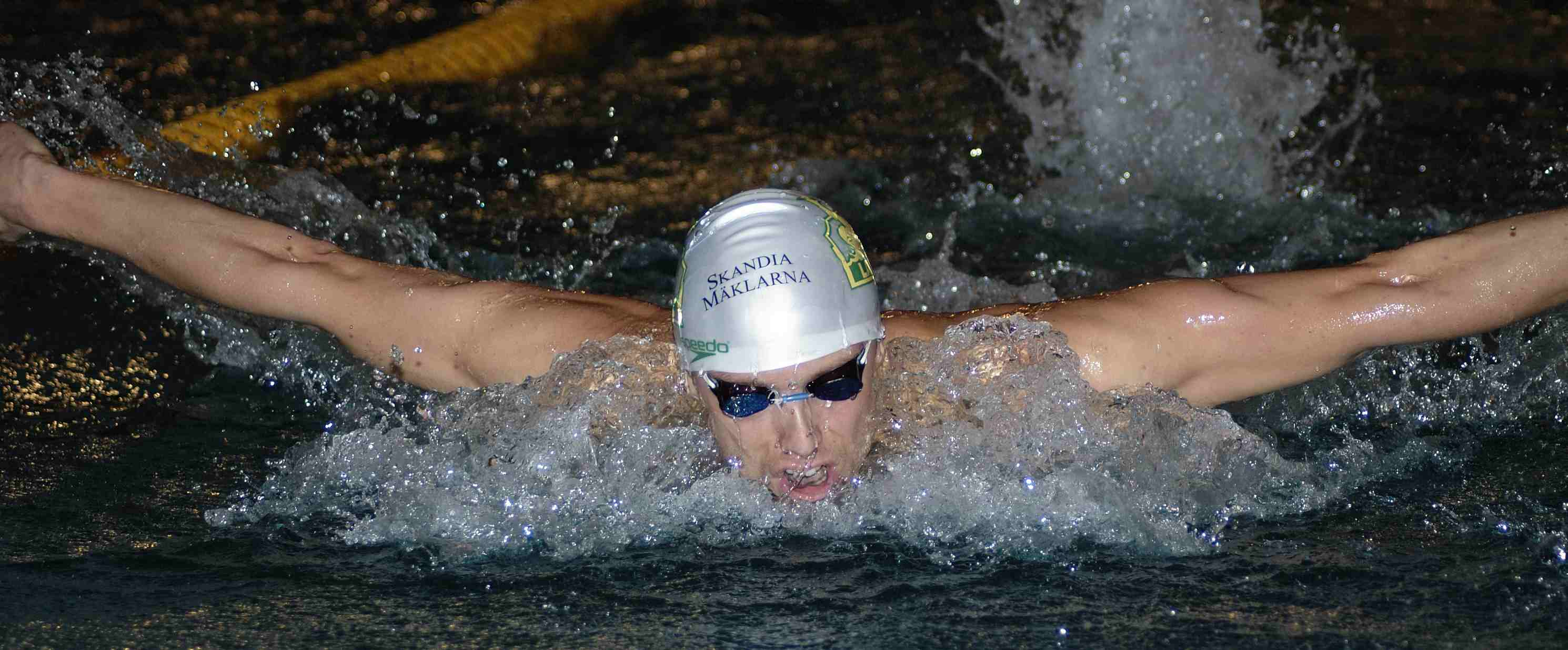
Lars Frölander at the 2006 Swedish Short Course Swimming Championships representing Linköpings ASS.

- Elisabeth Ahlgren
- Lotten Andersson
- Lars Frölander
- Anette Philipsson
- Åsa Sandlund

=== Synchronized swimmers ===
Synchronized swimmers that have participated in the Summer Olympics while representing Linköpings ASS:

- Marie Jacobsson
