= Joline Höstman =

Swedish swimmer (born 1988)

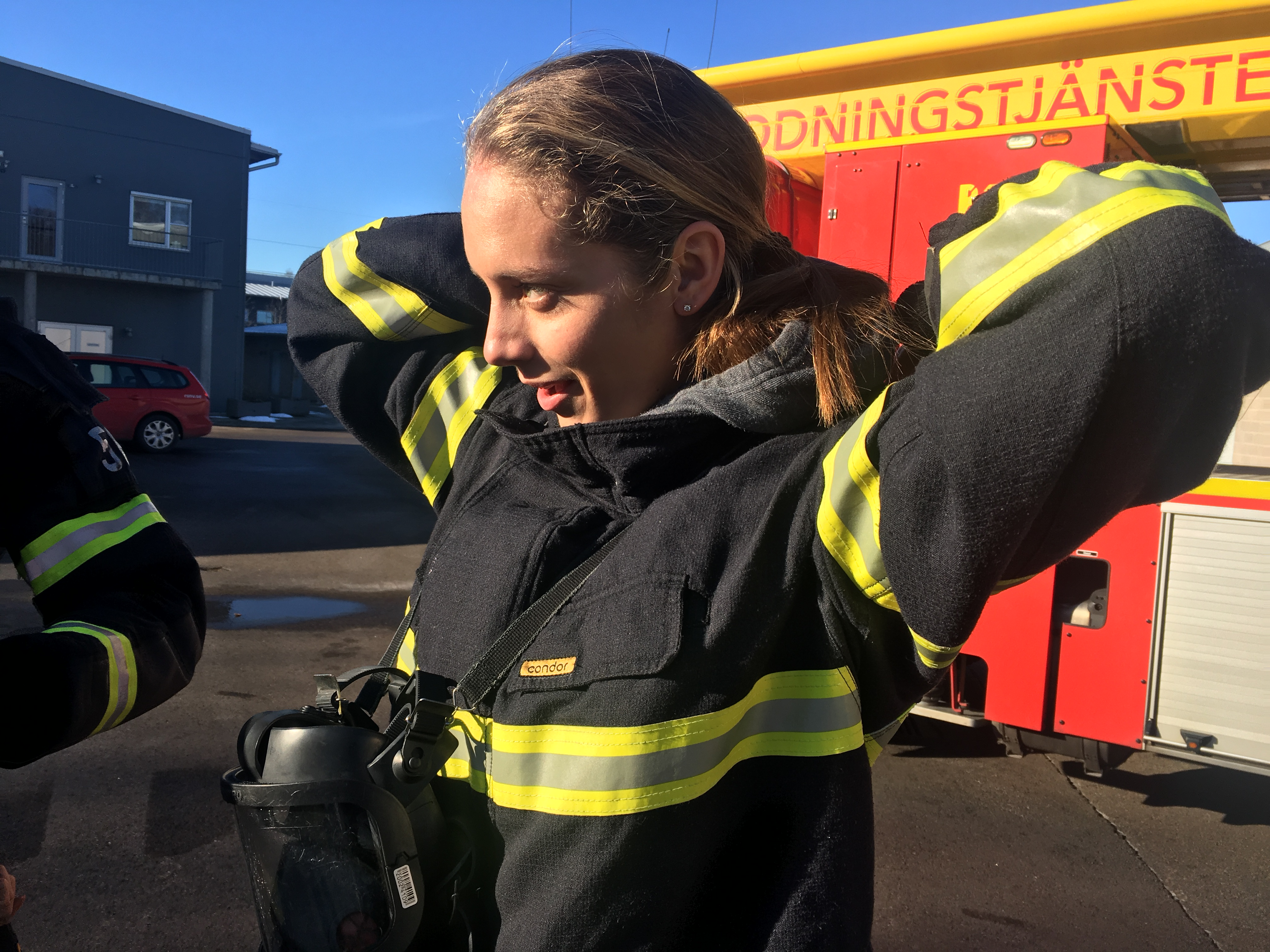

Personal information
- Full name: Carina Joline Höstman
- Nationality: Sweden
- Born: 24 September 1988 (age 37) Gothenburg, Sweden
- Height: 1.74 m (5 ft 9 in)
- Weight: 64 kg (141 lb)

Sport
- Sport: Swimming
- Strokes: Breaststroke
- Club: Göteborg Sim
Medal record
Women's swimming
Representing Sweden
European Championships (LC)
Silver medal – second place	2010 Budapest	4x100 m medley
Bronze medal – third place	2008 Eindhoven	100 m breaststroke
Bronze medal – third place	2012 Debrecen	4x100 m medley
European Championships (SC)
Bronze medal – third place	2009 Istanbul	200 m breaststroke

Joline Höstman (born 24 September 1988) is a Swedish swimmer from Gothenburg. She was born Höglund but changed her name in 2007 to her mother's maiden name.

== Personal bests ==
=== Long course (50 m) ===
Event	Time		Date	Meet	Location	Ref
100 m breaststroke	1:07.21	NR (sf)	27 Jul 2009	World Championships	Rome, Italy	
200 m breaststroke	2:22.24	NR (sf)	30 Jul 2009	World Championships	Rome, Italy	

Legend: WR – World record; ER – European record; NR – Swedish record;
Records not set in finals: h – heat; sf – semifinal; r – relay 1st leg; rh – relay heat 1st leg; b – B final; † – en route to final mark; so – swim-off; tt – time trial

=== Short course (25 m) ===
Event	Time		Date	Meet	Location	Ref
100 m breaststroke	1:05.27		4 Dec 2010	Stockholm, Sweden		
200 m breaststroke	2:19.28	NR	11 Dec 2009	European SC Championships	Istanbul, Turkey	

Legend: WR – World record; ER – European record; NR – Swedish record;
Records not set in finals: h – heat; sf – semifinal; r – relay 1st leg; rh – relay heat 1st leg; b – B final; † – en route to final mark; so – swim-off; tt – time trial

== Clubs ==
- Göteborg Sim
