= Ulla-Britt Eklund =

Swedish swimmer

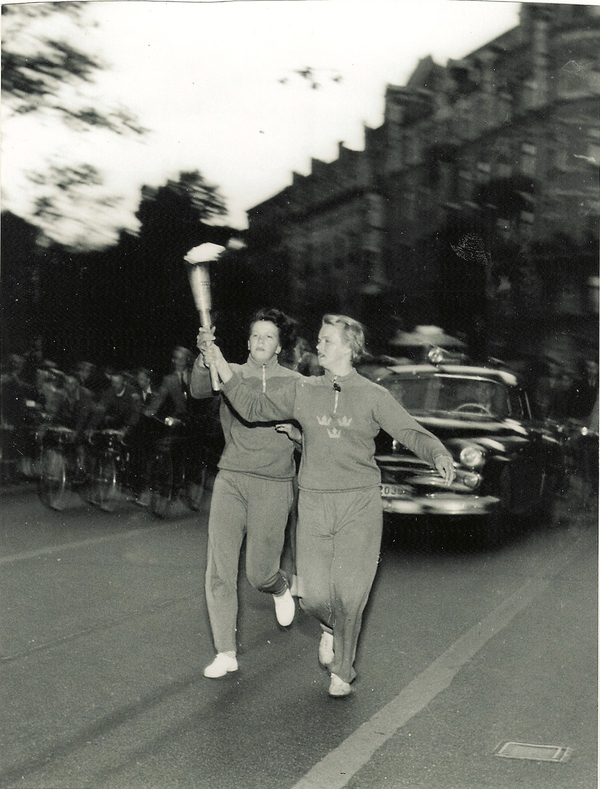
- Ulla-Britt Eklund (left) in 1952

Personal information
- Full name: Ulla-Britt Eklund
- Nationality: Swedish
- Born: 20 August 1934 (age 91) Stockholm, Sweden

Sport
- Sport: Swimming
- Club: SK Neptun

Ulla-Britt Eklund (born 20 August 1934) is a Swedish former swimmer. She competed in the women's 200 metre breaststroke at the 1952 Summer Olympics.

Eklund represented SK Neptun.
