= Gunilla Andersson (swimmer) =

Swedish swimmer

Personal information
- Born: 17 December 1955 (age 70) Stockholm, Sweden
- Height: 1.66 m (5 ft 5 in)
- Weight: 59 kg (130 lb)

Sport
- Sport: Swimming
- Club: SK Neptun, Stockholm
Medal record
Women's swimming
Representing Sweden
European Championships
Bronze medal – third place	1974 Vienna	4×100 m medley
Bronze medal – third place	1974 Vienna	100 m butterfly

Gunilla Elisabeth Andersson (born 17 December 1955) is a retired Swedish swimmer who won two bronze medals at the 1974 European Aquatics Championships. She also competed in three butterfly and medley relay events at the 1976 Summer Olympics, but was eliminated in the preliminaries.
