= Lotten Andersson =

Swedish swimmer (born 1950)

Personal information
- Born: 5 January 1950 (age 76) Borås, Sweden

Sport
- Sport: Swimming

Lotten Katrin Andersson (born 5 January 1950) is a Swedish former freestyle and butterfly swimmer. She competed at the 1964 Summer Olympics and the 1968 Summer Olympics.

Andersson represented Timrå AIF and Linköpings ASS.
