= Anita Zarnowiecki =

Swedish swimmer (born 1954)

Personal information
- Born: 26 May 1954 Gothenburg, Sweden
- Height: 1.62 m (5 ft 4 in)
- Weight: 52 kg (115 lb)

Sport
- Sport: Swimming
- Club: Simklubben S02, Göteborg
Medal record
Women's swimming
Representing Sweden
European Championships
Bronze medal – third place	1970 Barcelona	4×100 m freestyle

Anita Rosa Zarnowiecki (born 26 May 1954) is a Swedish freestyle and medley swimmer who won a bronze medal in the 4 × 100 m freestyle relay at the 1970 European Aquatics Championships. She competed at the 1972 Summer Olympics in four events and finished sixth and eighth in the 4 × 100 m freestyle and medley relays, respectively.

Being Jewish, she competed at the 1973 Maccabiah Games in Israel. At 19 years of age, she won seven gold medals, including the 100 m backstroke, the 400 m freestyle, and the 200 m individual medley, surpassing the record of five medals set by American swimmer Mark Spitz in 1969, and a silver medal in the 800 m freestyle.

Her twin brother, Bernt Zarnowiecki, also competed in freestyle swimming at the 1972 Summer Olympics, and in the 1973 Maccabiah Games.
