= Kristina Larsson =

Swedish swimmer

Personal information
- Full name: Birgit Kristina Larsson
- Nationality: Swedish
- Born: 14 January 1944 (age 82) Malmö, Skåne, Sweden
- Height: 1.68 m (5 ft 6 in)
- Weight: 61 kg (134 lb)

Sport
- Sport: Swimming
- Club: SK Ran

Birgit Kristina Larsson (born 14 January 1944) is a retired Swedish swimmer. She competed at the 1960 Summer Olympics in the 4 × 100 m freestyle relay and 100 butterfly and finished sixth and seventh, respectively.

Larsson retired from active swimming in 1964 to focus on her studies in Stockholm; she has a degree in pharmacy. However, in 1984 she returned to the pool and competed in the masters category until 1991. Her mother died in 1960, when Larsson was only 16 years old. In 1971 she married Per Björk. They have two children: Mikael (b. 1973) and Malin (b. 1978). Her elder sister, Karin, and younger brother, Gunnar are also former Olympic swimmers; Karin competed with the same 4 × 100 m freestyle team at the 1960 Olympics.
