= Eva Nyberg =

Swedish swimmer (born 1969)

Medal record

Women's Swimming

Representing Sweden

European Championships (LC)
Bronze medal – third place	1985 Sofia	4×200 m freestyle

Eva Karin Nyberg (born 8 February 1969 in Funbo, Uppsala) is a former Swedish Olympic freestyle swimmer. She competed in the 1988 Summer Olympics and in the 1992 Summer Olympics. Her best individual result is 19th place in the 100 m freestyle in 1992. She also swum a final with the 1992 4×100 m freestyle relay team finishing 7th.

Nyberg represented Mariestads SS and Malmö KK.
