= Jasmin Rosenberger =

German-Turkish swimmer

Personal information
- Nationality: Germany Turkey
- Born: October 16, 1985 (age 40) Traunstein, Germany

Sport
- Sport: Swimming
- Strokes: Butterfly
- Club: Fenerbahçe Swimming; SV Wacker Burghausen; Erster Münchner SC; SG Essen

Jasmin Rosenberger (Turkish: Yasemin Rosenberger; born October 16, 1985) is a Turkish female swimmer competing in the butterfly events. She is a member of Fenerbahçe Swimming in Istanbul. In Germany, she swims for SV Wacker Burghausen, Erster Münchner SC and SG Essen.

Her identical twin sister Iris is also a swimmer. The twins were born to German father Peter Rosenberger and Turkish mother Leyla Aktaş-Rosenberger, a painter, ceramic artist and sculptor, in Traunstein, Germany. They have a younger sister Deniz, who is also a swimmer. Jasmin studied law at LMU Munich.

Jasmin is the holder of Turkish national records of 200 m butterfly at short course with 2:10.60 set in 2009 and at long course with 2:14.26 set in 2012. She was the member of the Turkish team, which set a new national record at short course in 4×50 m medley relay with 1:53.48.

== Achievements ==
Year	Competition	Venue	Position	Event	Notes
Representing Turkey
2009	World Aquatics Championships	Rome, Italy	59th	100 m butterfly	1:02.52
2009	World Aquatics Championships	Rome, Italy	39th	200 m butterfly	2:16.24
2012	European Aquatics Championships	Debrecen, Hungary	33rd	100 m butterfly	1:02.83
2012	European Aquatics Championships	Debrecen, Hungary	14th SF	200 m butterfly	2:16.44

== See also ==
- Turkish women in sports
