= Elisabeth Ljunggren =

Swedish swimmer (born 1948)

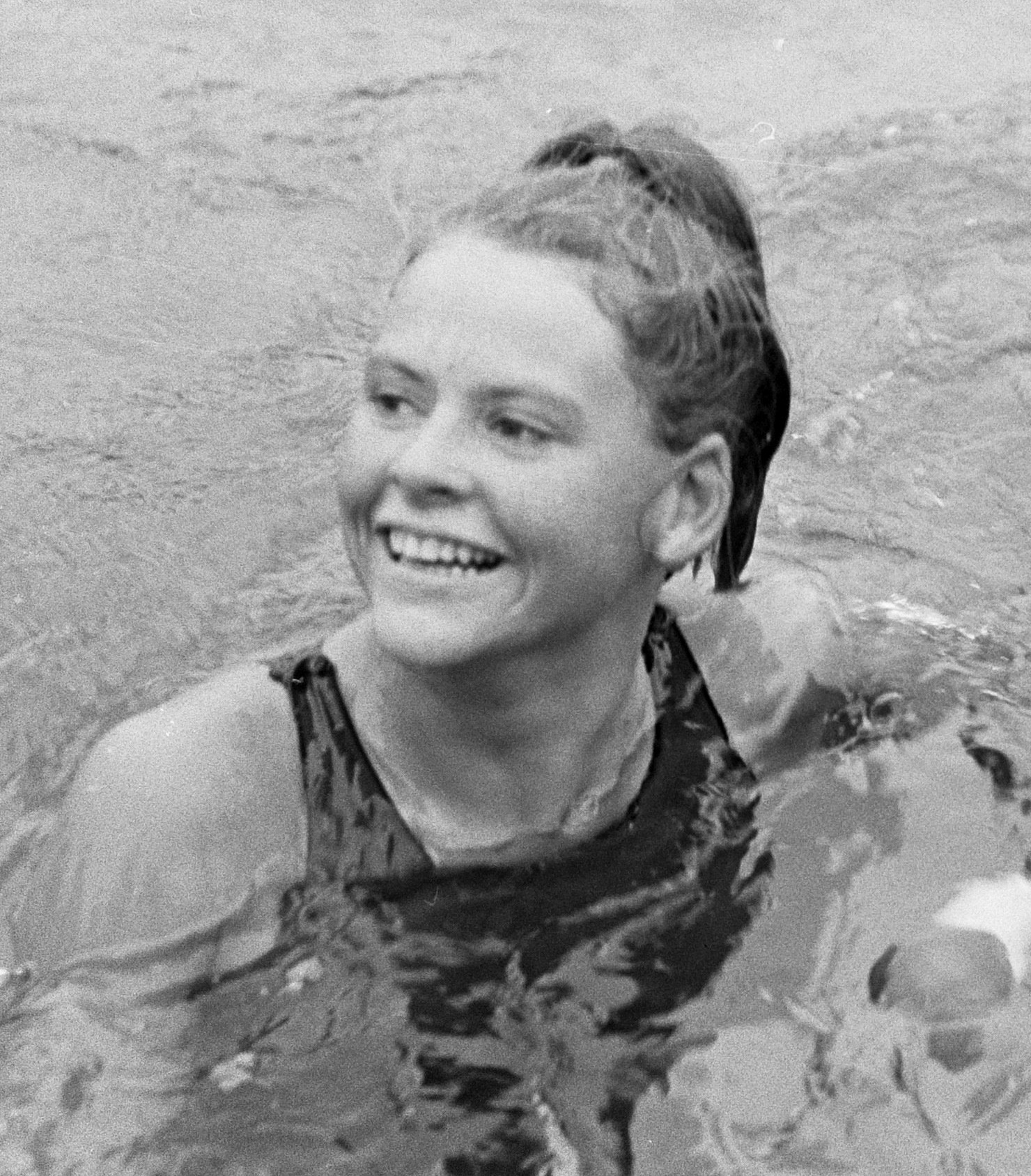
- Ljunggren in 1963

Personal information
- Born: 26 February 1948 (age 78) Stockholm, Sweden
- Height: 171 cm (5 ft 7 in)
- Weight: 58 kg (128 lb)

Sport
- Sport: Swimming
- Strokes: Freestyle
- Club: SK Neptun, Stockholm
Medal record
Representing Sweden
European Championships (LC)
Bronze medal – third place	1962 Leipzig	400 m freestyle

Elisabeth Ingrid Ljunggren-Morris (born 26 February 1948) is a retired Swedish freestyle swimmer won a bronze medal over 400 m at the 1962 European Aquatics Championships. She competed at the 1964 and 1968 Summer Olympics in the 400 m, 800 m and 4 × 100 m relay with the best achievement of eighth place over 400 m in 1968.
