= Anna-Karin Eriksson =

Swedish swimmer

Anna-Karin Lindqvist
Personal information
- Born: 16 April 1967 (age 59) Kalix, Sweden

Sport
- Sport: Swimming

Anna-Karin Lindqvist (formerly Eriksson) (born 16 April 1967) is a Swedish swimmer. She competed in two events at the 1984 Summer Olympics.
