= Ann Linder =

Swedish swimmer

Personal information
- Born: 9 June 1966 (age 60) Gothenburg, Sweden

Sport
- Sport: Swimming

Ann Linder (born 9 June 1966) is a Swedish former freestyle swimmer. She competed in three events at the 1984 Summer Olympics.
