= Åsa Sandlund =

Swedish swimmer

Åsa Karin Sandlund
Personal information
- Born: May 11, 1979 (age 45)

Sport
- Sport: Freestyle swimmer

Åsa Karin Sandlund (born 11 May 1979 in Linköping, Östergötland) is a former freestyle swimmer from Sweden, who competed for her native country at the 1996 Summer Olympics in Atlanta, Georgia. There she was a member of the women's 4×200 m freestyle relay team that ended up in ninth place, teaming up with Louise Jöhncke, Josefin Lillhage, and Johanna Sjöberg.

== Clubs ==
- Linköpings Allmänna SS
