= Inger Thorngren =

Swedish swimmer

Personal information
- Born: 7 July 1943 (age 83) Uppsala, Sweden

Sport
- Sport: Swimming

Inger Marianne Thorngren (born 7 July 1943) is a Swedish former freestyle swimmer. She competed in two events at the 1960 Summer Olympics.

Thorngren represented Upsala S.
