= Jönköpings SS =

Swedish swimming club

Club information
- Full name: Jönköpings Simsällskap
- Short name: JSS
- City: Jönköping
- Founded: 1829; 197 years ago
- Home pool: Rosenlundsbadet

Jönköpings Simsällskap, commonly known as Jönköpings SS, is a Swedish swimming club based in Jönköping, founded in 1829, and active in swimming, diving, synchronized swimming, and lifesaving. The founding date makes it one of the oldest in Sweden.

They practise in Rosenlundsbadet, venue for the 1977 European Aquatics Championships.

== History ==
On initiative of Lars Löwenadler, student of Jöns Svanberg, Jönköpings SS was founded in 1829 and organised their first swimming graduation ceremony (Swedish: simpromotion) the same year. Between 1921 and 1971, the name of the club was Jönköpings Sim- och Livräddningssällskap (JSLS).

Jönköpings SS had their first Olympic swimmer at the 1972 Summer Olympics, when Inger Andersson participated.

== Swimmers ==
Swimmers that have participated in the Summer Olympics while representing Jönköpings SS:

- Inger Andersson
- Martina Granström
- Victor Johansson
