= Kate Jobson =

Swedish swimmer

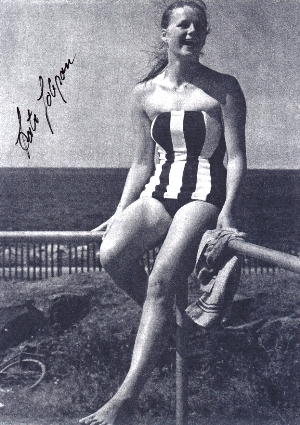

Personal information
- Born: 8 July 1937 (age 89) Varberg, Sweden

Sport
- Sport: Swimming
- Strokes: Freestyle
- Club: Varbergs GIF
Medal record
Representing Sweden
European Championships
Gold medal – first place	1958 Budapest	100 m freestyle
Bronze medal – third place	1958 Budapest	4×100 m freestyle

Kate Margareth Jobson (later Davies; born 8 July 1937) is a retired Swedish freestyle swimmer who won the 1958 European title in the 100 m event. The same year she received a Swedish sportswoman of the year award (Årets idrottskvinna). She competed at the 1956 Summer Olympics in the 100 m and 4 × 100 m events and finished sixth in the relay.
