= Elisabeth Ahlgren =

Swedish swimmer

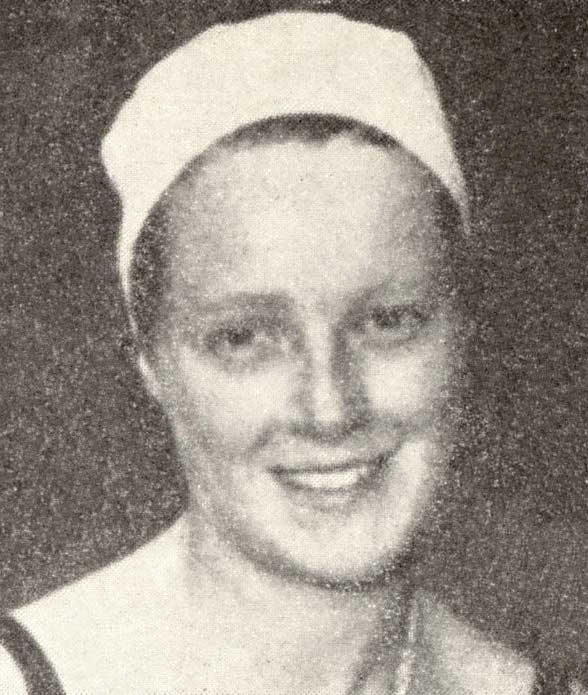

Personal information
- Born: 27 May 1925 Linköping, Sweden
- Died: 27 April 2010 (aged 84) Lund, Sweden

Sport
- Sport: Swimming
- Club: Linköpings ASS
Medal record
Representing Sweden
European Championships
Bronze medal – third place	1950 Vienna	4×100 m freestyle

Elisabeth Ulla Johanna Åkesdotter Ahlgren (later Borglin, 27 May 1925 – 27 April 2010) was a Swedish swimmer who won a bronze medal in the 4 × 100 m freestyle relay at the 1950 European Aquatics Championships. Her team was disqualified in the same event at the 1948 Summer Olympics; at those games she also competed individually and finished seventh in the 100 m freestyle.
