= Karin Larsson (swimmer) =

Swedish swimmer (1941–2019)

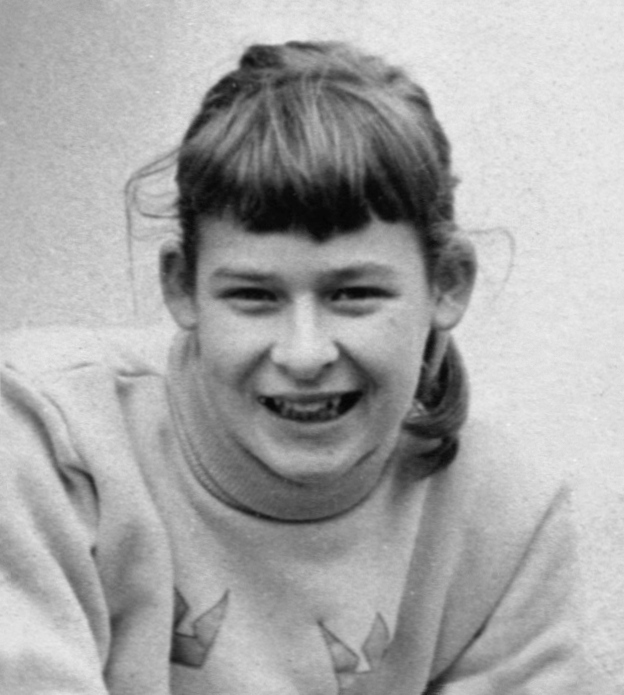

Personal information
- Full name: Anna Karin Larsson
- Nationality: Swedish
- Born: 30 August 1941 Malmö, Skåne, Sweden
- Died: 21 September 2019 (aged 78)
- Height: 1.70 m (5 ft 7 in)
- Weight: 64 kg (141 lb)

Sport
- Sport: Swimming
- Club: SK Ran
Medal record
Representing Sweden
European Championships
Bronze medal – third place	1958 Budapest	4×100 m freestyle
Summer Universiade
Gold medal – first place	1961 Sofia	100m freestyle
Silver medal – second place	1961 Sofia	100m butterfly

Anna Karin Larsson (later Ahlström, 30 August 1941 – 21 September 2019) was a Swedish swimmer who won a bronze medal at the 1958 European Aquatics Championships in the 4×100 m freestyle relay. She competed in the same event at the 1956 and 1960 Summer Olympics and finished sixth in both games. Individually, she was eliminated in the preliminaries of the 100 m and 400 m freestyle.

Larsson retired from active swimming in 1962 to focus on her studies; she graduated in physiotherapy from Lund University. However, she later returned to the pool and competed for a few years in the masters category. She also worked as a swimming coach and as instructor with disabled persons. She had three children: Peter Ahlström (b. 1965), Mats Ahlström (b. 1967) and Katarina Ahlström (b. 1970). Her mother died when Larsson was 19 years old. Her younger sister, Kristina, and brother, Gunnar are also former Olympic swimmers; Kristina competed with the same 4×100 m freestyle team at the 1960 Olympics.
