= Majvor Welander =

Swedish swimmer

Personal information
- Full name: Majvor Maria Catharina Welander
- Born: 15 February 1950 Stockholm, Sweden
- Died: January 2016 (aged 65)

Sport
- Sport: Swimming

Majvor Maria Catharina Welander (15 February 1950 – January 2016) was a Swedish swimmer. She competed in the women's 400 metre freestyle at the 1964 Summer Olympics.

Welander represented SK Neptun.
