= SK Ran =

Swedish swimming club

Club information
- Full name: Simklubben Ran
- City: Malmö
- Founded: 1 September 1922; 104 years ago
- Home pool: Segevångsbadet

Simklubben Ran, commonly known as SK Ran, is a Swedish swimming club from Malmö, Sweden, founded on 1 September 1922, and competing in swimming and water polo. The club resides at Segevångsbadet.

Swedish two-times Olympic gold medalist Gunnar Larsson has swum for SK Ran.

== History ==
SK Ran was founded at Ribersborgs open-air bath by Ivan Lundquist and 50 others with the aim to compete with Malmö SS. In 1931, SK Ran had their first competitor at the Swedish Swimming Championships; it was Gulli Andersson who took a silver medal on 100 metre backstroke and a bronze medal on 100 metre freestyle.

SK Ran had their first Olympic swimmer at the 1956 Summer Olympics, when Karin Larsson participated.

== Swimmers ==
Swimmers that have participated in the Summer Olympics while representing SK Ran:

- Rudi Dollmayer
- Gabriella Fagundez
- Karin Larsson
- Kristina Larsson
- Ida Marko-Varga
