= Therèse Lundin (swimmer) =

Swedish swimmer

Medal record

Women's swimming

Representing Sweden

European Championships (LC)
Silver medal – second place	1993 Sheffield	4x200 m freestyle
Bronze medal – third place	1991 Athens	100 m butterfly

Therèse Sofie Lundin (born 2 August 1970) is a former Swedish Olympic butterfly and freestyle swimmer. She competed in the 1992 Summer Olympics, where she finished 12th in the 100 m butterfly with a time of 1:01.38.

Born in Uddevalla, Lundin represented Simavdelningen 1902 of Gothenburg.
