= Lotta Wänberg =

Swedish swimmer

Personal information
- Born: February 18, 1979 (age 47)

Sport
- Sport: Swimming

Lotta Wänberg (born 18 February 1979) is a Swedish former Olympic freestyle swimmer. She competed in the 2004 Summer Olympics, where she swam a leg in the 4×200 m freestyle relay team that finished eighth.

== Clubs ==
- Malmö KK
