= Martina Granström =

Swedish swimmer

Personal information
- Full name: Anna Martina Granström
- Born: 5 August 1991 (age 34) Uppsala, Sweden

Sport
- Sport: Swimming
- Club: Jönköpings SS
Medal record
Women's swimming
Representing Sweden
European Aquatics Championships
Silver medal – second place	2012 Debrecen	100 metre butterfly
Bronze medal – third place	2012 Debrecen	200 metre butterfly

Anna Martina Granström (born 5 August 1991) is a Swedish butterfly swimmer. At the 2012 Summer Olympics she finished 14th overall in the heats in the women's 100-metre butterfly and qualified for the semi-final. She also competed in the women's 200 metre butterfly and the 4 × 100 m medley relay team.

Granström represents Jönköpings SS.
