= List of Swedish Short Course Swimming Championships champions (men) =

This is a list of men's champions of the Swedish Short Course Swimming Championships, the annual swimming championship in short course, usually held indoors in the Swedish winter. Records go back to 1953 in freestyle, backstroke, breaststroke, butterfly, and various relays and medley competitions.

== Current program ==
=== 50 metre freestyle ===
- 1953 – Göran Larsson (Stockholms KK)
- 1954 – Göran Larsson (Stockholms KK)
- 1955 – Göran Larsson (Simavdelningen 1902)
- 1956 – Göran Larsson (Simavdelningen 1902)
- 1957 – Göran Larsson (Simavdelningen 1902)
- 1986 – Nils Liedberg (Karlstads SS)
- 1987 – Göran Titus (Örebro Simallians)
- 1988 – Per Johansson (Borlänge SS)
- 1989 – Joakim Holmqvist (Jönköpings SS)
- 1990 – Lars-Ove Jansson (Upsala S)
- 1991 – Lars-Ove Jansson (Upsala S)
- 1992 – Joakim Holmqvist (Jönköpings SS)
- 1993 – Joakim Holmqvist (Jönköpings SS)
- 1994 – Joakim Holmqvist (Jönköpings SS)
- 1995 – Fredrik Letzler (Spårvägens SF)
- 1996 – Joakim Holmqvist (Jönköpings SS)
- 1997 – Jonas Åkesson (Spårvägens SF)
- 1998 – John Miranda (Stockholms KK)
- 1999 – John Miranda (Södertälje SS)
- 2000 – John Miranda (Södertälje SS)
- 2001 – Stefan Nystrand (Södertörns SS)
- 2002 – Stefan Nystrand (Södertörns SS)
- 2003 – Stefan Nystrand (Södertörns SS)
- 2004 – Stefan Nystrand (Södertörns SS)
- 2005 – Marcus Piehl (Linköpings ASS)
- 2006 – Stefan Nystrand (SK Neptun)
- 2007 – Petter Stymne (SK Neptun)
- 2008 – Marcus Piehl (Linköpings ASS)
- 2009 – Petter Stymne (SK Neptun)
- 2010 – Stefan Nystrand (SK Neptun)
- 2011 – Stefan Nystrand (Spårvägens SF)
- 2012 – Stefan Nystrand (Spårvägens SF)
- 2013 – Petter Stymne (SK Neptun)
- 2014 – Christoffer Carlsen (Mölndals ASS)
- 2015 – Christoffer Carlsen (Helsingborgs S)
- 2016 – Christoffer Carlsen (Helsingborgs S)
- 2017 – Björn Seeliger (Södertälje SS)
- 2018 – Björn Seeliger (Södertälje SS)
- 2019 – Björn Seeliger (Stockholms KK)
- 2021 – Isak Eliasson (Spårvägens SF)
- 2022 – Elias Persson (Malmö KK)

=== 100 metre freestyle ===
- 1972 – Gunnar Larsson (Malmö S)
- 1973 – Gunnar Larsson (Malmö S)
- 1974 – Bernt Zarnowiecki (Falu SS)
- 1975 – Bernt Zarnowiecki (Falu SS)
- 1976 – Dan Larsson (Sundsvalls SS)
- 1977 – Dan Larsson (Sundsvalls SS)
- 1978 – Dan Larsson (Sundsvalls SS)
- 1979 – Per Holmertz (Motala SS)
- 1980 – Per Wikström (Borlänge SS)
- 1981 – Per Holmertz (Stockholmspolisens IF)
- 1982 – Per Holmertz (Stockholmspolisens IF)
- 1983 – Per Holmertz (Stockholmspolisens IF)
- 1984 – Thomas Lejdström (Västerås SS)
- 1985 – Tommy Werner (Karlskrona SS)
- 1986 – Tommy Werner (Karlskrona SS)
- 1987 – Tommy Werner (Karlskrona SS)
- 1988 – Tommy Werner (Karlskrona SS)
- 1989 – Tommy Werner (Karlskrona SS)
- 1990 – Tommy Werner (Karlskrona SS)
- 1991 – Joakim Holmqvist (Jönköpings SS)
- 1992 – Tommy Werner (Karlskrona SS)
- 1993 – Anders Holmertz (Spårvägens SF)
- 1994 – Anders Holmertz (Spårvägens SF)
- 1995 – Fredrik Letzler (Spårvägens SF)
- 1996 – Anders Holmertz (Spårvägens SF)
- 1997 – Anders Holmertz (Spårvägens SF)
- 1998 – Johan Wallberg (SK Neptun)
- 1999 – Lars Frölander (Sundsvalls SS)
- 2000 – Lars Frölander (Sundsvalls SS)
- 2001 – Stefan Nystrand (Södertörns SS)
- 2002 – Lars Frölander (Linköpings ASS)
- 2003 – Stefan Nystrand (Södertörns SS)
- 2004 – Stefan Nystrand (Södertörns SS)
- 2005 – Marcus Piehl (Linköpings ASS)
- 2006 – Jonas Tilly (Trelleborgs SS)
- 2007 – Petter Stymne (SK Neptun)
- 2008 – Corentin Poels (Göteborg Sim)
- 2009 – Jonas Persson (Malmö KK)
- 2010 – Petter Stymne (SK Neptun)
- 2011 – Petter Stymne (SK Neptun)
- 2012 – Oscar Ekström (Linköpings ASS)
- 2013 – Christoffer Carlsen (Mölndals ASS)
- 2014 – Christoffer Carlsen (Mölndals ASS)
- 2015 – Christoffer Carlsen (Helsingborgs S)
- 2016 – Christoffer Carlsen (Helsingborgs S)
- 2017 – Christoffer Carlsen (Helsingborgs S)
- 2018 – Christoffer Carlsen (Helsingborgs S)
- 2019 – Christoffer Carlsen (Helsingborgs S)
- 2021 – Isak Eliasson (Spårvägens SF)
- 2022 – Isak Eliasson (Spårvägens SF)

=== 200 metre freestyle ===
- 1959 – Bengt Nordvall (SK Neptun)
- 1960 – Bengt Nordvall (SK Neptun)
- 1961 – Lars-Erik Bengtsson (SK Neptun)
- 1962 – Mats Svensson (IF Elfsborg)
- 1963 – Jan Lundin (Stockholmspolisens IF)
- 1964 – Jan Lundin (Stockholmspolisens IF)
- 1965 – Jan Lundin (Stockholmspolisens IF)
- 1966 – Lester Eriksson (SK Neptun)
- 1967 – Lester Eriksson (SK Neptun)
- 1968 – Lester Eriksson (SK Neptun)
- 1969 – Gunnar Larsson (Malmö S)
- 1970 – Göran Jansson (Stockholmspolisens IF)
- 1971 – Hans Ljungberg (Timrå SK)
- 1976 – Dan Larsson (Sundsvalls SS)
- 1977 – Pär Arvidsson (Finspångs SK)
- 1978 – Gary Andersson (Kristianstads SLS)
- 1979 – Per Holmertz (Motala SS)
- 1980 – Thomas Lejdström (Västerås SS)
- 1981 – Per Holmertz (Stockholmspolisens IF)
- 1982 – Per Holmertz (Stockholmspolisens IF)
- 1983 – Thomas Lejdström (Västerås SS)
- 1984 – Michael Söderlund (Karlskrona SS)
- 1985 – Tommy Werner (Karlskrona SS)
- 1986 – Tommy Werner (Karlskrona SS)
- 1987 – Tommy Werner (Karlskrona SS)
- 1988 – Anders Holmertz (Motala SS)
- 1989 – Anders Holmertz (Motala SS)
- 1990 – Anders Holmertz (Motala SS)
- 1991 – Anders Holmertz (Spårvägens SF)
- 1992 – Anders Holmertz (Spårvägens SF)
- 1993 – Anders Holmertz (Spårvägens SF)
- 1994 – Anders Holmertz (Spårvägens SF)
- 1995 – Anders Holmertz (Spårvägens SF)
- 1996 – Anders Holmertz (Spårvägens SF)
- 1997 – Anders Lyrbring (Simavdelningen 1902)
- 1998 – Johan Wallberg (SK Neptun)
- 1999 – Anders Lyrbring (Mölndals ASS)
- 2000 – Johan Wallberg (SK Neptun)
- 2001 – Erik Pönni (Jönköpings SS)
- 2002 – Jesper Levander (Södertörns SS)
- 2003 – Lars Frölander (Linköpings ASS)
- 2004 – Mattias Ohlin (Trelleborgs SS)
- 2005 – Erik Andersson (Göteborg Sim)
- 2006 – Jonas Persson (Malmö KK)
- 2007 – Christoffer Vikström (Upsala S)
- 2008 – Radovan Siljevski (SK Neptun)
- 2009 – Mattias Carlsson (Uddevalla Sim)
- 2010 – Robin Andréasson (Mölndals ASS)
- 2011 – Oscar Ekström (Linköpings ASS)
- 2012 – Oscar Ekström (Linköpings ASS)
- 2013 – Mattias Carlsson (Uddevalla Sim)
- 2014 – Oscar Ekström (Linköpings ASS)
- 2015 – Christoffer Carlsen (Helsingborgs S)
- 2016 – Adam Paulsson (SK Elfsborg)
- 2017 – Christoffer Carlsen (Helsingborgs S)
- 2018 – Robin Hanson (Järfälla Sim)
- 2019 – Robin Hanson (Spårvägens SF)
- 2021 – Isak Eliasson (Spårvägens SF)
- 2022 – Isak Eliasson (Spårvägens SF)

=== 400 metre freestyle ===
- 1972 – Gunnar Larsson (Malmö S)
- 1973 – Anders Bellbring (Limhamns SS)
- 1974 – Bengt Gingsjö (Simavdelningen 1902)
- 1975 – Peter Pettersson (SK Laxen)
- 1976 – Peter Pettersson (SK Laxen)
- 1977 – Gary Andersson (Kristianstads SLS)
- 1978 – Gary Andersson (Kristianstads SLS)
- 1979 – Thomas Lejdström (Västerås SS)
- 1980 – Thomas Lejdström (Västerås SS)
- 1981 – Thomas Lejdström (Västerås SS)
- 1982 – Thomas Lejdström (Västerås SS)
- 1983 – Thomas Lejdström (Västerås SS)
- 1984 – Anders Holmertz (Motala SS)
- 1985 – Anders Holmertz (Motala SS)
- 1986 – Anders Holmertz (Motala SS)
- 1987 – Anders Holmertz (Motala SS)
- 1988 – Anders Holmertz (Motala SS)
- 1989 – Anders Holmertz (Motala SS)
- 1990 – Anders Holmertz (Motala SS)
- 1991 – Anders Holmertz (Spårvägens SF)
- 1992 – Anders Holmertz (Spårvägens SF)
- 1993 – Anders Holmertz (Spårvägens SF)
- 1994 – Anders Holmertz (Spårvägens SF)
- 1995 – Anders Holmertz (Spårvägens SF)
- 1996 – Anders Holmertz (Spårvägens SF)
- 1997 – Anders Holmertz (Spårvägens SF)
- 1998 – Jonas Lundström (Sundsvalls SS)
- 1999 – Petter Lindh (Jönköpings SS)
- 2000 – Mikael E. Rosén (Sundsvalls SS)
- 2001 – Erik Pönni (Jönköpings SS)
- 2002 – Jesper Levander (Södertörns SS)
- 2003 – Peter Edvardsson (SK Neptun)
- 2004 – Peter Edvardsson (SK Neptun)
- 2005 – Peter Edvardsson (SK Neptun)
- 2006 – Johan Claar (Jönköpings SS)
- 2007 – Johan Claar (Jönköpings SS)
- 2008 – Simon Sjödin (SK Neptun)
- 2009 – Mattias Carlsson (Uddevalla Sim)
- 2010 – Robin Andréasson (Mölndals ASS)
- 2011 – Gustav Åberg Lejdström (Helsingborgs S)
- 2012 – Robin Andréasson (Mölndals ASS)
- 2013 – Mattias Carlsson (Uddevalla Sim)
- 2014 – Adam Paulsson (SK Elfsborg)
- 2015 – Adam Paulsson (SK Elfsborg)
- 2016 – Adam Paulsson (SK Elfsborg)
- 2017 – Adam Paulsson (SK Elfsborg)
- 2018 – Adam Paulsson (SK Elfsborg)
- 2019 – Adam Paulsson (SK Elfsborg)
- 2021 – Elias Persson (Malmö KK)
- 2022 – Elias Persson (Malmö KK)

=== 800 metre freestyle ===
- 1956 – Willy Hemlin (Simavdelningen 1902)
- 1957 – Willy Hemlin (Simavdelningen 1902)
- 1958 – Willy Hemlin (Simavdelningen 1902)
- 1959 – Lars-Erik Bengtsson (SK Neptun)
- 1960 – Jan Andersson (IK Attack)
- 1961 – Sten Ekman (Tunafors SK)
- 1962 – Hans Rosendahl (Katrineholms SS)
- 1963 – Jan Lundin (Stockholmspolisens IF)
- 1964 – Ingvar Eriksson (Sundsvalls SS)
- 1965 – Ingvar Eriksson (Sundsvalls SS)
- 1966 – Lester Eriksson (SK Neptun)
- 1967 – Lester Eriksson (SK Neptun)
- 1968 – Gunnar Larsson (Malmö S)
- 1969 – Gunnar Larsson (Malmö S)
- 1970 – Sven von Holst (Stockholms KK)
- 1971 – Anders Bellbring (Upsala S)
- 2013 – Oskar Nordstrand (Helsingborgs S)
- 2014 – Adam Paulsson (SK Elfsborg)
- 2015 – Victor Johansson (Jönköpings SS)
- 2016 – Victor Johansson (Jönköpings SS)
- 2017 – Victor Johansson (Jönköpings SS)
- 2018 – Adam Paulsson (SK Elfsborg)
- 2019 – Adam Paulsson (SK Elfsborg)
- 2021 – Melker Olsson (SK Elfsborg)
- 2022 – Lucas Humling (Linköpings ASS)

=== 1500 metre freestyle ===
- 1972 – Anders Bellbring (Upsala S)
- 1973 – Anders Bellbring (Limhamns SS)
- 1974 – Bengt Gingsjö (Simavdelningen 1902)
- 1975 – Peter Pettersson (SK Laxen)
- 1976 – Gary Andersson (Norrköpings KK)
- 1977 – Gary Andersson (Kristianstads SLS)
- 1978 – Gary Andersson (Kristianstads SLS)
- 1979 – Magnus Petersson (Jönköpings SS)
- 1980 – Thomas Lejdström (Västerås SS)
- 1981 – Karl-Erik Elias (Linköpings ASS)
- 1982 – Thomas Lejdström (Västerås SS)
- 1983 – Thomas Lejdström (Västerås SS)
- 1984 – Anders Holmertz (Motala SS)
- 1985 – Anders Holmertz (Motala SS)
- 1986 – Stefan Persson (Malmö KK)
- 1987 – Stefan Persson (Malmö KK)
- 1988 – Henrik Jangwall (Malmö KK)
- 1989 – Henrik Jangwall (Malmö KK)
- 1990 – Björn Möller (Malmö KK)
- 1991 – Björn Möller (Malmö KK)
- 1992 – Jonas Lundström (Södertälje SS)
- 1993 – Jonas Lundström (Södertälje SS)
- 1994 – Jonas Lundström (Södertälje SS)
- 1995 – Jonas Lundström (Södertälje SS)
- 1996 – Ola Strömberg (Upsala S)
- 1997 – Jonas Lundström (Sundsvalls SS)
- 1998 – Jonas Lundström (Sundsvalls SS)
- 1999 – Mathias Olshed (SK Sydsim)
- 2000 – Mikael E. Rosén (Sundsvalls SS)
- 2001 – Patrik Svensson (Malmö KK)
- 2002 – Johan Claar (Jönköpings SS)
- 2003 – Johan Claar (Jönköpings SS)
- 2004 – Johan Claar (Jönköpings SS)
- 2005 – Johan Claar (Jönköpings SS)
- 2006 – Johan Claar (Jönköpings SS)
- 2007 – Johan Claar (Jönköpings SS)
- 2008 – Christoffer Wallin (Helsingborgs S)
- 2009 – Gustav Åberg Lejdström (Helsingborgs S)
- 2010 – Oscar Ekström (Linköpings ASS)
- 2011 – Gustav Åberg Lejdström (Helsingborgs S)
- 2012 – Oskar Nordstrand (Helsingborgs S)
- 2013 – Adam Paulsson (SK Elfsborg)
- 2014 – Adam Paulsson (SK Elfsborg)
- 2015 – Victor Johansson (Jönköpings SS)
- 2016 – Victor Johansson (Jönköpings SS)
- 2017 – Victor Johansson (Jönköpings SS)
- 2018 – Kristian Kron (SK Neptun)
- 2019 – Isak Eliasson (Spårvägens SF)
- 2021 – Lucas Humling (Linköpings ASS)
- 2022 – Elliot Sodemann (Malmö KK)

=== 50 metre backstroke ===
- 1990 – Göran Sköld (Södertörns SS)
- 1991 – Rudi Dollmayer (SK Ran)
- 1992 – Rudi Dollmayer (SK Ran)
- 1993 – Zsolt Hegmegi (Jönköpings SS)
- 1994 – Zsolt Hegmegi (Jönköpings SS)
- 1995 – Daniel Lönnberg (Växjö SS)
- 1996 – Zsolt Hegmegi (Jönköpings SS)
- 1997 – Daniel Carlsson (Väsby SS)
- 1998 – Daniel Carlsson (Väsby SS)
- 1999 – Daniel Carlsson (Väsby SS)
- 2000 – Daniel Carlsson (Väsby SS)
- 2001 – Daniel Lönnberg (Sundsvalls SS)
- 2002 – Daniel Lönnberg (Sundsvalls SS)
- 2003 – Mattias Ohlin (Trelleborgs SS)
- 2004 – Peter Segerlund (Stockholms KK)
- 2005 – Jens Petersson (Stockholms KK)
- 2006 – Per Nylin (Norrköpings KK)
- 2007 – Per Nylin (Norrköpings KK)
- 2008 – Michael Kostesic (Norrköpings KK)
- 2009 – Niklas Borin (Turebergs SK)
- 2010 – Niklas Borin (Turebergs SK)
- 2011 – Sebastian Holmberg (Täby Sim)
- 2012 – Niklas Borin (Turebergs SK)
- 2013 – Niklas Borin (Turebergs SK)
- 2014 – Alexander Nyström (SK Neptun)
- 2015 – Alexander Nyström (SK Neptun)
- 2016 – Alexander Nyström (SK Neptun)
- 2017 – Jesper Björk (Helsingborgs S) and Martin Nilsson (Stockholmspolisens IF)
- 2018 – Björn Seeliger (Södertälje SS)
- 2019 – Gustav Hökfelt (SK Neptun)
- 2021 – Gustav Hökfelt (SK Neptun)
- 2022 – Oskar Hoff (Landskrona SS)

=== 100 metre backstroke ===
- 1961 – Bengt-Olov Almstedt (Örebro SS)
- 1962 – Bengt-Olov Almstedt (Örebro SS)
- 1963 – Leif Sjöblom (SK Neptun)
- 1964 – Leif Sjöblom (SK Neptun)
- 1965 – Hans Ljungberg (SK Neptun)
- 1976 – Svante Zetterlund (Karlskoga SS)
- 1977 – Mikael Brandén (Stockholmspolisens IF)
- 1978 – Jan Thorell (Stockholmspolisens IF)
- 1979 – Bengt Baron (Finspångs SK)
- 1980 – Bengt Baron (SK Korrugal)
- 1981 – Bengt Baron (SK Korrugal)
- 1982 – Bengt Baron (SK Korrugal)
- 1983 – Bengt Baron (SK Korrugal)
- 1984 – Bengt Baron (SK Korrugal)
- 1985 – Rudi Dollmayer (Karlskoga SS)
- 1986 – Hans Fredin (Södertörns SS)
- 1987 – Hans Fredin (Södertörns SS)
- 1988 – Niklas Håkansson (Stockholmspolisens IF)
- 1989 – Hans Fredin (Södertörns SS)
- 1990 – Niklas Håkansson (Stockholmspolisens IF)
- 1991 – Niklas Håkansson (Stockholmspolisens IF)
- 1992 – Rudi Dollmayer (SK Ran)
- 1993 – Zsolt Hegmegi (Jönköpings SS)
- 1994 – Daniel Lönnberg (Karlskrona SS)
- 1995 – Daniel Lönnberg (Växjö SS)
- 1996 – Tobias Marklund (Sundsvalls SS)
- 1997 – Daniel Carlsson (Väsby SS) and Daniel Lönnberg (Växjö SS)
- 1998 – Daniel Carlsson (Väsby SS)
- 1999 – Daniel Carlsson (Väsby SS)
- 2000 – Mattias Ohlin (Trelleborgs SS)
- 2001 – Daniel Lönnberg (Sundsvalls SS)
- 2002 – Daniel Lönnberg (Sundsvalls SS)
- 2003 – Mattias Ohlin (Trelleborgs SS)
- 2004 – Peter Segerlund (Stockholms KK)
- 2005 – Jens Petersson (Stockholms KK)
- 2006 – Simon Sjödin (Södertörns SS)
- 2007 – Jens Petersson (Stockholms KK)
- 2008 – Konstantin Sundin (Spårvägens SF)
- 2009 – Måns Hjelm (SS Iden)
- 2010 – Niklas Borin (Turebergs SK)
- 2011 – Pontus Renholm (Stockholmspolisens IF)
- 2012 – Daniel Blackborrow (Stockholmspolisens IF)
- 2013 – Niklas Borin (Turebergs SK)
- 2014 – Alexander Nyström (SK Neptun)
- 2015 – Alexander Nyström (SK Neptun)
- 2016 – Petter Fredriksson (Malmö KK)
- 2017 – Mattias Carlsson (Malmö KK)
- 2018 – Martin Nilsson (Stockholmspolisens IF)
- 2019 – Gustav Hökfelt (SK Neptun)
- 2021 – Gustav Hökfelt (SK Neptun)
- 2022 – Samuel Törnqvist (Spårvägens SF)

=== 200 metre backstroke ===
- 1953 – Hans Andersson (Tunafors SK)
- 1954 – Göran Larsson (Stockholms KK)
- 1955 – Göran Larsson (Simavdelningen 1902)
- 1956 – Hans Andersson (Tunafors SK)
- 1957 – Hans Andersson (Tunafors SK)
- 1958 – Lars Eriksson (SoIK Hellas)
- 1959 – Bengt-Olov Almstedt (Örebro SS)
- 1960 – Lars Eriksson (Malmö S)
- 1965 – Hans Ljungberg (SK Neptun)
- 1966 – Hans Ljungberg (Bromma SS)
- 1967 – Olle Ferm (Norrköpings KK)
- 1968 – Hans Ljungberg (Bromma SS)
- 1969 – Gunnar Larsson (Malmö S)
- 1970 – Bengt Gingsjö (Simavdelningen 1902)
- 1971 – Svante Zetterlund (Karlskoga SS)
- 1972 – Anders Sandberg (Eskilstuna SS)
- 1973 – Gunnar Larsson (Malmö S)
- 1974 – Leif Ericsson (Upsala S)
- 1975 – Leif Ericsson (Upsala S)
- 1976 – Bengt Svensson (Upsala S)
- 1977 – Jan Thorell (Stockholmspolisens IF)
- 1978 – Jan Thorell (Stockholmspolisens IF)
- 1979 – Jan Thorell (Stockholmspolisens IF)
- 1980 – Bengt Baron (SK Korrugal)
- 1981 – Bengt Baron (SK Korrugal)
- 1982 – Hans Fredin (Södertörns SS)
- 1983 – Bengt Baron (SK Korrugal)
- 1984 – Bengt Baron (SK Korrugal)
- 1985 – Michael Söderlund (Karlskrona SS)
- 1986 – Hans Fredin (Södertörns SS)
- 1987 – Hans Fredin (Södertörns SS)
- 1988 – Per-Åke Brink (Jönköpings SS)
- 1989 – Hans Fredin (Södertörns SS)
- 1990 – Niklas Håkansson (Stockholmspolisens IF)
- 1991 – Martin Svensson (Jönköpings SS)
- 1992 – Daniel Lönnberg (Karlskrona SS)
- 1993 – Tobias Marklund (Piteå Sim)
- 1994 – Tobias Marklund (Piteå Sim)
- 1995 – Pär Gustafsson (Ängelholms SS)
- 1996 – Tobias Marklund (Sundsvalls SS)
- 1997 – Tobias Marklund (Sundsvalls SS)
- 1998 – Tobias Marklund (Spårvägens SF)
- 1999 – Joakim Olsson (Södertörns SS)
- 2000 – Mattias Ohlin (Trelleborgs SS)
- 2001 – Erik Pönni (Jönköpings SS)
- 2002 – Jens Petersson (Stockholms KK)
- 2003 – Mattias Ohlin (Trelleborgs SS)
- 2004 – Pontus Renholm (Stockholmspolisens IF)
- 2005 – Pontus Renholm (Stockholmspolisens IF)
- 2006 – Konstantin Sundin (Spårvägens SF)
- 2007 – Simon Sjödin (SK Neptun)
- 2008 – Mattias Carlsson (Uddevalla Sim)
- 2009 – Mattias Carlsson (Uddevalla Sim)
- 2010 – Kristian Kron (Helsingborgs S)
- 2011 – Simon Sjödin (SK Neptun)
- 2012 – Kristian Kron (Helsingborgs S)
- 2013 – Axel Pettersson (Jönköpings SS)
- 2014 – Simon Sjödin (SK Neptun)
- 2015 – Mattias Carlsson (Uddevalla Sim)
- 2016 – Petter Fredriksson (Malmö KK)
- 2017 – Kristian Kron (Helsingborgs S)
- 2018 – Kristian Kron (SK Neptun)
- 2019 – Gustav Hökfelt (SK Neptun)
- 2021 – Adi Ramovic (Upsala S)
- 2022 – Samuel Törnqvist (Spårvägens SF)

=== 50 metre breaststroke ===
- 1990 – Anders Stensson (Upsala S)
- 1991 – Jan Stensson (Upsala S)
- 1992 – Patrik Isaksson (Västerås SS)
- 1993 – Patric Robertsson (Södertälje SS)
- 1994 – Patric Robertsson (Södertälje SS)
- 1995 – Patric Robertsson (Södertälje SS)
- 1996 – Jens Johansson (Sundsvalls SS)
- 1997 – Patric Robertsson (Södertälje SS)
- 1998 – Patrik Isaksson (Västerås SS)
- 1999 – Christian Clausen (Trelleborgs SS)
- 2000 – Martin Gustavsson (Malmö KK)
- 2001 – Stefan Nystrand (Södertörns SS)
- 2002 – Jens Johansson (Sundsvalls SS)
- 2003 – Stefan Nystrand (Södertörns SS)
- 2004 – Martin Gustavsson (Malmö KK)
- 2005 – Jakob Dorch (Linköpings ASS)
- 2006 – Per Nylin (Norrköpings KK)
- 2007 – Per Nylin (Norrköpings KK)
- 2008 – Martin Gustavsson (Malmö KK)
- 2009 – Stefan Nystrand (SK Neptun)
- 2010 – Jakob Dorch (Linköpings ASS)
- 2011 – Jakob Dorch (Linköpings ASS)
- 2012 – Johannes Skagius (Sundsvalls SS)
- 2013 – Johannes Skagius (Sundsvalls SS)
- 2014 – Johannes Skagius (Sundsvalls SS)
- 2015 – Johannes Skagius (Sundsvalls SS)
- 2016 – Johannes Skagius (Sundsvalls SS)
- 2017 – Johannes Skagius (Sundsvalls SS)
- 2018 – Johannes Skagius (SK Neptun)
- 2019 – Johannes Skagius (SK Neptun)
- 2021 – Johannes Skagius (SK Neptun)
- 2022 – Oskar Hoff (Landskrona SS)

=== 100 metre breaststroke ===
- 1954 – Lennart Brock (SK Poseidon)
- 1955 – Rolf Junefelt (Jönköpings SLS)
- 1956 – Rolf Junefelt (Jönköpings SLS)
- 1957 – Bertil Liljenberg (SK Poseidon)
- 1958 – Roland Lundin (SK Ran)
- 1976 – Anders Norling (Stockholmspolisens IF)
- 1977 – Anders Norling (Stockholmspolisens IF)
- 1978 – Mikael Tredahl (Stockholmspolisens IF)
- 1979 – Anders Norling (Stockholmspolisens IF)
- 1980 – Peter Berggren (Skärets SS)
- 1981 – Hans Bergqvist (Sundsvalls SS)
- 1982 – Peter Berggren (Skärets SS)
- 1983 – Peter Berggren (Skärets SS)
- 1984 – Peter Berggren (Skärets SS)
- 1985 – Peter Berggren (Skärets SS)
- 1986 – Peter Berggren (Skärets SS)
- 1987 – Peter Berggren (Skärets SS)
- 1988 – Jan Stensson (Hagfors SS)
- 1989 – Peter Berggren (Skärets SS)
- 1990 – Jan Stensson (Upsala S)
- 1991 – Patrik Isaksson (Västerås SS)
- 1992 – Peter Haraldsson (Södertälje SS)
- 1993 – Magnus Classén (Norrköpings KK)
- 1994 – Peter Karlsson (Västerås SS)
- 1995 – Jens Johansson (Sundsvalls SS)
- 1996 – Jens Johansson (Sundsvalls SS)
- 1997 – Jens Johansson (Sundsvalls SS)
- 1998 – Patrik Isaksson (Västerås SS)
- 1999 – Patrik Isaksson (Västerås SS)
- 2000 – Martin Gustavsson (Malmö KK)
- 2001 – Patrik Isaksson (Västerås SS)
- 2002 – Jens Johansson (Sundsvalls SS)
- 2003 – Martin Gustavsson (Malmö KK)
- 2004 – Martin Gustavsson (Malmö KK)
- 2005 – Jakob Dorch (Linköpings ASS)
- 2006 – Martin Gustavsson (Malmö KK)
- 2007 – Christer Tour (SK Neptun)
- 2008 – Martin Gustavsson (Malmö KK)
- 2009 – Jakob Dorch (Linköpings ASS)
- 2010 – Jakob Dorch (Linköpings ASS)
- 2011 – Jakob Dorch (Linköpings ASS)
- 2012 – Johannes Skagius (Sundsvalls SS)
- 2013 – Johannes Skagius (Sundsvalls SS)
- 2014 – Johannes Skagius (Sundsvalls SS)
- 2015 – Johannes Skagius (Sundsvalls SS)
- 2016 – Johannes Skagius (Sundsvalls SS)
- 2017 – Johannes Skagius (Sundsvalls SS)
- 2018 – Johannes Skagius (SK Neptun)
- 2019 – Johannes Skagius (SK Neptun)
- 2021 – Johannes Skagius (SK Neptun)
- 2022 – Erik Persson (Kungsbacka SS)

=== 200 metre breaststroke ===
- 1959 – Tommie Lindström (Stockholmspolisens IF)
- 1960 – Tommie Lindström (Stockholmspolisens IF)
- 1961 – Tommie Lindström (Stockholmspolisens IF)
- 1962 – Tommie Lindström (Stockholmspolisens IF)
- 1963 – Roland Lundin (SK Ran)
- 1964 – Björn Finnsson (Stockholmspolisens IF)
- 1965 – Ulf Ericsson (Katrineholms SS)
- 1966 – Thomas Johnsson (Skövde SS)
- 1967 – Thomas Johnsson (Skövde SS)
- 1968 – Thomas Johnsson (Skövde SS)
- 1969 – Thomas Johnsson (Skövde SS)
- 1970 – Thomas Johnsson (Skövde SS)
- 1971 – Göran Eriksson (Göteborgs KK Najaden)
- 1972 – Göran Eriksson (Göteborgs KK Najaden)
- 1973 – Anders Häggqvist (Falu SS)
- 1974 – Anders Norling (Stockholmspolisens IF)
- 1975 – Anders Norling (Stockholmspolisens IF)
- 1976 – Anders Norling (Stockholmspolisens IF)
- 1977 – Anders Norling (Stockholmspolisens IF)
- 1978 – Mikael Tredahl (Stockholmspolisens IF)
- 1979 – Anders Norling (Stockholmspolisens IF)
- 1980 – Peter Berggren (Skärets SS)
- 1981 – Peter Berggren (Skärets SS)
- 1982 – Peter Berggren (Skärets SS)
- 1983 – Peter Berggren (Skärets SS)
- 1984 – Peter Berggren (Skärets SS)
- 1985 – Peter Berggren (Skärets SS)
- 1986 – Peter Berggren (Skärets SS)
- 1987 – Anders Peterson (Mariestads SS)
- 1988 – Jan Bidrman (Malmö KK)
- 1989 – Jan Bidrman (Malmö KK)
- 1990 – Magnus Leth (SK Poseidon)
- 1991 – Anders Stensson (Upsala S)
- 1992 – Michael Alpfors (Malmö KK)
- 1993 – Conny Wennberg (Turebergs IF)
- 1994 – Fredrik Rosenholm (Spårvägens SF)
- 1995 – Willy Ahlström (SK Neptun)
- 1996 – Patrik Isaksson (Västerås SS)
- 1997 – Peter Aronsson (Spårvägens SF)
- 1998 – Patrik Isaksson (Västerås SS)
- 1999 – Christian Clausen (Trelleborgs SS)
- 2000 – Sverker Persson (Helsingborgs S)
- 2001 – Patrik Isaksson (Västerås SS)
- 2002 – Martin Gustavsson (Malmö KK)
- 2003 – Martin Gustavsson (Malmö KK)
- 2004 – Martin Gustavsson (Malmö KK)
- 2005 – Martin Gustavsson (Malmö KK)
- 2006 – Martin Gustavsson (Malmö KK)
- 2007 – Axel Pettersson (SK Neptun)
- 2008 – Martin Gustavsson (Malmö KK)
- 2009 – Anton Lagerqvist (Göteborg Sim)
- 2010 – Simon Sjödin (SK Neptun)
- 2011 – Simon Sjödin (SK Neptun)
- 2012 – Johannes Skagius (Sundsvalls SS)
- 2013 – Erik Persson (Kungsbacka SS)
- 2014 – Erik Persson (Kungsbacka SS)
- 2015 – Erik Persson (Kungsbacka SS)
- 2016 – Adam Paulsson (SK Elfsborg)
- 2017 – Erik Persson (Kungsbacka SS)
- 2018 – Erik Persson (Kungsbacka SS)
- 2019 – Erik Persson (Kungsbacka SS)
- 2021 – Patric Ridell (SK Neptun)
- 2022 – Erik Persson (Kungsbacka SS)

=== 50 metre butterfly ===
- 1990 – Jan Karlsson (Borlänge SS)
- 1991 – Jan Karlsson (Borlänge SS)
- 1992 – Jan Karlsson (Borlänge SS)
- 1993 – Jonas Åkesson (Södertälje SS)
- 1994 – Jonas Åkesson (Södertälje SS)
- 1995 – Jonas Åkesson (Södertälje SS)
- 1996 – Jonas Åkesson (Södertälje SS)
- 1997 – Ola Fagerstrand (Malmö KK)
- 1998 – Daniel Carlsson (Väsby SS)
- 1999 – Daniel Carlsson (Väsby SS)
- 2000 – Daniel Carlsson (Väsby SS)
- 2001 – Tero Välimaa (SK Neptun)
- 2002 – Lars Frölander (Linköpings ASS)
- 2003 – Lars Frölander (Linköpings ASS)
- 2004 – Tero Välimaa (Väsby SS)
- 2005 – Marcus Piehl (Linköpings ASS)
- 2006 – Lars Frölander (Linköpings ASS)
- 2007 – Lars Frölander (Linköpings ASS)
- 2008 – Lars Frölander (Linköpings ASS)
- 2009 – Lars Frölander (Linköpings ASS)
- 2010 – Lars Frölander (Linköpings ASS)
- 2011 – Stefan Nystrand (Spårvägens SF)
- 2012 – Alexander Nyström (SK Neptun)
- 2013 – Lars Frölander (Linköpings ASS)
- 2014 – Henrik Lindau (Karlskrona SS)
- 2015 – Alexander Frost (Norrköpings KK)
- 2016 – Jesper Björk (Helsingborgs S)
- 2017 – Alexander Frost (Västerås SS)
- 2018 – Sebastian Holmberg (SK Neptun)
- 2019 – Christoffer Carlsen (Helsingborgs S)
- 2021 – Oskar Hoff (Landskrona SS)
- 2022 – Oskar Hoff (Landskrona SS)

=== 100 metre butterfly ===
- 1953 – Bo Larsson (SK Neptun)
- 1954 – Bo Larsson (SK Neptun)
- 1955 – Bo Larsson (SK Neptun)
- 1956 – Bo Larsson (SK Neptun)
- 1957 – Rolf Friberg (Jönköpings SLS)
- 1958 – Peter Bergengren (Skellefteå SK)
- 1959 – Rolf Friberg (Jönköpings SLS)
- 1960 – Håkan Bengtsson (Stockholmspolisens IF)
- 1961 – Håkan Bengtsson (Stockholmspolisens IF)
- 1962 – Per Jernberg (Mariestads SS)
- 1963 – Per Jernberg (Mariestads SS)
- 1964 – Ingvar Eriksson (Sundsvalls SS)
- 1965 – Ingvar Eriksson (Sundsvalls SS)
- 1976 – Tommy Lindell (Stockholmspolisens IF)
- 1977 – Pär Arvidsson (Finspångs SK)
- 1978 – Tommy Lindell (Stockholmspolisens IF)
- 1979 – Pär Arvidsson (Finspångs SK)
- 1980 – Bengt Baron (SK Korrugal)
- 1981 – Pär Arvidsson (SK Korrugal)
- 1982 – Pär Arvidsson (SK Korrugal)
- 1983 – Pär Arvidsson (SK Korrugal)
- 1984 – Bengt Baron (SK Korrugal)
- 1985 – Mikael Holmertz (Motala SS)
- 1986 – Mikael Holmertz (Motala SS)
- 1987 – Viktor Olsson (Helsingborgs S)
- 1988 – Anders Rasmusson (Helsingborgs S)
- 1989 – Christer Wallin (Mölndals ASS)
- 1990 – Jan Bidrman (Malmö KK)
- 1991 – Jonas Lögdberg (Täby Sim)
- 1992 – Lars Frölander (Borlänge SS)
- 1993 – Lars Frölander (Borlänge SS)
- 1994 – Jan Karlsson (Borlänge SS)
- 1995 – Johan Setterberg (Mölndals ASS)
- 1996 – Daniel Carlsson (Väsby SS)
- 1997 – Ola Fagerstrand (Malmö KK)
- 1998 – Daniel Carlsson (Väsby SS)
- 1999 – Lars Frölander (Sundsvalls SS)
- 2000 – Lars Frölander (Sundsvalls SS)
- 2001 – Tero Välimaa (SK Neptun)
- 2002 – Lars Frölander (Linköpings ASS)
- 2003 – Lars Frölander (Linköpings ASS)
- 2004 – Tero Välimaa (Väsby SS)
- 2005 – Erik Andersson (Göteborg Sim)
- 2006 – Lars Frölander (Linköpings ASS)
- 2007 – Lars Frölander (Linköpings ASS)
- 2008 – Erik Andersson (Linköpings ASS)
- 2009 – Erik Andersson (Linköpings ASS)
- 2010 – Lars Frölander (Linköpings ASS)
- 2011 – Lars Frölander (Linköpings ASS)
- 2012 – Simon Sjödin (SK Neptun)
- 2013 – Alexander Nyström (SK Neptun)
- 2014 – Jacob Thulin (SK Neptun)
- 2015 – Jesper Björk (Helsingborgs S)
- 2016 – Jesper Björk (Helsingborgs S)
- 2017 – Oskar Hoff (Landskrona SS)
- 2018 – Jesper Jonsson (Södertörns SS)
- 2019 – Christoffer Carlsen (Helsingborgs S)
- 2021 – Oskar Hoff (Landskrona SS)
- 2022 – Oskar Hoff (Landskrona SS)

=== 200 metre butterfly ===
- 1966 – Peter Feil (Eskilstuna SS)
- 1967 – Bo Westergren (Stockholmspolisens IF)
- 1968 – Peter Feil (Eskilstuna SS)
- 1969 – Bo Westergren (Stockholmspolisens IF)
- 1970 – Anders Bellbring (Upsala S)
- 1971 – Peter Feil (Eskilstuna SS)
- 1972 – Peter Feil (Eskilstuna SS)
- 1973 – Risto Kaipanen (Stockholmspolisens IF)
- 1974 – Risto Kaipanen (Stockholmspolisens IF)
- 1975 – Risto Kaipanen (Stockholmspolisens IF)
- 1976 – Anders Bellbring (Simavdelningen 1902)
- 1977 – Pär Arvidsson (Finspångs SK)
- 1978 – Tommy Lindell (Stockholmspolisens IF)
- 1979 – Pär Arvidsson (Finspångs SK)
- 1980 – Thomas Lejdström (Västerås SS)
- 1981 – Pär Arvidsson (SK Korrugal)
- 1982 – Pär Arvidsson (SK Korrugal)
- 1983 – Pär Arvidsson (SK Korrugal)
- 1984 – Thomas Lejdström (Västerås SS)
- 1985 – Thomas Lejdström (Västerås SS)
- 1986 – Stefan Gullberg (Stockholmspolisens IF)
- 1987 – Jan Bidrman (Malmö KK)
- 1988 – Christer Wallin (Mölndals ASS)
- 1989 – Christer Wallin (Mölndals ASS)
- 1990 – Stefan Pärlklo (Stockholmspolisens IF)
- 1991 – Mats Rasmusson (Helsingborgs S)
- 1992 – Gustaf Johansson (Täby Sim)
- 1993 – Gustaf Johansson (Stockholmspolisens IF)
- 1994 – Stefan Gullberg (Stockholmspolisens IF)
- 1995 – Fredrik Lundin (Ystads SS)
- 1996 – Johan Mattsson (SK Triton)
- 1997 – Fredrik Lundin (SK Neptun)
- 1998 – Michael Jacobsson (Täby Sim)
- 1999 – Carl Gårdmark (Ystads SS)
- 2000 – Tero Välimaa (SK Neptun)
- 2001 – Tero Välimaa (SK Neptun)
- 2002 – Tero Välimaa (SK Neptun)
- 2003 – Johannes Nordenstam (Väsby SS)
- 2004 – Tero Välimaa (Väsby SS)
- 2005 – Jesper Levander (Södertörns SS)
- 2006 – Simon Sjödin (Södertörns SS)
- 2007 – Johan Claar (Jönköpings SS)
- 2008 – Linus Junefelt (Jönköpings SS)
- 2009 – Christoffer Wallin (Helsingborgs S)
- 2010 – Jesper Jonsson (Växjö SS)
- 2011 – Alexander Linge (Linköpings ASS)
- 2012 – Simon Sjödin (SK Neptun)
- 2013 – Simon Sjödin (SK Neptun)
- 2014 – Simon Sjödin (SK Neptun)
- 2015 – Simon Sjödin (SK Neptun)
- 2016 – Simon Sjödin (SK Neptun)
- 2017 – Simon Sjödin (SK Neptun)
- 2018 – Simon Sjödin (SK Neptun)
- 2019 – Simon Sjödin (SK Neptun)
- 2021 – Simon Sjödin (SK Neptun)
- 2022 – Victor Klingeryd Jalamo (Helsingborgs S)

=== 100 metre individual medley ===
- 1991 – Hans-Olov Nilsson (Malmö KK)
- 1992 – Anders Holmertz (Spårvägens SF)
- 1993 – Anders Holmertz (Spårvägens SF)
- 1994 – Peter Haraldsson (Södertälje SS)
- 1995 – Ola Frejd (SK Neptun)
- 1996 – Pär Gustafsson (Ängelholms SS)
- 1997 – Johan Nyström (Sundsvalls SS)
- 1998 – Patrik Isaksson (Västerås SS)
- 1999 – Patrik Isaksson (Västerås SS)
- 2000 – David Gustafsson (Norrköpings KK)
- 2001 – Stefan Nystrand (Södertörns SS)
- 2002 – Erik Dorch (Linköpings ASS)
- 2003 – Erik Dorch (Linköpings ASS)
- 2004 – Filip Lundeholm (Jönköpings SS)
- 2005 – Erik Dorch (Linköpings ASS)
- 2006 – Per Nylin (Norrköpings KK)
- 2007 – Per Nylin (Norrköpings KK)
- 2008 – Per Nylin (Norrköpings KK)
- 2009 – Måns Hjelm (SS Iden)
- 2010 – Måns Hjelm (Malmö KK)
- 2011 – Sebastian Holmberg (Täby Sim)
- 2012 – Simon Sjödin (SK Neptun)
- 2013 – Sebastian Holmberg (SK Neptun)
- 2014 – Alexander Nyström (SK Neptun)
- 2015 – Alexander Nyström (SK Neptun)
- 2016 – Simon Sjödin (SK Neptun)
- 2017 – Simon Sjödin (SK Neptun)
- 2018 – Simon Sjödin (SK Neptun)
- 2019 – Simon Sjödin (SK Neptun)
- 2021 – Simon Sjödin (SK Neptun)
- 2022 – Oskar Hoff (Landskrona SS)

=== 200 metre individual medley ===
- 1959 – Willy Hemlin (Simavdelningen 1902)
- 1960 – Rolf Friberg (Jönköpings SLS)
- 1968 – Gunnar Larsson (Malmö S)
- 1969 – Hans Ljungberg (Malmö S)
- 1970 – Hans Ljungberg (Timrå AIF)
- 1971 – Hans Ljungberg (Timrå AIF)
- 1976 – Anders Norling (Stockholmspolisens IF)
- 1977 – Anders Ottosson (Kristianstads SLS)
- 1978 – Gary Andersson (Kristianstads SLS)
- 1979 – Pär Arvidsson (Finspångs SK)
- 1980 – Gary Andersson (Västerås SS)
- 1981 – Bengt Baron (SK Korrugal)
- 1982 – Per Holmertz (Stockholmspolisens IF)
- 1983 – Mikael Örn (Kristianstads SLS)
- 1984 – Anders Peterson (Mariestads SS)
- 1985 – Mikael Örn (Kristianstads SLS)
- 1986 – Anders Peterson (Mariestads SS)
- 1987 – Jan Bidrman (Malmö KK)
- 1988 – Jan Bidrman (Malmö KK)
- 1989 – Jan Bidrman (Malmö KK)
- 1990 – Jan Bidrman (Malmö KK)
- 1991 – Anders Holmertz (Spårvägens SF)
- 1992 – Anders Holmertz (Spårvägens SF)
- 1993 – Daniel Karlsson (Täby Sim)
- 1994 – Daniel Karlsson (Täby Sim)
- 1995 – Fredrik Lundin (Ystads SS)
- 1996 – Daniel Karlsson (Täby Sim)
- 1997 – Michael Jacobsson (Täby Sim)
- 1998 – Patrik Isaksson (Västerås SS)
- 1999 – David Gustafsson (Norrköpings KK)
- 2000 – David Gustafsson (Norrköpings KK)
- 2001 – David Gustafsson (Norrköpings KK)
- 2002 – Michael Jacobsson (Täby Sim)
- 2003 – Michael Jacobsson (Täby Sim)
- 2004 – Erik Samuelsson (Väsby SS)
- 2005 – Erik Samuelsson (Väsby SS)
- 2006 – Axel Pettersson (SK Neptun)
- 2007 – Simon Sjödin (SK Neptun)
- 2008 – Simon Sjödin (SK Neptun)
- 2009 – Christoffer Wallin (Helsingborgs S)
- 2010 – Linus Kanth (Västerås SS)
- 2011 – Sebastian Holmberg (Täby Sim)
- 2012 – Simon Sjödin (SK Neptun)
- 2013 – Simon Sjödin (SK Neptun)
- 2014 – Simon Sjödin (SK Neptun)
- 2015 – Simon Sjödin (SK Neptun)
- 2016 – Simon Sjödin (SK Neptun)
- 2017 – Simon Sjödin (SK Neptun)
- 2018 – Simon Sjödin (SK Neptun)
- 2019 – Simon Sjödin (SK Neptun)
- 2021 – Simon Sjödin (SK Neptun)
- 2022 – Simon Sjödin (SK Neptun)

=== 400 metre individual medley ===
- 1972 – Gunnar Larsson (Malmö S)
- 1973 – Gunnar Larsson (Malmö S)
- 1974 – Bengt Gingsjö (Simavdelningen 1902)
- 1975 – Bengt Gingsjö (Simavdelningen 1902)
- 1976 – Mikael Nyström (SK Neptun)
- 1977 – Pär Arvidsson (Finspångs SK)
- 1978 – Gary Andersson (Kristianstads SLS)
- 1979 – Thomas Lejdström (Västerås SS)
- 1980 – Thomas Lejdström (Västerås SS)
- 1981 – Thomas Lejdström (Västerås SS)
- 1982 – Thomas Lejdström (Västerås SS)
- 1983 – Thomas Lejdström (Västerås SS)
- 1984 – Thomas Lejdström (Västerås SS)
- 1985 – Stefan Persson (Malmö KK)
- 1986 – Stefan Persson (Malmö KK)
- 1987 – Jan Bidrman (Malmö KK)
- 1988 – Jan Bidrman (Malmö KK)
- 1989 – Jan Bidrman (Malmö KK)
- 1990 – Jan Bidrman (Malmö KK)
- 1991 – Björn Möller (Malmö KK)
- 1992 – Daniel Karlsson (Täby Sim)
- 1993 – Fredrik Lundin (Ystads SS)
- 1994 – Daniel Karlsson (Täby Sim)
- 1995 – Fredrik Lundin (Ystads SS)
- 1996 – Fredrik Lundin (Ystads SS)
- 1997 – Michael Jacobsson (Täby Sim)
- 1998 – Michael Jacobsson (Täby Sim)
- 1999 – Joakim Andersson (Göteborg Sim)
- 2000 – Johan Sundqvist (Jönköpings SS)
- 2001 – Johan Sundqvist (Malmö KK)
- 2002 – Dan Hellström (Malmö KK)
- 2003 – Michael Jacobsson (Täby Sim)
- 2004 – Axel Pettersson (SK Neptun)
- 2005 – Axel Pettersson (SK Neptun)
- 2006 – Axel Pettersson (SK Neptun)
- 2007 – Simon Sjödin (SK Neptun)
- 2008 – Simon Sjödin (SK Neptun)
- 2009 – Simon Frank (SK Neptun)
- 2010 – Kristian Kron (Helsingborgs S)
- 2011 – Fredrich Risebrandt (Uddevalla Sim)
- 2012 – Simon Sjödin (SK Neptun)
- 2013 – Simon Sjödin (SK Neptun)
- 2014 – Simon Sjödin (SK Neptun)
- 2015 – Adam Paulsson (SK Elfsborg)
- 2016 – Simon Sjödin (SK Neptun)
- 2017 – Adam Paulsson (SK Elfsborg)
- 2018 – Adam Paulsson (SK Elfsborg)
- 2019 – Adam Paulsson (SK Elfsborg)
- 2021 – Simon Sjödin (SK Neptun)
- 2022 – Filip Salbrink (SK Poseidon)

=== 4 × 50 metre freestyle relay ===
- 1990 – Upsala S
- 1991 – Upsala S (Magnus Rönnevall, Lars-Ove Jansson, Jan Stensson & Rikard Milton)
- 1992 – Karlskrona SS
- 1993 – Borlänge SS
- 1994 – Upsala S
- 1995 – Upsala S
- 1996 – Jönköpings SS
- 1997 – Upsala S (Magnus Rönnevall, Pär Lindström, David Kollstedt & Ulf Eriksson)
- 1998 – Upsala S (Kenneth Nyman, Pär Lindström, Lars-Ove Jansson & David Kollstedt)
- 1999 – Södertälje SS (John Miranda, Patric Robertsson, Jan Helgesson & Pär Helgesson)
- 2000 – Södertälje SS (John Miranda, Patric Robertsson, Jan Helgesson & Pär Helgesson)
- 2001 – Sundsvalls SS (Johan Nyström, Daniel Lönnberg, Johan Backlund & Lars Frölander)
- 2002 – Linköpings ASS (Rickard Piehl, Erik Dorch, Lars Frölander & Marcus Piehl)
- 2003 – Linköpings ASS (Marcus Piehl, Lars Frölander, Rickard Piehl & Erik Dorch)
- 2004 – Linköpings ASS (Marcus Piehl, Rickard Piehl, Erik Dorch & Lars Frölander)
- 2005 – Linköpings ASS (Marcus Piehl, Erik Dorch, Filip Lundeholm & Hans Albrektsson)
- 2006 – SK Neptun (Pontus Flodqvist, Stefan Nystrand, Johan Wallberg & Petter Stymne)
- 2007 – SK Neptun (Pontus Flodqvist, Stefan Nystrand, Petter Stymne & Peter Edvardsson)
- 2008 – SK Neptun (Petter Stymne, Stefan Nystrand, Radovan Siljevski & Pontus Flodqvist)
- 2009 – SK Neptun (Petter Stymne, Stefan Nystrand, Simon Sjödin & Pontus Flodqvist)
- 2010 – SK Neptun (Petter Stymne, Alexander Nyström, Simon Sjödin & Peter Edvardsson)
- 2011 – SK Neptun (Petter Stymne, Pontus Flodqvist, Alexander Nyström & Sebastian Wikström)
- 2012 – SK Neptun (Pontus Flodqvist, Alexander Nyström, Simon Sjödin & Christoffer Vikström)
- 2013 – Mölndals ASS (Christoffer Carlsen, Robin Andréasson, Isak Eliasson & David Nordenlilja)
- 2014 – SK Neptun (Alexander Nyström, Petter Stymne, Simon Sjödin & Christoffer Vikström)
- 2015 – Helsingborgs S (Christoffer Carlsen, Isak Eliasson, Fabian Steen & Jonas Holmström)
- 2016 – SK Neptun (Linus Magnusson, Alexander Nyström, Simon Sjödin & Petter Stymne)
- 2017 – Helsingborgs S (Erik Kähr, Christoffer Carlsen, Jesper Björk & Jonas Holmström)
- 2018 – SK Neptun (Linus Magnusson, Simon Sjödin, Sebastian Holmberg & Petter Stymne)
- 2019 – SK Neptun (Pontus Flodqvist, Erik Kähr, Gustav Hökfelt & Olle Sköld)
- 2021 – SK Neptun (Pontus Flodqvist, Gustav Hökfelt, Simon Sjödin & Olle Sköld)
- 2022 – Spårvägens SF (Isak Eliasson, Jonathan Kling, Rasmus Hanson & Samuel Törnqvist)

=== 4 × 100 metre freestyle relay ===
- 1953 – SK Poseidon
- 1954 – SK Poseidon
- 1955 – SK Poseidon
- 1956 – SK Poseidon
- 1957 – Simavdelningen 1902
- 1958 – SK Neptun (Per-Olof Ericsson, Lars Hennix, Bengt Nordvall & Per-Ola Lindberg)
- 1959 – SK Neptun (Per-Olof Ericsson, Rune Jansson, Bengt Nordvall & Per-Ola Lindberg)
- 1960 – SK Neptun (Per-Olof Ericsson, Leif Wolmsten, Bengt Nordvall & Per-Ola Lindberg)
- 1961 – SK Neptun (Per-Ola Lindberg, Per-Olof Ericsson, Lars-Erik Bengtsson & Bengt Nordvall)
- 1962 – SK Neptun (Per-Olof Ericsson, Leif Wolmsten, Bengt Nordvall & Lars-Erik Bengtsson)
- 1963 – SK Neptun
- 1964 – SK Neptun
- 1965 – SK Neptun
- 1966 – SK Neptun
- 1967 – SK Neptun
- 1968 – SK Neptun
- 1969 – Luleå SS (Hans Lundström, Bo Åman, Anders Brännström & Jan Lundmark)
- 1970 – Stockholmspolisens IF
- 1971 – Timrå AIF
- 1976 – Simavdelningen 1902
- 1977 – Borlänge SS
- 1978 – Kristianstads SLS
- 1979 – Borlänge SS
- 1980 – Borlänge SS
- 1981 – Stockholmspolisens IF
- 1982 – Stockholmspolisens IF
- 1983 – Borlänge SS (Per Wikström, Jan Nilsson, Anders Norberg & Per Johansson)
- 1984 – Borlänge SS
- 1985 – Upsala S
- 1986 – Upsala S
- 1987 – Helsingborgs S (Sten Williamsson, Viktor Olsson, Nils Liedberg & Tony Lennartsson)
- 1988 – Borlänge SS
- 1989 – Borlänge SS (Magnus Eriksson, Pär Helgesson, Jan Karlsson & Per Johansson)
- 1990 – Karlskrona SS
- 1991 – Upsala S (Magnus Rönnevall, Lars-Ove Jansson, Rikard Milton & Ulf Eriksson)
- 1992 – Karlskrona SS
- 1993 – Jönköpings SS
- 1994 – Spårvägens SF
- 1995 – Spårvägens SF
- 1996 – Sundsvalls SS (Johan Nyström, Niklas Åhlin, Tobias Marklund & Magnus Frölander)
- 1997 – Spårvägens SF (Fredrik Letzler, Anders Holmertz, Jonas Åkesson & Peter Aronsson)
- 1998 – Spårvägens SF (Jonas Åkesson, Fredrik Letzler, Tobias Marklund & Peter Aronsson)
- 1999 – Spårvägens SF (Fredrik Letzler, Jonas Åkesson, Jim Westman & Ola Fagerstrand)
- 2000 – Sundsvalls SS (Johan Nyström, Mikael E. Rosén, Lars Frölander & Johan Backlund)
- 2001 – Sundsvalls SS (Johan Backlund, Daniel Lönnberg, Johan Nyström & Lars Frölander)
- 2002 – Södertörns SS (Johan Levander, Mikael Larsson, Jesper Levander & Stefan Nystrand)
- 2003 – Linköpings ASS (Marcus Piehl, Lars Frölander, Erik Dorch & Rickard Piehl)
- 2004 – Södertörns SS (Johan Levander, Jesper Levander, Stefan Nystrand & Mikael Larsson)
- 2005 – Linköpings ASS (Marcus Piehl, Erik Dorch, Filip Lundeholm & Hans Albrektsson)
- 2006 – Linköpings ASS (Marcus Piehl, Erik Andersson, Erik Dorch & Lars Frölander)
- 2007 – SK Neptun (Pontus Flodqvist, Petter Stymne, Stefan Nystrand & Peter Edvardsson)
- 2008 – SK Neptun (Pontus Flodqvist, Radovan Siljevski, Stefan Nystrand & Simon Sjödin)
- 2009 – SK Neptun (Petter Stymne, Stefan Nystrand, Christoffer Vikström & Simon Sjödin)
- 2010 – SK Neptun (Stefan Nystrand, Alexander Nyström, Petter Stymne & Pontus Flodqvist)
- 2011 – Linköpings ASS (Oscar Ekström, Lars Frölander, Alexander Linge & Marcus Piehl)
- 2012 – SK Neptun (Christoffer Vikström, Alexander Nyström, Simon Sjödin & Peter Edvardsson)
- 2013 – SK Neptun (Petter Stymne, Alexander Nyström, Christoffer Vikström & Simon Sjödin)
- 2014 – SK Neptun (Jacob Thulin, Alexander Nyström, Simon Sjödin & Petter Stymne)
- 2015 – Helsingborgs S (Christoffer Carlsen, Isak Eliasson, Kristian Kron & Jonas Holmström)
- 2016 – Helsingborgs S (Isak Eliasson, Jonas Holmström, Jesper Björk & Christoffer Carlsen)
- 2017 – Helsingborgs S (Christoffer Carlsen, Jonas Holmström, Jesper Björk & Kristian Kron)
- 2018 – Helsingborgs S (Christoffer Carlsen, Jonas Holmström, Jesper Björk & Johan Rydahl)
- 2019 – SK Neptun (Olle Sköld, Fabian Bergman, Simon Sjödin & Gustav Hökfelt)
- 2021 – SK Neptun (Olle Sköld, Simon Sjödin, Gustav Hökfelt & Tim Rogersson)
- 2022 – Spårvägens SF (Jonathan Kling, Isak Eliasson, Rasmus Hanson & Samuel Törnqvist)

=== 4 × 200 metre freestyle relay ===
- 1972 – Timrå AIF
- 1973 – SKK-Spårvägen
- 1974 – Simavdelningen 1902
- 1975 – Falu SS
- 1976 – Simavdelningen 1902
- 1977 – Borlänge SS
- 1978 – Upsala S
- 1979 – Kristianstads SLS
- 1980 – Västerås SS
- 1981 – Västerås SS
- 1982 – Stockholmspolisens IF
- 1983 – Kristianstads SLS (Håkan Jönsson, Ulf Håkansson, Göran Rosenberg & Mikael Örn)
- 1984 – Stockholmspolisens IF
- 1985 – Upsala S
- 1986 – Motala SS (Anders Holmertz, Mikael Holmertz, Per Holmertz & Henrik Leek)
- 1987 – Malmö KK (Jan Bidrman, Bill Strömberg, Robert Johnsson & Stefan Persson)
- 1988 – Malmö KK
- 1989 – Upsala S (Magnus Olafsson, Ulf Eriksson, Lars-Ove Jansson & Rikard Milton)
- 1994 – Spårvägens SF
- 1995 – Spårvägens SF
- 1996 – Sundsvalls SS (Mikael E. Rosén, Johan Nyström, Niklas Åhlin & Tobias Marklund)
- 1997 – Sundsvalls SS (Jonas Lundström, Mikael E. Rosén, Niclas Öhman & Tobias Marklund)
- 1998 – Malmö KK (Patrik Svensson, Max von Bodungen, Nicklas Svensson & Fredrik Engdahl)
- 1999 – SK Neptun (Marcus Fahlén, Anders Forsberg, Johan Wallberg & Stefano Prestinoni)
- 2000 – SK Neptun (Tero Välimaa, Johan Wallberg, Anders Forsberg & Peter Edvardsson)
- 2001 – SK Neptun (Peter Edvardsson, Fredrik Seidevall, Stefano Prestinoni & Johan Wallberg)
- 2002 – Södertörns SS (Jesper Levander, Johan Levander, Stefan Nystrand & Mikael E. Rosén)
- 2003 – Södertörns SS (Jesper Levander, Mikael Larsson, Stefan Nystrand & Mikael E. Rosén)
- 2004 – Malmö KK (Hannes Kohnke, Jonas Persson, Max von Bodungen & Martin Gustavsson)
- 2005 – Södertörns SS (Jesper Levander, Simon Sjödin, Stefan Nystrand & Mikael E. Rosén)
- 2006 – Linköpings ASS (Erik Andersson, Lars Frölander, Marcus Piehl & Kristofer Johansson)
- 2007 – SK Neptun (Petter Stymne, Stefan Nystrand, Peter Edvardsson & Simon Sjödin)
- 2008 – SK Neptun (Radovan Siljevski, Simon Sjödin, Simon Frank & Peter Edvardsson)
- 2009 – SK Neptun (Simon Sjödin, Radovan Siljevski, Christoffer Vikström & Peter Edvardsson)
- 2010 – Helsingborgs S (Kristian Kron, Henrik Sjöholm, Rickard Vagerstam & Gustav Åberg Lejdström)
- 2011 – SK Neptun (Radovan Siljevski, Petter Stymne, Peter Edvardsson & Simon Sjödin)
- 2012 – Helsingborgs S (Oskar Nordstrand, Gustav Åberg Lejdström, Daniel Lundahl & Kristian Kron)
- 2013 – Mölndals ASS (Isak Eliasson, Christoffer Carlsen, Patrik Löfgren & Robin Andréasson)
- 2014 – Mölndals ASS (Isak Eliasson, Christoffer Carlsen, Filip Holmqvist & Robin Andréasson)
- 2015 – Helsingborgs S (Jonas Holmström, Christoffer Carlsen, Isak Eliasson & Kristian Kron)
- 2016 – Helsingborgs S (Christoffer Carlsen, Jesper Björk, Kristian Kron & Jonas Holmström)
- 2017 – Helsingborgs S (Jonas Holmström, Kristian Kron, Jesper Björk & Christoffer Carlsen)
- 2018 – Helsingborgs S (Jonas Holmström, Johan Rydahl, Jesper Björk & Christoffer Carlsen)
- 2019 – SK Neptun (Wiggo Frohde, Simon Sjödin, Kristian Kron & Olle Sköld)
- 2021 – SK Neptun (Tim Rogersson, Simon Sjödin, Gustav Hökfelt & Olle Sköld)
- 2022 – Spårvägens SF (Isak Eliasson, Rasmus Hanson, Adam Karlsson & Samuel Törnqvist)

=== 4 × 50 metre medley relay ===
- 1994 – Södertälje SS (Marcus Lundstedt, Peter Haraldsson, Jonas Åkesson & Patric Robertsson)
- 1995 – Södertälje SS (Marcus Lundstedt, Patric Robertsson, Jonas Åkesson & Anders Bladh)
- 1996 – Sundsvalls SS (Tobias Marklund, Jens Johansson, Niklas Åhlin & Magnus Frölander)
- 1997 – Spårvägens SF (Mattias Egmar, Peter Aronsson, Jonas Åkesson & Fredrik Letzler)
- 1998 – Spårvägens SF (Tobias Marklund, Peter Aronsson, Jonas Åkesson & Fredrik Letzler)
- 1999 – Väsby SS (Daniel Carlsson, Erik Brannestål, Jan Karlsson & Anders Jönsson)
- 2000 – Malmö KK (Fredrik Engdahl, Martin Gustavsson, Andreas Lentonsson & Nicklas Svensson)
- 2001 – Sundsvalls SS (Daniel Lönnberg, Jens Johansson, Lars Frölander & Johan Nyström)
- 2002 – SK Neptun (Peter Segerlund, Andreas Eriksson, Tero Välimaa & Johan Norling)
- 2003 – Linköpings ASS (Rickard Piehl, Jakob Dorch, Lars Frölander & Marcus Piehl)
- 2004 – Linköpings ASS (Rickard Piehl, Jakob Dorch, Erik Dorch & Marcus Piehl)
- 2005 – Linköpings ASS (Marcus Piehl, Jakob Dorch, Filip Lundeholm & Erik Dorch)
- 2006 – Linköpings ASS (Marcus Piehl, Jakob Dorch, Lars Frölander & Erik Dorch)
- 2007 – SK Neptun (Simon Sjödin, Christer Tour, Stefan Nystrand & Petter Stymne)
- 2008 – SK Neptun (Simon Sjödin, Niklas Tour, Radovan Siljevski & Stefan Nystrand)
- 2009 – SK Neptun (Simon Sjödin, Jonas Andersson, Petter Stymne & Stefan Nystrand)
- 2010 – SK Neptun (Simon Sjödin, Stefan Nystrand, Pontus Flodqvist & Petter Stymne)
- 2011 – SK Neptun (Simon Sjödin, Niklas Tour, Pontus Flodqvist & Petter Stymne)
- 2012 – SK Neptun (Simon Sjödin, Niklas Tour, Pontus Flodqvist & Sebastian Wikström)
- 2013 – SK Neptun (Sebastian Holmberg, Niklas Tour, Linus Magnusson & Petter Stymne)
- 2014 – SK Neptun (Alexander Nyström, Simon Sjödin, Jacob Thulin & Linus Magnusson)
- 2015 – SK Neptun (Alexander Nyström, Niklas Tour, Simon Sjödin & Linus Magnusson)
- 2016 – SK Neptun (Alexander Nyström, Niklas Tour, Simon Sjödin & Petter Stymne)
- 2017 – Helsingborgs S (Jesper Björk, Erik Kähr, Christoffer Carlsen & Jonas Holmström)
- 2018 – SK Neptun (Simon Sjödin, Johannes Skagius, Sebastian Holmberg & Linus Magnusson)
- 2019 – SK Neptun (Gustav Hökfelt, Johannes Skagius, Simon Sjödin & Olle Sköld)
- 2021 – SK Neptun (Gustav Hökfelt, Johannes Skagius, Pontus Flodqvist & Olle Sköld)
- 2022 – SK Neptun (Simon Sjödin, Erik Kähr, Jesper Jonsson & Tim Rogersson)

=== 4 × 100 metre medley relay ===
- 1968 – Sundsvalls SS
- 1969 – Stockholmspolisens IF (Bo Westergren, Anders Gustavsson, Leif Swärd & Jan Lundin)
- 1970 – Simavdelningen 1902
- 1971 – Timrå AIF
- 1972 – Timrå AIF
- 1973 – SKK-Spårvägen
- 1974 – Simavdelningen 1902
- 1975 – Simavdelningen 1902
- 1976 – Stockholmspolisens IF
- 1977 – Stockholmspolisens IF
- 1978 – Stockholmspolisens IF
- 1979 – Finspångs SK (Bengt Baron, Björn Larsson, Pär Arvidsson & Freddy Heinefeldt)
- 1980 – Kristianstads SLS
- 1981 – SK Korrugal (Bengt Baron, Tommy Pettersson, Pär Arvidsson & Anders Nordström)
- 1982 – Stockholmspolisens IF
- 1983 – SK Korrugal (Bengt Baron, Tommy Pettersson, Pär Arvidsson & Anders Nordström)
- 1984 – SK Korrugal (Bengt Baron, Tommy Pettersson, Pär Arvidsson & Anders Nordström)
- 1985 – Upsala S
- 1986 – Örebro Simallians
- 1987 – Helsingborgs S (Nils Liedberg, Ola Lundblad, Anders Rasmusson & Viktor Olsson)
- 1988 – Stockholmspolisens IF
- 1989 – Stockholmspolisens IF (Niklas Håkansson, Rickard Wendelius, Stefan Pärlklo & Joakim Sjöholm)
- 1990 – Stockholmspolisens IF
- 1991 – Upsala S (Anders Peterson, Jan Stensson, Kenneth Nyman & Lars-Ove Jansson)
- 1992 – Karlskrona SS
- 1993 – Södertälje SS (Marcus Lundstedt, Peter Haraldsson, Jonas Åkesson & Patric Robertsson)
- 1994 – Spårvägens SF
- 1995 – Växjö SS
- 1996 – Sundsvalls SS (Tobias Marklund, Jens Johansson, Niklas Åhlin & Johan Nyström)
- 1997 – Sundsvalls SS (Tobias Marklund, Jens Johansson, Johan Nyström & Niclas Öhman)
- 1998 – Spårvägens SF (Tobias Marklund, Peter Aronsson, Jonas Åkesson & Fredrik Letzler)
- 1999 – Sundsvalls SS (Niklas Åhlin, Jens Johansson, Lars Frölander & Johan Nyström)
- 2000 – Sundsvalls SS (Daniel Lönnberg, Johan Nyström, Lars Frölander & Johan Backlund)
- 2001 – Sundsvalls SS (Daniel Lönnberg, Jens Johansson, Lars Frölander & Johan Backlund)
- 2002 – SK Neptun (Peter Segerlund, Andreas Eriksson, Tero Välimaa & Marcus Andersson)
- 2003 – Linköpings ASS (Rickard Piehl, Jakob Dorch, Lars Frölander & Marcus Piehl)
- 2004 – Malmö KK (Sten-Olof Gustafsson, Martin Gustavsson, Andreas Lentonsson & Jonas Persson)
- 2005 – Linköpings ASS (Marcus Piehl, Jakob Dorch, Filip Lundeholm & Erik Dorch)
- 2006 – Linköpings ASS (Erik Andersson, Jakob Dorch, Lars Frölander & Marcus Piehl)
- 2007 – SK Neptun (Simon Sjödin, Christer Tour, Stefan Nystrand & Petter Stymne)
- 2008 – SK Neptun (Simon Sjödin, Niklas Tour, Radovan Siljevski & Stefan Nystrand)
- 2009 – SK Neptun (Simon Sjödin, Niklas Tour, Petter Stymne & Stefan Nystrand)
- 2010 – SK Neptun (Simon Sjödin, Niklas Tour, Pontus Flodqvist & Stefan Nystrand)
- 2011 – Linköpings ASS (Pontus Palmqvist, Jakob Dorch, Lars Frölander & Oscar Ekström)
- 2012 – SK Neptun (Simon Sjödin, Niklas Tour, Alexander Nyström & Christoffer Vikström)
- 2013 – SK Neptun (Alexander Nyström, Niklas Tour, Simon Sjödin & Petter Stymne)
- 2014 – SK Neptun (Alexander Nyström, Simon Sjödin, Jacob Thulin & Sebastian Holmberg)
- 2015 – SK Neptun (Alexander Nyström, Niklas Tour, Simon Sjödin & Linus Magnusson)
- 2016 – SK Neptun (Alexander Nyström, Patric Ridell, Simon Sjödin & Petter Stymne)
- 2017 – Helsingborgs S (Kristian Kron, Erik Kähr, Jesper Björk & Christoffer Carlsen)
- 2018 – SK Neptun (Fabian Bergman, Johannes Skagius, Simon Sjödin & Sebastian Holmberg)
- 2019 – SK Neptun (Gustav Hökfelt, Johannes Skagius, Simon Sjödin & Olle Sköld)
- 2021 – SK Neptun (Gustav Hökfelt, Johannes Skagius, Simon Sjödin & Olle Sköld)
- 2022 – Spårvägens SF (Samuel Törnqvist, David Kaspervik, Jonathan Kling & Isak Eliasson)

== Discontinued events ==
=== 4 × 100 metre backstroke relay ===
- 1961 – Skellefteå-Rönnskärs SK (Gunnar Bergengren, Torsten Born, Bengt Furberg & Peter Bergengren)
- 1962 – Skellefteå-Rönnskärs SK (Torsten Born, Gunnar Bergengren, Bengt Furberg & Peter Bergengren)
- 1963 – Stockholmspolisens IF
- 1964 – SK Neptun
- 1965 – Stockholmspolisens IF
- 1966 – Sundsvalls SS
- 1967 – Stockholmspolisens IF

=== 4 × 100 metre breaststroke relay ===
- 1961 – Stockholmspolisens IF (Tommie Lindström, Hans Bolkéus, Jonnie Lindström & Lennart Fröstad)
- 1962 – Stockholmspolisens IF (Ronny Svensson, Jonnie Lindström, Lennart Fröstad & Tommie Lindström)
- 1963 – SK Ran
- 1964 – SK Ran
- 1965 – SK Ran
- 1966 – Stockholmspolisens IF
- 1967 – Stockholmspolisens IF

=== 4 × 100 metre butterfly relay ===
- 1961 – Stockholmspolisens IF (Bo Hansson, Jan Lindhroth, Jan Lundin & Håkan Bengtsson)
- 1962 – Stockholmspolisens IF (Jan Lundin, Knut Leijon, Bo Larsson & Håkan Bengtsson)
- 1963 – Stockholmspolisens IF
- 1964 – Stockholmspolisens IF
- 1965 – Stockholmspolisens IF
- 1966 – Simavdelningen 1902
- 1967 – Stockholmspolisens IF
