= Erik Andersson (swimmer, born 1984) =

Swedish swimmer

Personal information
- Full name: Erik Tony Emanuel Andersson
- Born: 10 September 1984 (age 41) Trollhättan, Sweden

Sport
- Sport: Swimming
Medal record
Representing Sweden
European Championships (SC)
Bronze medal – third place	2004 Vienna	4x50m freestyle relay

Erik Tony Emanuel Andersson (born 10 September 1984) is a butterfly, freestyle and medley swimmer from Sweden currently representing Linköpings ASS.

Andersson was born in Trollhättan and started his career in Trollhättans SS, but moved to Linköping and Linköpings ASS to study at the Linköping University. Andersson participated in the 2004 Summer Olympics in Athens finishing 32nd on the 100 m butterfly. He also has bronze medal on 4x50 m freestyle relay from the European SC Championships 2004 in Vienna together with David Nordenlilja, Marcus Piehl, and Petter Stymne.

== Personal bests ==
=== Long course (50 m) ===
Event	Time	Date	Meet	Location	Ref
100 m freestyle	50.20	3 Apr 2004	Swedish Grand Prix	Stockholm, Sweden	
200 m freestyle	1:51.52	17 Jun 2006	Meeting Internacional do Porto	Porto, Portugal	
50 m butterfly	24.48	18 Jul 2008	Swedish Championships	Norrköping, Sweden	
100 m butterfly	53.69	4 Apr 2004	Swedish Grand Prix	Stockholm, Sweden	

Legend: WR – World record; ER – European record; NR – Swedish record;
Records not set in finals: h – heat; sf – semifinal; r – relay 1st leg; rh – relay heat 1st leg; b – B final; † – en route to final mark; so – swim-off; tt – time trial

=== Short course (25 m) ===
Event	Time	Date	Meet	Location	Ref
100 m freestyle	48.93	19 Feb 2005	West Swedish Regional SC Championships	Gothenburg, Sweden	
200 m freestyle	1:45.76	13 Mar 2005	Swedish SC Championships	Gothenburg, Sweden	
50 m butterfly	23.85	26 Nov 2009	Swedish SC Championships	Gothenburg, Sweden	
100 m butterfly	51.90	26 Nov 2009	Swedish SC Championships	Gothenburg, Sweden	
100 m individual medley	55.72	19 Feb 2005	West Swedish Regional SC Championships	Gothenburg, Sweden	

Legend: WR – World record; ER – European record; NR – Swedish record;
Records not set in finals: h – heat; sf – semifinal; r – relay 1st leg; rh – relay heat 1st leg; b – B final; † – en route to final mark; so – swim-off; tt – time trial

== Clubs ==
- Trollhättans SS (-2005, 2005–2006)
- Göteborg Sim (2005)
- Linköpings ASS (2006-)
