= Mellberg =

Mellberg may refer to:

- Bror Mellberg (1923–2004), Swedish footballer
- Olof Mellberg (born 1977), Swedish footballer

== See also ==
- Mollberg, a surname
