= Upsala Simsällskap =

Swedish swimming club

Upsala S

Club information
- Full name: Upsala Simsällskap
- Short name: US
- City: Uppsala
- Founded: 1796; 229 years ago
- Home pool(s): Fyrishov

Upsala Simsällskap is a Swedish swimming club based in Uppsala and founded there in 1796, making it the oldest existing sports club in Sweden. It claims to be the oldest swimming club in the world. Since 1991, Fyrishov is the home pool of Upsala SS.

== History ==
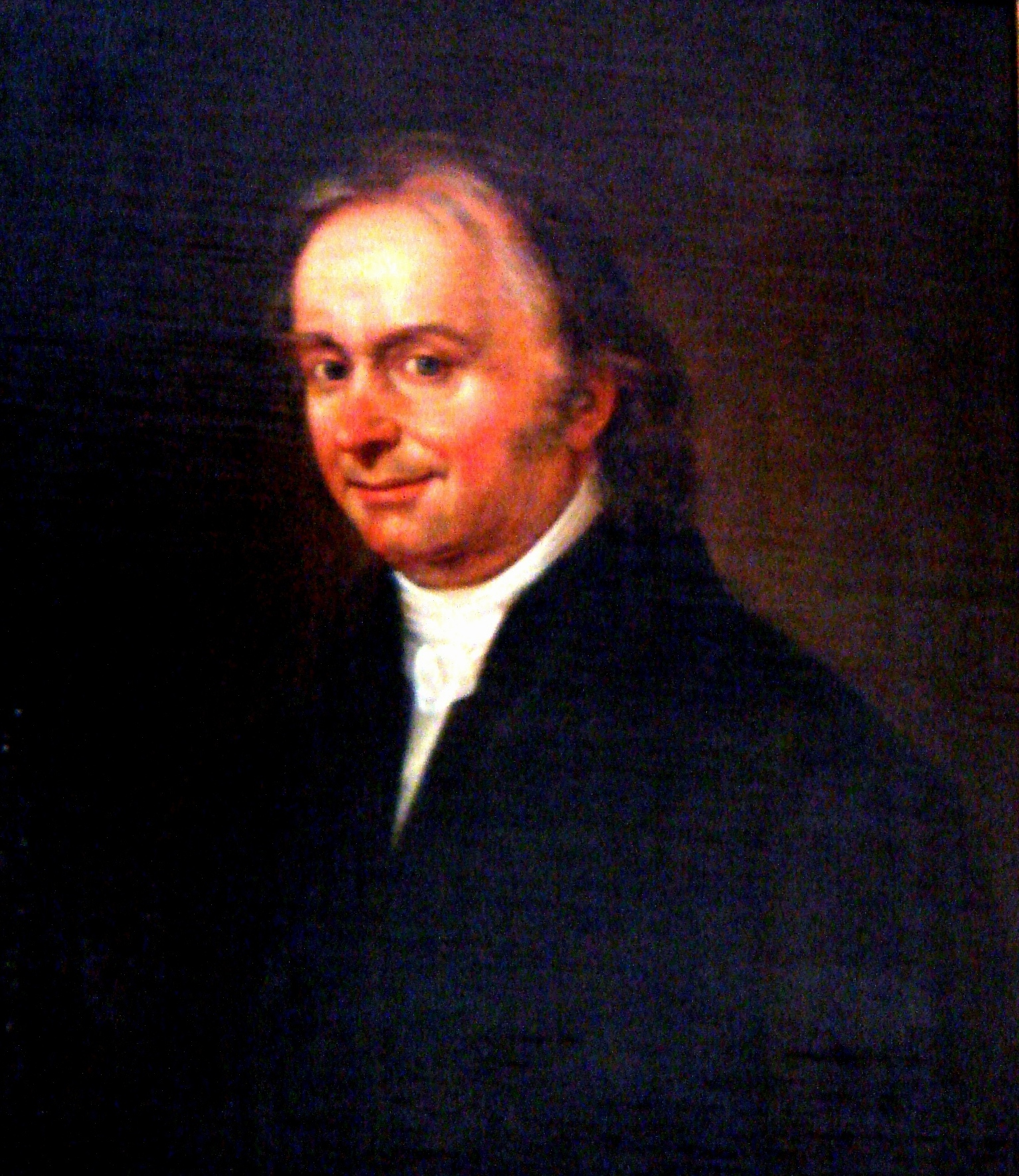
Jöns Svanberg, founder of Upsala Simsällskap

The society was founded by the mathematician and astronomer Jöns Svanberg (1771–1851) together with some colleagues at the university as a way to remedy the general lack of swimming skills. The same year the society was founded, Svanberg arranged a mock "graduation ceremony" (promotion), modelled after the academic ceremony, where he and some of his colleagues awarded themselves the master's degree (magister) and their pupils the degree of bachelor (kandidat) in swimming. The simpromotion and these "degrees" were taken over by other Swedish swimming clubs and are still used in Swedish swimming schools.

After Svanberg had temporarily left Uppsala for Stockholm, Gabriel Marklin, otherwise remembered as an eccentric scientific collector, briefly took care of the swimming school, to be succeeded for a few years by Carl Gustaf Grahl, the first professional swimming instructor in Sweden. By that time, Svanberg had returned to Uppsala as professor of mathematics.

In the middle of the 19th century, a bath house was built and later a springboard for diving. The Isander dive (or half gainer), one of the most common dives in springboard diving, was named after Lars Fredrik Isander (1828–1893), active in the Society and later lecturer at the Gymnasium in Linköping, and the Mollberg dive (full gainer) was named after Anders Fredrik Mollberg, swimming instructor for the society (1878–1879), who supposedly invented it by accident when he was actually intending to do an Isander dive. It actually appears to be considerably older and is described already in Underrättelser i simkonsten, a Swedish instruction book in swimming from 1839. Anecdotes describe Mollberg's extraordinary gymnastic ability and how he once made two consecutive "Mollberg" dives while slightly tipsy, leaving spectators wondering how he came out of the water alive.

Upsala S had their first Olympic diver at the 1906 Summer Olympics, when Otto Hagborg participated. In 1910, Upsala Simsällskap entered competitive swimming and is one of the most successful swimming clubs in Sweden. Upsala S had their first Olympic swimmer at the 1960 Summer Olympics, when Inger Thorngren participated.

== Athletes ==
=== Swimmers ===
Swimmers that have participated in the Summer Olympics while representing Upsala SS:

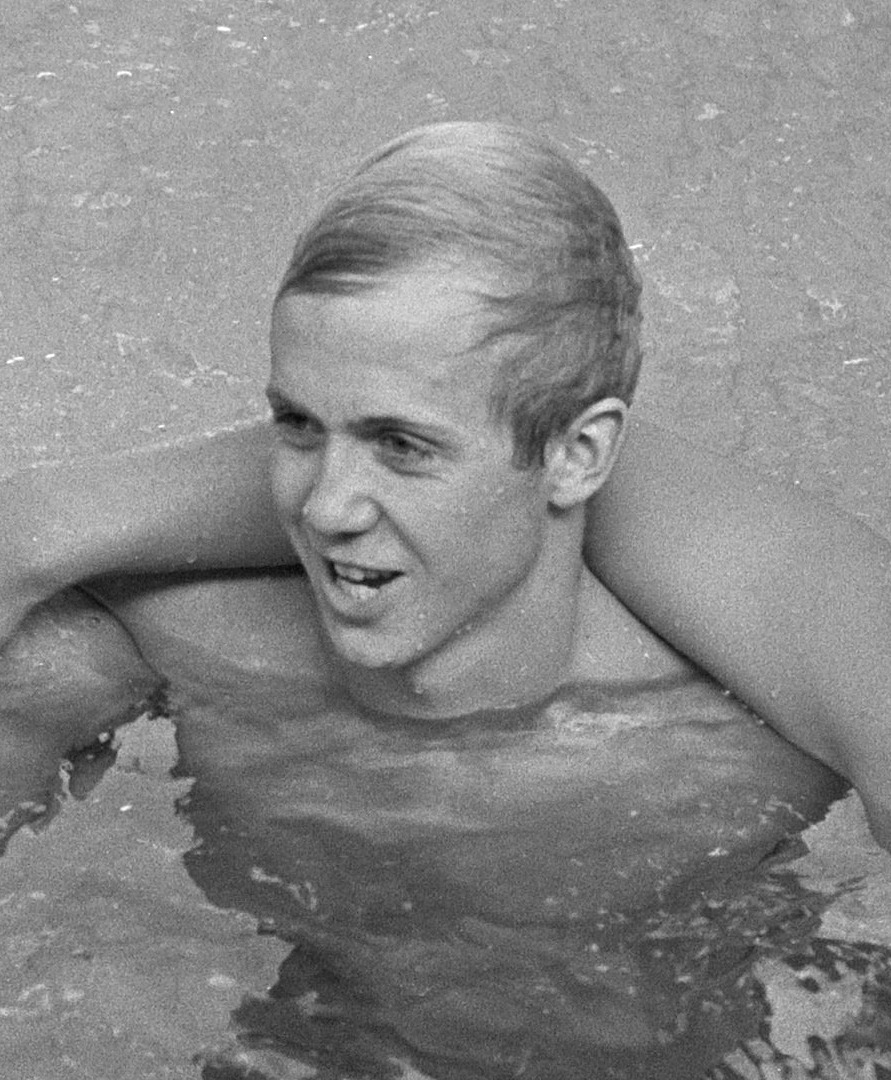
Upsala S swimmer Anders Bellbring

- Anders Bellbring
- Leif Ericsson
- Jennie Johansson
- Per-Alvar Magnusson
- Rikard Milton
- Rolf Pettersson
- Inger Thorngren
- Christoffer Wikström

=== Divers ===
Divers that have participated in the Summer Olympics while representing Upsala SS:

- Eskil Brodd
