= Jonas Persson (swimmer) =

Swedish swimmer

Personal information
- Full name: Jonas Lars Persson
- Nationality: Sweden
- Born: 15 December 1983 (age 42) Malmö, Sweden
- Height: 1.94 m (6 ft 4 in)

Sport
- Sport: Swimming
- Strokes: Freestyle
- Club: Malmö KK
- College team: Arizona Wildcats (2004-06); Tennessee Volunteers (2006-2009)
Medal record
European Championships
| Gold medal – first place | 2008 Eindhoven | 4×100 free relay |
| Bronze medal – third place | 2010 Budapest | 4×100 m freestyle |

Jonas Lars Persson (born 15 December 1983) is an Olympic swimmer from Sweden. He swam for his homeland at the 2008 Olympics.

== Biography ==
Persson was born 15 December 1983 in Slottstaden in Malmö, to Lars and Ingegerd Persson.

In 2002, Jonas Persson won his first individual title in the Swedish Swimming Championships, on 200 m freestyle, after having won a silver in the Swedish Short Course Swimming Championships earlier the same year.

Persson swam and attended school at the USA's University of Arizona for two years (2004–06), and more recently was at the University of Tennessee (2006–09), where he majored in Marketing and International Business.

At the 2008 European Championships, he swam the anchor leg of Sweden's winning 4×100 m freestyle relay; also on the relay were Marcus Piehl, Stefan Nystrand and Petter Stymne.

Persson also participated in the 2008 Summer Olympics for Sweden in the 100 m freestyle, 4 × 100 m freestyle relay and the 4×100 medley relay. He finished 13th in the 100 m freestyle and 5th in the 4×100 freestyle relay, alongside Petter Stymne, Lars Frölander and Stefan Nystrand. The medley relay team consisting of Simon Sjödin, Jonas Andersson, Frölander and Persson finished 11th in the prelims.

Persson has been a key member of the Swedish 4 × 100 m freestyle relay teams during the late 2000s, but missed the 2009 World Aquatics Championships in Rome because of an injured shoulder.

Persson was the assistant coach for the University of Utah Swimming & Diving Team until May 2016.

Persson coached at the University of Toledo from 2016-2019 and is now the assistant coach at the University of Utah

Persson was named head coach for the University of Utah Swimming and Dive Team in May 2022
