= Holmertz =

Holmertz is a surname. Notable people with the surname include:

- Anders Holmertz (born 1968), Swedish swimmer
- Mikael Holmertz (born 1965), Swedish swimmer, brother of Anders
- Per Holmertz (born 1960), Swedish swimmer
