= Thomas Lejdström =

Swedish swimmer

Personal information
- Full name: Leif Thomas Lejdström
- Nickname: Lejan
- Nationality: Swedish
- Born: 31 May 1962 (age 64) Västerås, Västmanland, Sweden
- Height: 1.89 m (6 ft 2 in)
- Weight: 79 kg (174 lb)

Sport
- Sport: Swimming
- Strokes: Freestyle and medley
- Club: Västerås SS, Västerås (SWE)
- College team: University of California, Berkeley
- Coach: Nort Thornton Jr. (U. Cal. Berkeley)
Medal record
Men's swimming
Representing Sweden
Olympic Games
Bronze medal – third place	1984 Los Angeles	4×100 m freestyle
European Championships (LC)
Silver medal – second place	1983 Rome	4×100 m freestyle
Bronze medal – third place	1981 Split	200 m freestyle
Bronze medal – third place	1981 Split	4×200 m freestyle

Thomas Lejdström (born 31 May 1962) is a former Swedish freestyle and medley swimmer, who competed for the University of California Berkeley. He competed in the 1980 Summer Olympics and won a bronze medal in the 4x100-freestyle relay at the 1984 Summer Olympics.

Lejdstrom attended University of California Berkeley and swam for Hall of Fame Coach Nort Thornton.

== 1980-84 Olympics ==
Nicknamed Lejan, Lejdström's best individual result at the 1980 Olympics was a 7th place in the 200-m freestyle.

In the 1984 Olympics, Lejdström won a bronze medal in 4×100-m freestyle relay along with Swedish teammates Bengt Baron, Mikael Örn and Per Johansson. Both Bron and Johansson had swum as teammates with Lejdstrom at the University of California Berkeley. Their relay team's combined time of 3:22.69 was three seconds behind the powerful Australian team that won the silver medal, which had followed close on the heels of the gold medal winning American team. Mat Biondi, on the winning American relay team had also swum under Nort Thornton at the University of California Berkeley. Biondi would become one of the most successful Olympic male swimmers of the decade.

Lejdström won two bronze medals at the 1981 Split European Aquatics Championships, and a silver in the 4x100-freestyle relay at the 1983 Rome European Aquatics Championships.

He is the father of the Swedish Youth Olympics swimmer Gustav Åberg Lejdström.

== Personal bests ==
=== Long course (50 m) ===
Event	Time		Date	Meet	Location	Ref
100 m freestyle	50.90		25 August 1983	European Championships	Rome, Italy	
200 m freestyle	1:51.22		23 August 1983	European Championships	Rome, Italy	
400 m freestyle	3:55.30		16 July 1982	Swedish Championships	Stockholm, Sweden	
800 m freestyle	8:20.61	†	20 April 1980	-	Blackpool, Great Britain	
1500 m freestyle	15:38.91		20 April 1980	-	Blackpool, Great Britain	
100 m butterfly	55.48		4 July 1984	Swedish Championships	Västerås, Sweden	
200 m butterfly	2:01.70		6 July 1984	Swedish Championships	Västerås, Sweden	
400 m individual medley	4:29.28		1 August 1982	-	Ronneby, Sweden	

Legend: WR – World record; ER – European record; NR – Swedish record;
Records not set in finals: h – heat; sf – semifinal; r – relay 1st leg; rh – relay heat 1st leg; b – B final; † – en route to final mark; so – swim-off; tt – time trial
