= Bo Larsson (water polo) =

Swedish water polo player

Personal information
- Nationality: Swedish
- Born: 7 September 1927; Hallstadhammar, Sweden
- Died: 29 November 1977 (aged 50); Västmanland, Sweden

Sport
- Sport: Water polo

Bo Melker Larsson (7 September 1927 – 29 November 1977) was a Swedish water polo player. He competed in the men's tournament at the 1952 Summer Olympics.

At club level, Larsson represented Västerås SS.
