= Emelie Fast =

Swedish swimmer (born 2004)

Personal information
- Full name: Emelie Linnea Fast
- Nationality: Swedish
- Born: 20 February 2004 (age 22) Solna, Sweden

Sport
- Sport: Swimming
- Club: Södertörns SS
Medal record
Women's swimming
Representing Sweden
World Championships (SC)
Gold medal – first place	2021 Abu Dhabi	4×50 m medley
Gold medal – first place	2021 Abu Dhabi	4×100 m medley
European Championships (SC)
Silver medal – second place	2021 Kazan	4×50 m medley

Emelie Linnea Fast (born 20 February 2004) is a Swedish Olympic breaststroke swimmer. She is representing Södertörns SS.

== Career ==
Emilie Fast was born in Solna. She won the 50 metre breaststroke event at the 2018 Swedish Short Course Swimming Championships, representing Södertörns SS.

In 2021, she competed in the women's 200 metre breaststroke event at the 2020 European Aquatics Championships, in Budapest, Hungary. At the championship, she swam below the Swedish Olympic Committee trial time for the 2020 Summer Olympics, making her able for selection from their side.

Later in 2021, she represented Sweden at the 2020 Summer Olympics held in Tokyo, Japan. She competed in the women's 100 metre breaststroke event. She competed at the 2021 FINA World Swimming Championships (25 m).
