= Nort Thornton =

American swimming, diving and water polo coach (1933–2021)

Biographical details
- Born: 1933
- Died: April 21, 2021 (aged 87)
- Education: San Jose State University (1956); Stanford University

Coaching career (HC unless noted)
- 1956–1960: Los Altos HS (CA)
- 1960–1974: Foothill
- 1974–2007: University of California, Berkeley

Head coaching record
- Overall: 231–85 (college)

Accomplishments and honors

Championships
- 2 NCAA Division I (1979, 1980); 8 national junior college 4 Northern CIF (1957–1960)

Awards
- International Swimming Hall of Fame (1995); Cal Athletics Hall of Fame (2010); 4× Pac-10 Coach of the Year

Norton Thornton Jr. (1933 – April 21, 2021) was the head coach of the California Golden Bears men's swimming and diving team at the University of California, Berkeley from 1974 through 2007, where he led the team to NCAA national championships in 1979 and 1980. Formerly, he coached Northern California's Los Altos High School, Los Altos Swim Club and Foothill Junior College, leading them to national recognition from 1956 through 1974.

== Early life and education ==
Born in 1933, Thornton competed in water polo and swimming for San Jose State University, earning a bachelor's degree in Physical Education in 1956. He later went on to earn a Master's degree in Education from Stanford University.

== Coaching career ==
Thornton began his career around 1956 in Los Altos, California, coaching swimming at Los Altos High School, where under his direction the team broke 13 national records out of 20, and won four straight Northern CIF titles by 1960.

=== Foothill ===
From 1960 to 1974, Thornton coached at Foothill College, where the team became one of the most highly rated junior college swim programs in the United States. Inheriting a team that had great potential, by his 1962 season, Thornton had eight team members with All-American honors in the prep school league, and two that had been on the Junior College All-America team in the 1961 season. At Foothill, he led his teams to eight national swimming titles, and five state Junior College championships in water polo.

In 1960, he founded Foothill Aquatic Club, which he coached through 1974, when it was renamed the Los Altos Mountain View Aquatic Club. By 1960, Thornton had produced national championship and Olympic swimmers. He left Foothill Aquatic club in 1974 to help coach University of California's Concord Swim Club, formerly coached by Pete Cutino.

=== Outstanding swimmers prior to 1974 ===
Outstanding swimmers coached by Thornton before he began at Berkeley included 1960 and 1964 Olympian Steve Clark, 100-meter freestyle record holder, Gary Ilman, a '64 Olympic medalist in the 100 freestyle who swam for Foothill Junior College, and Canadian Ralph Hutton, a three-time Olympic finalist. Thornton also trained European champions from Sweden, Peter Fiel and Ingmar Ericksson. Australian swimmer and 1972 Olympic triple gold medalist Shane Gould trained at the Foothill Aquatic Club during High School.

=== University of California, Berkeley ===
Thornton became head coach of the men's swimming and diving team at the University of California, Berkeley, in 1974 and remained for 33 seasons, retiring and becoming Head Coach Emeritus in 2007, when he became the longest-tenured coach at the university. In his early years with Berkeley, he helped with the Water Polo team, and the Concord Swim Club, coached by Cal's Pete Cutino.

The Berkeley team's record in dual meets during his tenure was 231-85. They won NCAA Championships in 1979 and 1980, and were ranked in the top 10 in national polls in 28 seasons. During his tenure, members of the team won 48 individual and relay NCAA championships and 108 Pac-10 individual, relay and diving championships, Forty-eight of his swimmers competed in the Olympics, winning 14 gold, 10 silver and 5 bronze medals; two others won one gold and one silver medal after his retirement. The only previous Olympic medal won by a University of California, Berkeley swimmer was Ludy Langer's silver at the 1920 Olympics. Thornton pioneered recruitment of international athletes, and was also known for embracing new technology and methodologies. He was involved in recruiting Dave Durden as a Cal swimming coach who would continue his legacy beginning in 2007.

=== Outstanding swimmers coached ===
Outstanding Olympians coached by Thornton included U.S. team member Peter Rocca, and Swedish Olympic team freestylers Bengt Baron, Pelle Holmertz, Par Arvidsson, and Thomas Lejdstrom and freestyle sprinter and 1992 Olympic gold medalist Joel Thomas. He coached Canadian Olympian Graham Smith. Thornton coached 1984 Los Angeles 400 freestyle Silver Medalist John Mykkanen at Cal Berkeley. More recently, he worked with Patrick O'Neil, who won the 200-yard butterfly at the 2007 NCAA Championships. Among other more recent Olympians, he coached world record holder Matt Biondi at Cal, and Anthony Ervin, who won the gold medal in the 50-meter freestyle at the 2000 Sydney Olympics. Thornton coached Sean Killion at Cal Berkeley, a 1992 Barcelona Olympic participant in the 400 and 1500-meter freestyle and an American record holder in the 800-meter freestyle. He coached Duje Draganja, who took silver in the 50-meter free at the 2004 Athens Olympics.

=== International competition ===
In international competition, Thornton coached United States swimming teams at the 1979 FINA Synchronised Swimming World Cup and the 1981 World University Games. He was a coach for the United States team at the 1992 Summer Olympics and an assistant coach at the 1983 Pan American Games, the 1986 FINA World Championships, the 1991 Pan Pacific Championships, and the 1998 FINA World Championships. He served as president of the American Swimming Coaches Association and on its board of directors, and was a member of the NCAA Rules Committee.

== Awards ==
Thornton was twice voted National Coach of the Year, and four times Pac-10 coach of the year. He received the National Collegiate and Scholastic Award and was inducted into the International Swimming Hall of Fame in 1995 and the Cal Athletics Hall of Fame in 2010.

== Personal life and death ==
Thornton and his wife, Carla, had three children. His son Richard Thornton, who swam for him at Berkeley, was a founder and long serving coach for the San Ramon Valley Swim Club, an Olympic Swim team member in 1980, and a national team coach. Richard died in January 2024, in a drowning accident after suffering from multiple myloma, a blood disease.

Nort Thornton died on April 22, 2021, aged 87, after being hospitalized with heart disease.

== See also ==
- List of members of the International Swimming Hall of Fame
