= Daniel Carlsson (swimmer) =

Swedish swimmer (born 1976)

Personal information
- Full name: Daniel Carlsson
- Nationality: Sweden
- Born: 14 November 1976 (age 49) Norsborg, Sweden

Sport
- Sport: Swimming
- Strokes: butterfly, backstroke
Medal record
Men's swimming
Representing Sweden
Event	1st	2nd	3rd
World Championships (SC)	0	1	1
European Championships (SC)	3	0	1
Total	3	1	2
World Championships (SC)
Silver medal – second place	1999 Hong Kong	4×100 m medley
Bronze medal – third place	1999 Hong Kong	4×100 m freestyle
European Championships (SC)
Gold medal – first place	1998 Sheffield	4×50 m medley
Gold medal – first place	1999 Lisbon	4×50 m freestyle
Gold medal – first place	1999 Lisbon	4×50 m medley
Bronze medal – third place	1998 Sheffield	50 m backstroke

Daniel Carlsson (born 14 November 1976) is a Swedish former swimmer, a European champion and World Championship medalist in relay events.

== Biography ==
Carlsson was born in Norsborg, Botkyrka Municipality in Sweden. He won a bronze medal in the 100 metres backstroke event at the 1991 European Youth Olympic Days.

He won gold medals in 4 × 50 m medley relay at the 1998 and 1999 European Short Course Swimming Championships (making a new world best time the first time) and 4 × 50 m freestyle at 1998. He won also a bronze medal in 50 m backstroke at 1998. He competed in the 2000 Summer Olympics, not advancing in the 100 metre butterfly or 4 × 100 metre medley events.

== Personal bests ==
=== Long course (50 m) ===
Event	Time	Date	Meet	Location	Ref
50 m butterfly	24.34	1 Jun 2000	Swedish Grand Prix	Jönköping, Sweden	
100 m butterfly	53.65	4 Jun 2000	Swedish Grand Prix	Jönköping, Sweden	

Legend: WR – World record; ER – European record; NR – Swedish record;
Records not set in finals: h – heat; sf – semifinal; r – relay 1st leg; rh – relay heat 1st leg; b – B final; † – en route to final mark; so – swim-off; tt – time trial

=== Short course (25 m) ===
Event	Time		Date	Meet	Location	Ref
50 m backstroke	24.53	(r)	13 Dec 1998	European SC Championships	Sheffield, United Kingdom	
50 m butterfly	22.78		2 Mar 2000	Swedish SC Championships	Stockholm, Sweden	
100 m butterfly	52.49		12 Dec 1999	European SC Championships	Lisbon, Portugal	

Legend: WR – World record; ER – European record; NR – Swedish record;
Records not set in finals: h – heat; sf – semifinal; r – relay 1st leg; rh – relay heat 1st leg; b – B final; † – en route to final mark; so – swim-off; tt – time trial

== Clubs ==
- Botkyrka-Rönninge SS (−1992)
- Väsby SS (1992–2003)
- Malmö KK (2005)
