= Kenth Karlsson =

Swedish water polo player

Personal information
- Nationality: Swedish
- Born: 21 December 1957 (age 67); Västerås, Sweden

Sport
- Sport: Water polo

Kenth Alvar Karlsson (born 21 December 1957) is a Swedish water polo player. He competed in the men's tournament at the 1980 Summer Olympics.

At club level, Karlsson represented Västerås SS.
