= Jimmy Sjödin =

Swedish diver

Jimmy Sjödin Huber
Personal information
- Full name: Johan Gustav Jimmy Sjödin Huber
- Nationality: Swedish
- Born: 1 December 1977 (age 48) Östersund, Jämtland, Sweden
- Education: University of Arizona

Sport
- Sport: Diving

Johan Gustav Jimmy Sjödin Huber (born 1 December 1977) is a former Swedish diver. Born in Östersund, he competed in the men's 3 metre springboard and 10 metre platform events at the 1996 Summer Olympics.

Sjödin represented Malmö KK.

Sjödin is openly gay, and, as of 2017, is married to Patrick Huber.
