= Lena Eriksson =

Swedish swimmer

Personal information
- Full name: Lena Christina Eriksson
- Born: 8 October 1972 (age 53) Järfälla, Stockholm, Sweden

Sport
- Sport: Swimming
- Strokes: Breaststroke
- Club: Spårvägens SF
Medal record
Representing Sweden
World Championships (SC)
Bronze medal – third place	1995 Rio de Janeiro	200m breaststroke

Lena Christina Eriksson (born 8 October 1972) is a former female breaststroke swimmer from Sweden, representing Spårvägens SF. She competed for her native country at the 1996 Summer Olympics in Atlanta, Georgia, where she ended up in ninth place in the Women's 200m Breaststroke.

== Clubs ==
- Spårvägens SF
