= Mikael Holmertz =

Swedish swimmer

Personal information
- Born: 1965 (age 60–61)

Sport
- Sport: Swimming
- Strokes: Butterfly

Mikael Holmertz (born 1965) is a former Swedish swimmer who specialised in butterfly and brother to Swedish Olympic silver medal winner Anders Holmertz. He won two national short course titles in 100 m butterfly representing Motala SS. After his active career he became head coach in Linköpings ASS and coaches Lars Frölander and Marcus Piehl.

== Clubs ==
- Motala SS
- Spårvägens SF
