= Stefan Persson (swimmer) =

Swedish swimmer

Personal information
- Born: February 3, 1967 (age 59) Malmö, Skåne, Sweden

Sport
- Sport: Swimming
- Club: Malmö KK

Jan Stefan Persson (born 3 February 1967) is a former freestyle swimmer from Sweden. His best result is a fourth place on 1500m Freestyle at the European LC Championships 1987 in Strasbourg.

Persson also held the Swedish record in 800m and 1500m Freestyle in short course as well as the 1500m Freestyle in long course (all three set in 1987), until they were beaten by Victor Johansson in 2014, 2016 and 2016 respectively.

Persson participated in the 1988 Summer Olympics in Seoul finishing 17th on the 1500m Freestyle. He was affiliated with the University of California, Berkeley in the United States.

== Clubs ==
- Malmö KK
