= Johan Wallberg =

Swedish swimmer

Personal information
- National team: Sweden
- Born: 18 March 1977 (age 49) Karlsborg, Sweden

Sport
- Sport: Swimming

Johan Mikael Wallberg (born 18 March 1977 in Karlsborg, Sweden) is a former freestyle swimmer from Sweden. He competed twice at the Summer Olympics for his native country, in 1996 and 2000, both in the Men's 4 × 100 m freestyle relay. After his active career he became coach for Swedish swimmer Therese Alshammar. During the autumn of 2016, he became coach for Sarah Sjöström.

== Clubs ==
- SK Neptun
- Täby Sim
