= Anders Norling =

Swedish swimmer

Personal information
- Full name: Ulf Anders Norling
- Born: 15 March 1956 (age 70) Stockholm, Sweden

Sport
- Sport: Swimming
- Club: Stockholmspolisens IF

Ulf Anders Norling (born 15 March 1956) is a Swedish former breaststroke swimmer. He competed in three events at the 1976 Summer Olympics.

Norling represented Stockholmspolisens IF.
