= Radovan Siljevski =

Serbian swimmer

Personal information
- Nationality: Serbia
- Born: 17 July 1986 (age 38); Belgrade, Serbia, Yugoslavia
- Height: 1.90 m (6 ft 3 in)
- Weight: 80 kg (176 lb)

Sport
- Sport: Swimming
- Strokes: Freestyle
- Club: Vojvodina Novi Sad

Radovan Siljevski (Serbian Cyrillic: Радован Сиљевски, born 17 July 1986 in Belgrade) is a Serbian swimmer who competed at the 2008 Olympic Games in Beijing and the 2012 Summer Olympics for his native country. He has also competed at six consecutive SC European Championships (Trieste 2005, Helsinki 2006, Debrecen 2007, Rijeka 2008, Istanbul 2009 and Eindhoven 2010, he also competed at Chartres 2012, Herning 2013), as well as the University Games in Bangkok in 2007 and Belgrade 2009.

He swims for Serbian Club P.K. Vojvodina, but he also competes for Swedish club S.K. Neptun. In 2008 he competed at the Swedish National championship in Stockholm, and won the 200m Freestyle, and all the relays, also finished third at 100m Freestyle. He led the team to an overall win. A year later the team took 3rd place overall and Radovan picked up two bronze medals and again five golds in the relays.

At the 2008 European Championships (SC) in Rijeka he made the final in the Men's 200m Freestyle, after which he placed 8th, also adding a semi-final place in the 50 m freestyle. At the next two European Championships he made semi-finals in the 100 m and 50 m freestyle. Siljevski holds the national record at 200 m Freestyle for Serbia in Short Course pools.

At the 2008 Olympic Games he placed 40th, winning a third place in his Qualification group.

== See also ==
- List of swimmers
- List of Serbian records in swimming
