= Jonas Tilly =

Swedish swimmer

Personal information
- Full name: Jonas Alexander Tilly
- Nationality: Sweden
- Born: 29 June 1984 (age 42)
- Height: 6 ft 3 in (191 cm)
- Weight: 185 lb (84 kg)

Sport
- Sport: Swimming
- Strokes: freestyle
- Club: Trelleborgs SS
- College team: California Golden Bears (2003–2006)
Medal record
World Championships – Short Course
Silver medal – second place	2006 Shanghai	4x100m freestyle
European Championships (SC)
Gold medal – first place	2006 Helsinki	4x50m Freestyle

Jonas Tilly (born 29 June 1984) is a freestyle swimmer from Sweden. He was a member of the Swedish world record team in 4x50m freestyle at the European Short Course Swimming Championships 2006 together with Marcus Piehl, Petter Stymne and Stefan Nystrand. Studied at University of California and swum in their swim team between 2003 and 2006.

== Clubs ==
- Trelleborgs SS
