= Christoffer Vikström =

Swedish swimmer (born 1987)

Personal information
- Full name: Björn Christoffer Vilhelm Vikström
- Nationality: Sweden
- Born: 2 February 1987 (age 39) Borlänge, Sweden

Sport
- Sport: Swimming
- Strokes: freestyle
- Club: Upsala SS

Björn Christoffer Vilhelm Vikström (born 2 February 1987) is an Olympic swimmer from Sweden. He swam for Sweden at the 2008 Summer Olympics.
