= Christoffer Carlsen =

Swedish swimmer

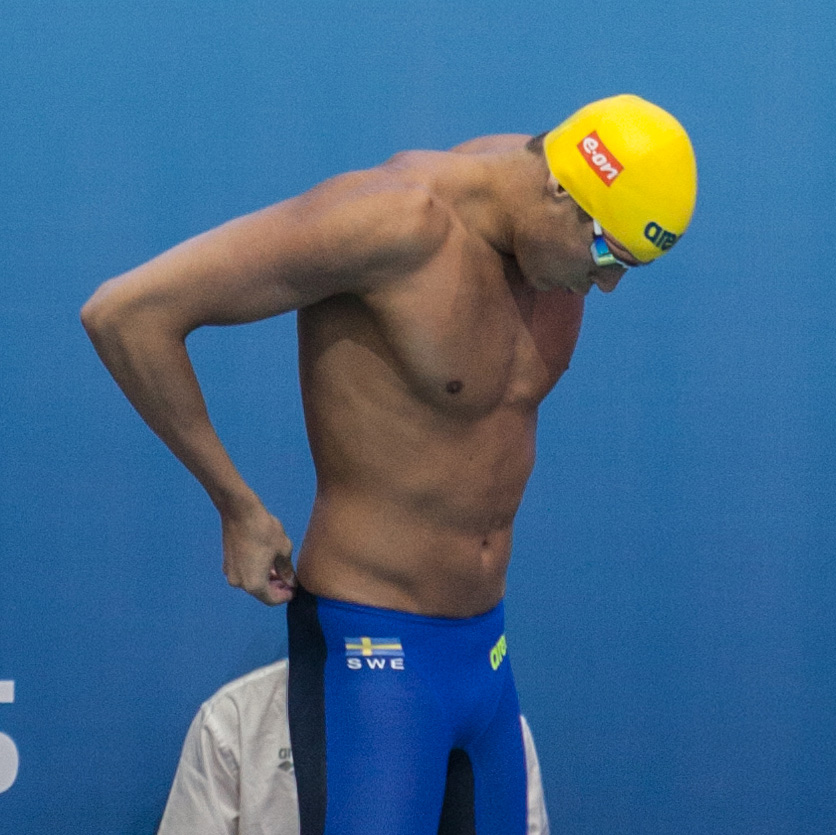

Personal information
- Nationality: Swedish
- Born: 6 May 1992 (age 32)

Sport
- Sport: Swimming

Christoffer Carlsen (born 6 May 1992) is a Swedish swimmer. He competed in the men's 50 metre freestyle event at the 2018 FINA World Swimming Championships (25 m), in Hangzhou, China.
