= Rikard Milton =

Swedish swimmer

Personal information
- Born: June 22, 1965 (age 61)
Medal record
Men's swimming
Representing Sweden
Olympic Games
| Bronze medal – third place | 1984 Los Angeles | 4x100 m freestyle |

Jack Rikard Milton (born June 22, 1965) is a former Swedish swimmer from Uppsala, who represented Upsala SS and Sweden in two Summer Olympics, 1984 and 1988. He was awarded a bronze medal as part of the 4x100 m freestyle team in 1984 after only swimming the heats.
