= Jan Bidrman =

Swedish swimmer

Jan Bidrman (born 2 April 1966 in Rakovník, Czechoslovakia) is the head coach of the Calgary Academy of Swimming Excellence and the high performance coach of Swim Alberta. Formerly a decorated international athlete in Sweden, Bidrman was selected to the Swedish National Swim Team for both the 1988 Summer Olympics in Seoul, South Korea and the 1992 Summer Olympics in Barcelona, Spain.

== Education ==
Bidrman attended the University of Nebraska–Lincoln where he competed for the Nebraska Cornhuskers on the collegiate swim team. Graduating in 1993 with a Bachelor of Arts in International Business, Bidrman continued his education and received his Masters in Economics in 1995. Bidrman was also named an Academic All-American in 1990.

== Swimming career ==
Bidrman was a member of the Czechoslovak national team from 1980 to 1985, until his arrival in Sweden where he competed for the Malmö KK swim club. In 1988, Bidrman was selected as a member of the Swedish Olympic Team, but was unable to compete due to regulations concerning transfer of representative country. However at the age of 26, Bidrman was once again selected as a member of the Swedish Olympic Team. At the 1992 Barcelona Summer Olympics, Bidrman participated in both the 200-meter individual medley and the 400-meter individual medley. Bidrman was disqualified in his 200-meter individual medley race, but finished 15th overall in the 400-meter individual medley. Bidrman held both the 200-meter long course individual medley and 400-meter long course individual medley national records for Sweden during his career. At one point, he held the European record for the 400-meter short course individual medley.

== Coaching career ==
Since his retirement as a swimmer, Bidrman has become an international coach, coaching numerous athletes to the national and international level.

Bidrman became assistant coach to Cal Bentz at the University of Nebraska–Lincoln in 1992. He later became coach of the South African swim team, leading a seven-member team to six top eight finalists at the 1996 Summer Olympics in Atlanta, United States. Of these members, Bidrman coached Olympic bronze medalist Marianne Kriel in the 100-meter backstroke.

In 1997, Bidrman was appointed as head coach for the Calgary Swim Center. Since then Bidrman has been appointed as the head coach of the Calgary Academy for Swimming Excellence which works towards an “independent vision and plan for the development of continued production of internationally competitive swimmers.” As head coach, Bidrman works in conjunction with the Canadian Sport Center and the carded athletes under his direction. Bidrman also acts as the high performance coach of Swim Alberta.

Throughout his coaching career, Bidrman has been selected to the Canadian Olympic Swim Team for the 2000 Summer Olympics in Sydney, Australia, the 2004 Summer Olympics in Athens, Greece, and the 2008 Summer Olympics in Beijing, China. Bidrman has also been appointed as a coach for many other international competitions, including the 1998 World Aquatics Championships in Perth, Australia, the 2001 World Aquatics Championships in Fukuoka, Japan, and the 2002 Commonwealth Games in Manchester, England.

== Personal Bests ==
=== Long Course (50 m) ===
Event	Time		Date	Meet	Location	Ref
200 m individual medley	2:03.05	NR	23 Nov 1990	Swedish SC Championships	Gothenburg, Sweden	
400 m individual medley	4:22.96	NR (h)	27 Jul 1992	Olympic Games	Barcelona, Spain	

Legend: WR – World record; ER – European record; NR – Swedish record;
Records not set in finals: h – heat; sf – semifinal; r – relay 1st leg; rh – relay heat 1st leg; b – B final; † – en route to final mark; so – swim-off; tt – time trial

=== Short Course (25 m) ===
Event	Time		Date	Meet	Location	Ref
200 m individual medley	2:00.50		17 Mar 1989	Swedish SC Championships	Malmö, Sweden	
400 m individual medley	4:12.97	ER	18 Mar 1989	Swedish SC Championships	Malmö, Sweden	

Legend: WR – World record; ER – European record; NR – Swedish record;
Records not set in finals: h – heat; sf – semifinal; r – relay 1st leg; rh – relay heat 1st leg; b – B final; † – en route to final mark; so – swim-off; tt – time trial

== Clubs ==
- Malmö KK
