= Leif Ericsson (swimmer) =

Swedish swimmer

Personal information
- Full name: Leif Hjalmar Thottie Ericsson
- Born: 20 September 1955 (age 70) Uppsala, Sweden

Sport
- Sport: Swimming

Leif Hjalmar Thottie Ericsson (born 20 September 1955) is a Swedish former swimmer. He competed in the men's 200 metre backstroke at the 1976 Summer Olympics.

Ericson represented Upsala S in Sweden and California Golden Bears as college team.
