= Henrik Jangvall =

Swedish swimmer

Personal information
- Born: November 20, 1966 (age 59) Sundsvall, Västernorrland

Sport
- Sport: Swimming
- Club: Malmö KK

Lars Henrik Jangvall (born 20 November 1966) is a former Swedish Olympic freestyle swimmer. He competed in the 1988 Summer Olympics, where he swam the 400 m freestyle and 4×200 m freestyle team.

== Clubs ==
- Malmö KK
