= Gary Andersson =

Swedish swimmer (born 1958)

Personal information
- Full name: Gary Knut Emanuel Andersson
- Nationality: Swedish
- Born: 19 October 1958 (age 67) Östra Eneby, Norrköping
- Height: 1.76 m (5 ft 9 in)

Sport
- Sport: Swimming
- Strokes: Freestyle individual medley
- Club: Norrköpings KK, Kristianstads SLS, Västerås SS

Gary Andersson (born 19 October 1958) is a former Swedish Olympic swimmer. He competed in the 1980 Summer Olympics and finished 20th in the 400 m individual medley.

He started his career as a long-distance swimmer and in 1976 and 1977 won the Swedish championship in 1500 m freestyle. 1977 and 1978 he also won 400 m freestyle. After that he changed to 200m and 400m individual medley. He won the Swedish titles 1978 and 1979 in both these competitions.

== Personal records 2013 still among the 20 best in Sweden ==
- 1500 m freestyle 15.41,14 1977
- 800 m freestyle 8.17,47 1977
- 400 m freestyle 3.58,30 1977

== Clubs ==
In his career he represented more than one club.

- Norrköpings KK -1977
- Kristianstads SLS 1977-1979
- Västerås SS from 1980
