= Rudi Dollmayer =

Swedish swimmer

Personal information
- Born: 17 January 1966 (age 60) Karlskoga, Sweden
Medal record
Men's swimming
Representing Sweden
European Championships (SC)
Silver medal – second place	1992 Espoo	50 m Backstroke

Rudolf ("Rudi") Christopher Karl Dollmayer (born 17 January 1966) is a former butterfly and backstroke swimmer from Sweden. He competed for his native country at the 1992 Summer Olympics in the men's 100 m butterfly and the men's 100 m backstroke. He was affiliated with SK Ran in Malmö.
