= Pär Arvidsson =

Swedish swimmer

Personal information
- Full name: Pär Johan Arvidsson
- Nickname: Pära
- Nationality: Swedish
- Born: 27 February 1960 (age 66) Finspång, Sweden
- Height: 183 cm (6 ft 0 in)
- Weight: 74 kg (163 lb)

Sport
- Sport: Swimming
- Strokes: butterfly
- Club: Finspångs SK, Finspång (SWE); SK Korrugal, Finspång (SWE)
- College team: U. California Berkeley
- Coach: Nort Thornton (U. Cal. Berkeley)
Medal record
Men's swimming
Representing Sweden
Olympic Games
Gold medal – first place	1980 Moscow	100 m butterfly
World Championships (LC)
Bronze medal – third place	1978 Berlin	100 m butterfly
European Championships (LC)
Silver medal – second place	1977 Jönköping	100 m butterfly
Silver medal – second place	1981 Split	100 m butterfly
Silver medal – second place	1981 Split	4×100 m medley
Bronze medal – third place	1977 Jönköping	200 m butterfly

Pär Arvidsson (born 27 February 1960 in Finspång) is a former butterfly swimmer and 1980 Olympic champion from Sweden.

== 1980 Olympics and world record ==
He won the 100 m butterfly at the 1980 Summer Olympics in Moscow, after having set the world record in the same event a couple of months earlier in Austin, Texas. Suffering from an illness in early competition, he recovered sufficiently to just capture the 100 meter butterfly gold medal only 0.02 seconds ahead of second placed East German Roger Pyttel. He held the record until April 1981.

Between 1976 and 1983 he became Swedish 200 butterfly champion 22 times, and held the Swedish record in the 200 butterfly until 2008.

== Education and careers ==
After graduating from the University of California, Berkeley with a degree in economics, where he swam for Hall of Fame Coach Nort Thornton, he earned an MBA from Harvard Business School in 1985.

After Harvard, he worked with McKinsey & Co, and later became a Bay Area businessman and entrepreneur. Around 1990, Arvidsson was a co-founder and investor in Bare Escentuals, where he served as both interim CEO and CFO. He helped found and direct GameChange, LLC, currently known as GameChange.com and was a founder of the company, SB2. After a number of years, he founded, directed, and was CEO of Snowshoe Capital, LLC, and was Chief Executive Officer of WCities International, Inc.

== Personal bests ==
=== Long course (50 m) ===
Event	Time	Date	Meet	Location	Ref
100 m butterfly	54.15	11 Apr 1980	-	Austin, TX, United States	
200 m butterfly	2:00.42	18 Aug 1979	US Summer Nationals	Fort Lauderdale, FL, United States	

Legend: WR – World record; ER – European record; NR – Swedish record;
Records not set in finals: h – heat; sf – semifinal; r – relay 1st leg; rh – relay heat 1st leg; b – B final; † – en route to final mark; so – swim-off; tt – time trial

== Clubs ==
- Finspångs SK

Records
Preceded by Joe Bottom	Men's 100-metre butterfly world record-holder (long course); 11 April 1980 – 3 April 1981	Succeeded by William Paulus
