= Martin Gustavsson =

Swedish swimmer

Medal record

Representing Sweden

Men's swimming

European LC Championships
| Silver medal – second place | 2000 Helsinki | 4×100 m medley |

Martin Gustavsson (born November 5, 1980) is a breaststroke swimmer from Sweden. In 2003 he won the silver medal in the 4×50 m medley relay at the European Short Course Championships in Dublin, Ireland, alongside Jens Petersson, Björn Lundin and Stefan Nystrand. He competed in both the 2000 and 2004 Summer Olympics

== Clubs ==
- Malmö KK
