= Södertörns SS =

Swedish swimming club

Club information
- Full name: Södertörns Simsällskap
- City: Haninge
- Founded: 1967; 59 years ago
- Home pool: Torvalla simhall

Södertörns Simsällskap is a Swedish swimming club founded in 1967 and based in the municipalities of Haninge and Huddinge. The club's activities take place in Torvalla simhall, Huddinge simhall, Skogås simhall, and Vårby simhall.

== Swimmers ==
Swimmers that have participated in the Summer Olympics while representing Södertörns SS:

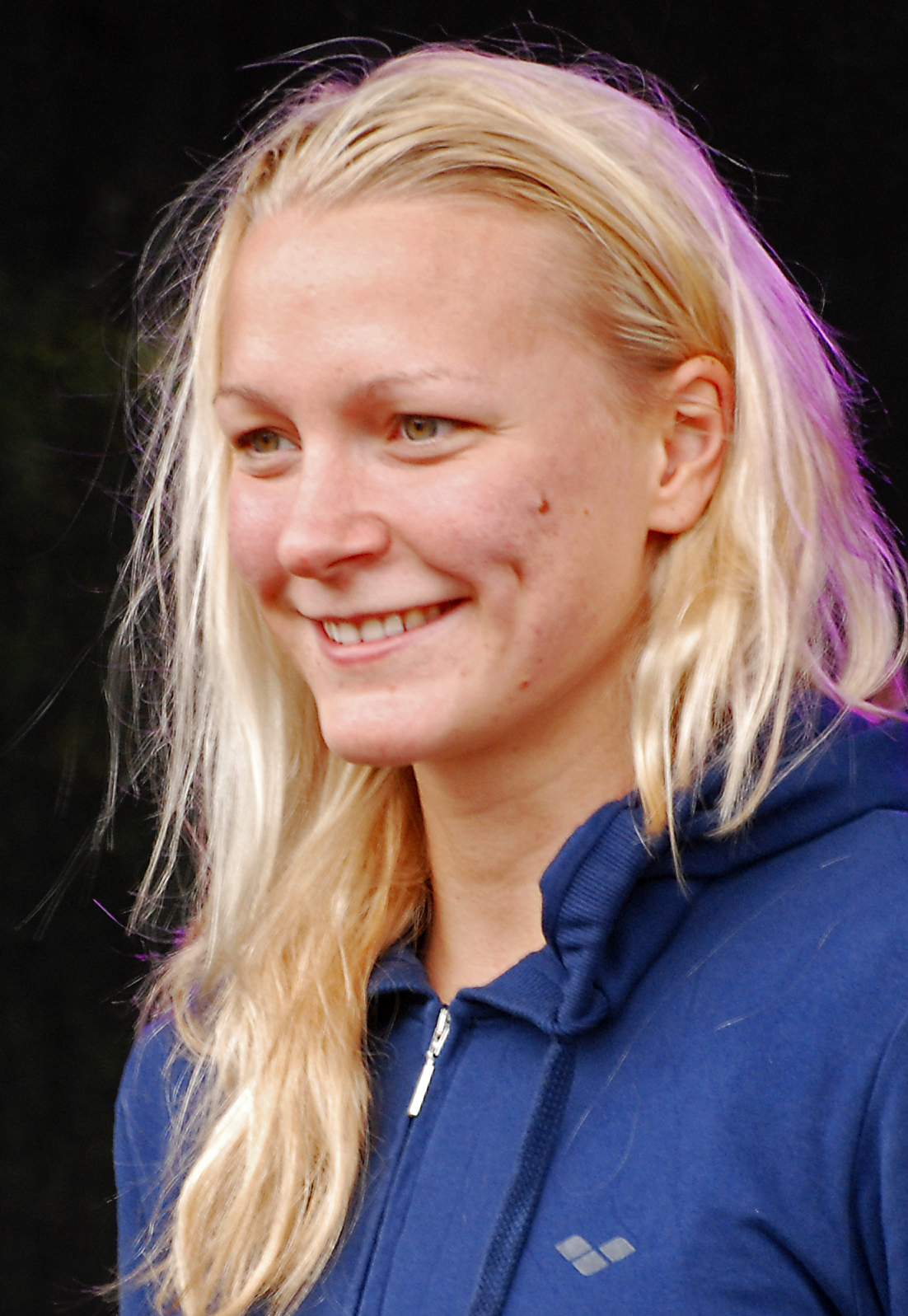
Södertörns SS swimmer Sarah Sjöström in 2013

- Cathrin Carlzon
- Emelie Fast
- Hans Fredin
- Louise Jöhncke
- Stefan Nystrand
- Maria Östling
- Sarah Sjöström
