= Hans Fredin =

Swedish swimmer

Personal information
- Born: 16 March 1966 (age 60) Söderhamn, Gävleborg, Sweden

Sport
- Sport: Swimming
- Strokes: Backstroke
- Club: Södertörns SS

Hans Gunnar Fredin (born 16 March 1966) is a former Swedish Olympic swimmer. He competed at the 1984 Summer Olympics, where he swam the 100 m backstroke and the 200 m backstroke.

== Clubs ==
- Södertörns SS
