= Västerås SS =

Swedish swimming club

Club information
- Full name: Västerås Simsällskap
- City: Västerås
- Founded: 3 November 1910; 115 years ago
- Home pool: Lögarängsbadet

Västerås Simsällskap, commonly known as Västerås SS or VSS, is a Swedish swimming club from Västerås founded 3 November 1910, who competes in swimming, diving, water polo, and masters swimming. The home pool of Västerås SS is Lögarängsbadet in Västerås.

== Athletes ==
=== Swimmers ===
Swimmers that have participated in the Summer Olympics while representing Västerås SS:

- Gary Andersson
- Agneta Eriksson
- Patrik Isaksson
- Ulla Jäfvert
- Sven-Göran Johansson
- Thomas Lejdström

=== Water polo players ===
Water polo players that have participated in the Summer Olympics while representing Västerås SS:

- Per-Arne Andersson
- Peter Carlström
- Folke Eriksson
- Kenth Karlsson
- Bo Larsson
