= Gustav Åberg Lejdström =

Swedish swimmer

Personal information
- Born: March 13, 1992 (age 34) Helsingborg, Sweden

Sport
- Sport: Swimming
- Club: Helsingborgs SS

Carl Gustav Thomas Åberg Lejdström (born 13 March 1992) is a Swedish swimmer representing Helsingborgs SS. He participated in the 2010 Summer Youth Olympics in Singapore, where he finished 10th in the boys' 400 metre freestyle and 20th in the boys' 200 metre freestyle.

Åberg Lejdström is the son of Swedish Olympic swimmer Thomas Lejdström and nephew of Swedish Olympic swimmer Helena Åberg.
