= Fredrik Letzler =

Swedish swimmer

Personal information
- Full name: Fredrik Lars-Owe Letzler
- Born: 17 February 1972 (age 54)

Sport
- Sport: Swimming
Medal record
Men's swimming
Representing Sweden
World Championships (SC)
Silver medal – second place	1997 Gothenburg	4×100 m freestyle
Silver medal – second place	1997 Gothenburg	4×200 m freestyle
European Championships (LC)
Silver medal – second place	1993 Sheffield	4×100 m freestyle
Bronze medal – third place	1995 Vienna	4×100 m freestyle

Fredrik Lars-Owe Letzler (born 17 February 1972 in Västerhaninge, Stockholm) is a former Swedish freestyle swimmer. He competed twice at the Summer Olympics for his native country, in 1992 and 1996, both in the men's 4×100 m freestyle relay.

Letzler represented Järfälla Sim and Spårvägens SF.
