= Mollberg =

Mollberg is a surname. Notable people with the surname include:

- Klasse Möllberg (born 1948), Swedish musician and actor
- Rauni Mollberg (1929–2007), Finnish film director

In fiction,

- the dance master Corporal Mollberg is a character in Carl Michael Bellman's 1790 Fredmans epistlar.
