= Malmö KK =

Swedish swim club

Club information
- Full name: Malmö Kappsimningsklubb
- Short name: MKK
- City: Malmö
- Founded: 1982; 43 years ago
- Home pool(s): Simhallsbadet

Malmö Kappsimningsklubb, commonly known as Malmö KK or MKK, is a Swedish swimming club based in Malmö and active in swimming and diving, founded in 1982 as competitive team for Malmö SS and Limhamns SS.

== History ==
Malmö KK was founded as a collaboration of Malmö SS (founded 10 August 1869) and Limhamns SS (founded 28 August 1925). Since 1993, the clubs are merged and all competitive swimming is in Malmö KK.

Malmö KK had their first Olympic swimmers at the 1988 Summer Olympics, when Henrik Jangvall and Stefan Persson participated. The club had their first Olympic diver at the 1996 Summer Olympics, when Jimmy Sjödin participated.

== Athletes ==
=== Swimmers ===
Swimmers that have participated in the Summer Olympics while representing Malmö KK:

- Jan Bidrman
- Eric la Fleur
- Martin Gustavsson
- Henrik Jangvall
- Malin Nilsson
- Eva Nyberg
- Jonas Persson
- Stefan Persson
- Lotta Wänberg

=== Divers ===
Divers that have participated in the Summer Olympics while representing Malmö KK:

- Christofer Eskilsson
- Jimmy Sjödin
