= Anders Bellbring =

Swedish swimmer (born 1952)

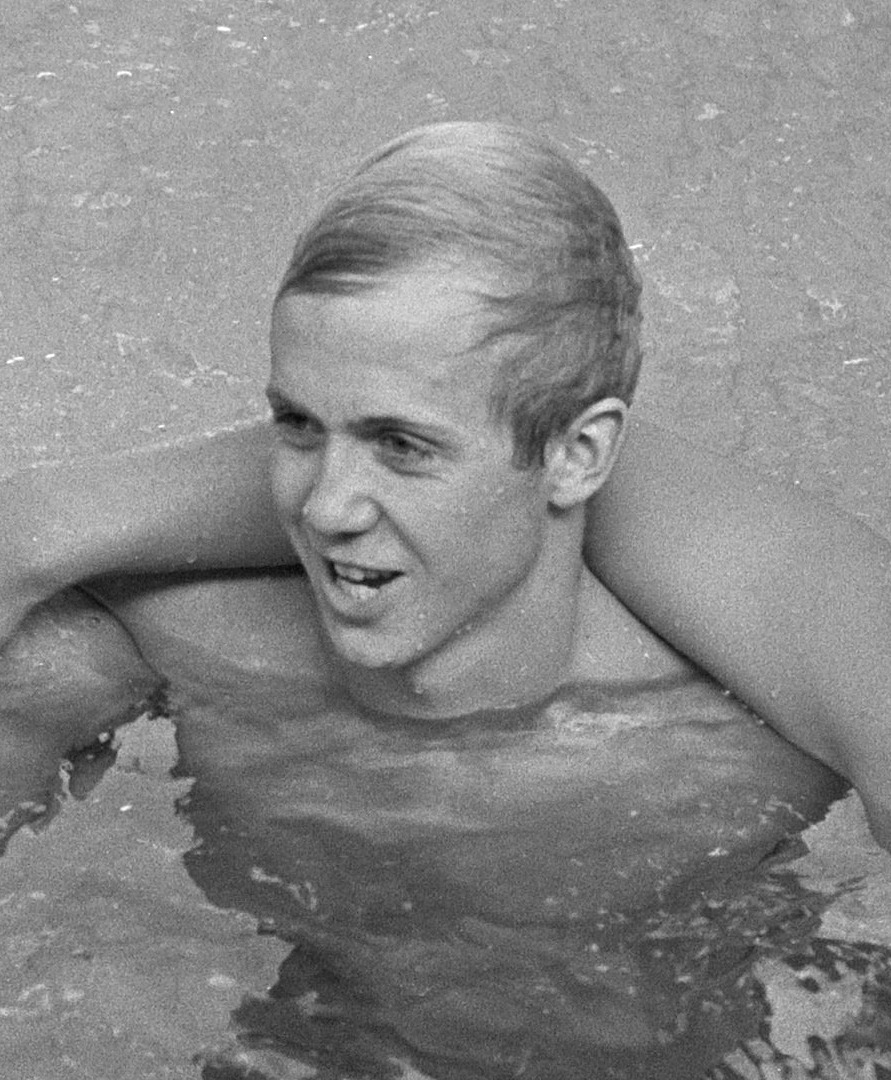
- Anders Bellbring in 1970

Personal information
- Born: 4 June 1952 Uppsala, Sweden
- Height: 1.76 m (5 ft 9 in)
- Weight: 70 kg (154 lb)

Sport
- Sport: Swimming
- Club: Upsala SS, Uppsala; Limhamns SS, Malmö; Simklubben S02, Göteborg
Medal record
Representing Sweden
European Championships
Bronze medal – third place	1974 Vienna	4×200 m freestyle

Anders Stig Thomas Bellbring (born 4 June 1952) is a retired Swedish swimmer. He won a bronze medal in the 4 × 200 m freestyle relay at the 1974 European Aquatics Championships. He also competed at the 1972 and 1976 Summer Olympics in seven freestyle and butterfly events, with distances ranging from 100 to 1500 m in the 1972 Games. His best achievement was the fourth place in the 4 × 200 m freestyle relay in 1972.
