= Spårvägens SF =

Swimming club in Stockholm, Sweden

Club information
- Full name: Spårvägens Simförening
- Nickname(s): Spåret (The track)
- City: Stockholm
- Founded: 1946; 80 years ago (swimming club); 21 May 1991; 35 years ago (Spårvägens SF)
- Home pool: Vällingby sim- och idrottshall

Spårvägens Simförening, commonly known as Spårvägens SF or Spårvägen, is a Swedish swimming club based in western Stockholm. The club is residing in Vällingbybadet, Spångabadet, Tenstabadet, Beckombergabadet, Husbybadet, Eriksdalsbadet, and Nälstabadet. The best swimmer in recent times is former world record holder Emma Igelström.

== History ==
It is a part of Spårvägens GoIF, which started in 1919. The swimming department started in 1946 by the Swedish champion on 200 metre and 400 metre breaststroke Gunnar Sulling and Gunnar 'Hacke' Gustafsson for the employees of Stockholms Spårvägar. Since the late 1950s, the club has been open for persons not working for Stockholms Spårvägar. In 1972, SKK-Spårvägen was started by Spårvägen, Stockholms KK and Bromma SS and lasted during the decade – when it ended, the water polo team remained at Stockholms KK.

Spårvägens SF had their first Olympic swimmer at the 1992 Summer Olympics, when Anders Holmertz participated.

== Swimmers ==
Swimmers that have participated in the Summer Olympics while representing Spårvägens SF:

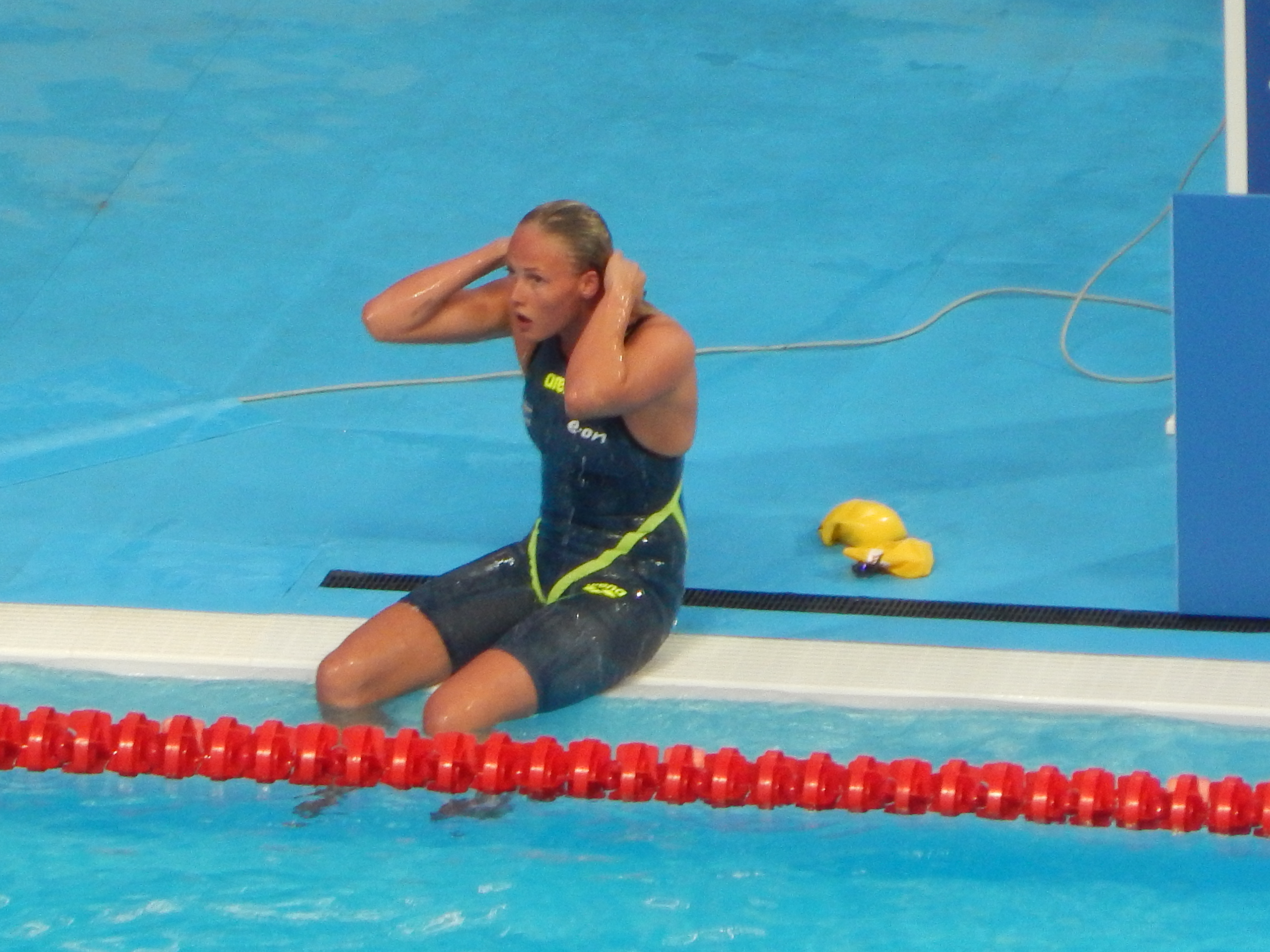
Spårvägens SF swimmer Michelle Coleman in 2015

- Michelle Coleman
- Lena Eriksson
- Robin Hanson
- Anders Holmertz
- Emma Igelström
- Fredrik Letzler
