= Bengt Baron =

Swedish swimmer (born 1962)

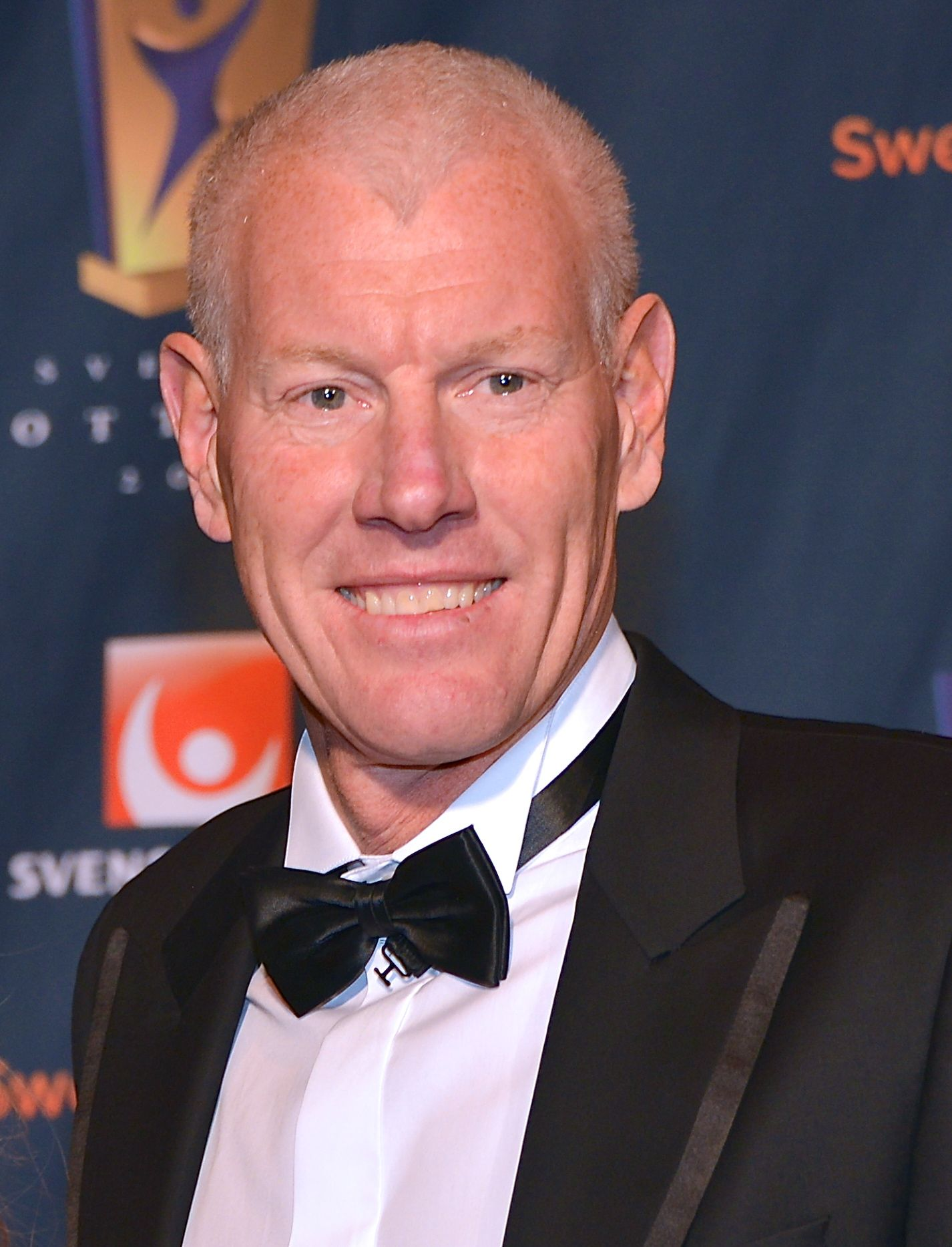
- Bengt Baron at the Swedish Sports Awards inside the Stockholm Globe Arena in Stockholm, Sweden in January 2013

Personal information
- Full name: Bengt Baron
- Nickname: Barre
- Nationality: Swedish
- Born: 6 March 1962 (age 64) Finspång, Östergötland
- Height: 6 ft 4 in (193 cm)
- Weight: 183 lb (83 kg)

Sport
- Sport: Swimming
- Strokes: backstroke, butterfly
- College team: University of California
- Coach: Nort Thornton Jr.
Medal record
Men's swimming
Representing Sweden
Olympic Games
Gold medal – first place	1980 Moscow	100 m backstroke
Bronze medal – third place	1984 Los Angeles	4×100 m freestyle
World Championships (LC)
Bronze medal – third place	1982 Guayaquil	100 m butterfly
Bronze medal – third place	1982 Guayaquil	4×100 m freestyle
European Championships (LC)
Silver medal – second place	1981 Split	4×100 m medley
Bronze medal – third place	1985 Sofia	4×100 m freestyle

Bengt Baron (born 6 March 1962) is a business leader and former backstroke swimmer from Sweden.

Baron won the 100 m backstroke at the 1980 Summer Olympics in Moscow, and was a member of the bronze winning team from Sweden in the 4×100 m freestyle at the 1984 Summer Olympics in Los Angeles, California. An undergraduate student from the University of California, Baron was named into its Hall of Fame in 1999. In the years 1979–1985 he won a total number of 33 Swedish titles.

After his career as swimmer, Baron attended the Haas School of Business at the University of California, Berkeley, where he received his MBA in 1988. Upon graduation, he joined McKinsey & Company in their Stockholm office, after which he joined numerous consumer companies, including Coca-Cola, AB Frionor (a Norwegian frozen seafood company), and Kodak. From 2001 to 2004, Baron was CEO and President of Absolut Vodka, CEO and president of its parent company V&S Group 2004–2008, then CEO for Leaf 2009–2012 and after Leaf's merger with Cloetta he was CEO of the new Cloetta from 2012. He announced in 2015 that he was going to leave Cloetta.

He was previously married to Agneta Mårtensson, the couple has two daughters. He now lives with another woman.

== Personal bests ==
=== Long course (50 m) ===
Event	Time	Date	Meet	Location	Ref
100 m backstroke	56.53	21 Jul 1980	Olympic Games	Moscow, Soviet Union	
200 m backstroke	2:04.40	18 Aug 1979	-	Landskrona, Sweden	
100 m butterfly	54.47	11 Apr 1980	World Championships	Guayaquil, Ecuador	

Legend: WR – World record; ER – European record; NR – Swedish record;
Records not set in finals: h – heat; sf – semifinal; r – relay 1st leg; rh – relay heat 1st leg; b – B final; † – en route to final mark; so – swim-off; tt – time trial

== Clubs ==
- Finspångs SK
- SK Korrugal
- Järfälla SS

Sporting positions
Preceded by Per Holmertz	Swedish National LC Champion; Men's 50 m freestyle 1984	Succeeded by Per Johansson
