= Petter Stymne =

Swedish swimmer

Medal record

Men's swimming

Representing Sweden

World Championships (SC)
| Bronze medal – third place | 2008 Manchester | 4×100 m freestyle |

European Championships (LC)
| Gold medal – first place | 2008 Eindhoven | 4×100 m freestyle |

European Championships (SC)
| Gold medal – first place | 2006 Helsinki | 4×50 m freestyle |
| Gold medal – first place | 2007 Debrecen | 4×50 m freestyle |

Petter Stymne (born 9 May 1983 in Södra Ryd, Skövde Municipality Sweden) is a Swedish swimmer from Skövde, representing SK Neptun from Stockholm. He competed for his native country at the 2004 Summer Olympics in Athens, Greece.

Stymne became gold medalist and world record holder in the 4×50 meters freestyle together with Stefan Nystrand, Marcus Piehl and Jonas Tilly with the time of 1:24.89 on 10 December 2006 at the European Short Course Swimming Championships in Helsinki, Finland.

== Clubs ==
- Skövde SS
- SK Neptun
