= Marcus Piehl =

Swedish swimmer

Personal information
- Born: 23 August 1985 (age 40)
Medal record
Men's swimming
Representing Sweden
World Championships (SC)
| Silver medal – second place | 2006 Shanghai | 4×100 m freestyle |
| Bronze medal – third place | 2008 Manchester | 4×100 m freestyle |
European Championships (LC)
| Gold medal – first place | 2008 Eindhoven | 4×100 m freestyle |
European Championships (SC)
| Gold medal – first place | 2006 Helsinki | 4×50 m freestyle |
| Gold medal – first place | 2007 Debrecen | 4×50 m freestyle |

Marcus Piehl (born 23 August 1985) is a freestyle swimmer from Sweden. He was a member of the Swedish swimming team 2002–2009. His best performance was relay in short course. The Swedish team won the European Championship in 2006 and 2007. The Swedish team was Petter Stymne, Jonas Tilly and Stefan Nystrand.

== Clubs ==
- Linköpings ASS
