= List of swimmers awarded Stora grabbars och tjejers märke =

Stora grabbars och tjejers märke (lit. 'Big Boys' and Girls' Badge') or Svensk Simidrotts hedersmärke (lit. 'Swedish Swimming Federation decoration') is an honorary award in Swedish aquatics, awarded by the Swedish Swimming Federation. Stora grabbars och tjejers märke are honorary awards within several Swedish sports, first named in 1928 by Bo Ekelund. To be awarded, a sportsperson has to gather a certain number of points in international (and sometimes national events) according to different rules depending on the sport in question. The recipients are called a 'Stor grabb' (lit. 'Big Boy'). When women gain the title, the recipient is called a 'Stor tjej' (lit. 'Big Girl').

== Background ==
The divers', swimmers', and water polo players' stor grabb was introduced in 1934.

10 points are needed to obtain the badge in diving, swimming, synchronized swimming, or water polo. Each different event and result gives different numbers of points e.g., in diving, swimming, and synchronized swimming, 10 points for an individual Olympic, world championship, e.g. World Aquatics Championships, gold medal, 7 points for a silver medal in said events, half a point for an individual national championship title, e.g. the Swedish Swimming Championships, quarter of a point for an relay or pairs national championship title, and two points for an individual Nordic Swimming Championships gold medal.

A recipient is granted free entrance to all swimming competitions in Sweden. As of 2025, more than 470 divers, swimmers, synchronized swimmers and water polo players have been awarded.

== Recipients ==
As of 17 January 2025:

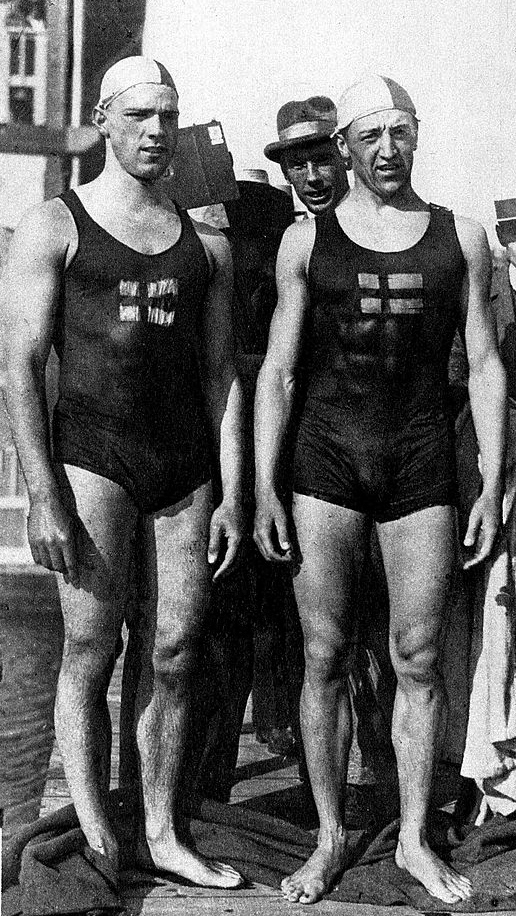
Thor Henning (left) and Håkan Malmrot (right) were awarded Stor grabb in 1934.

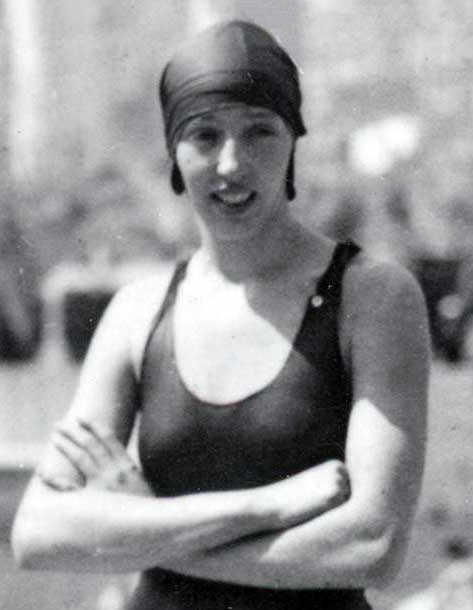
Aina Berg was awarded Stor tjej in 1934.

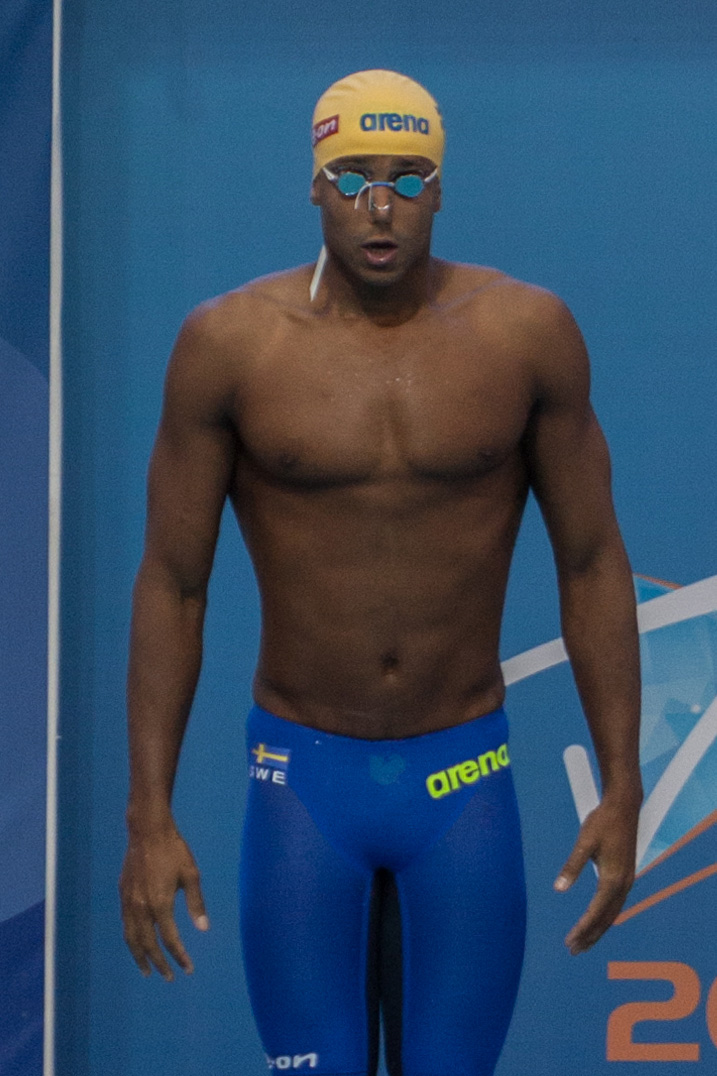
Simon Sjödin was awarded Stor grabb in 2009.

No	Athlete	Year	Club
	Thor Henning	1934	SK Neptun
	Erik Bergvall	1934	Stockholms KK
	John G. Andersson	1934	Stockholms KK
	Erik Adlerz	1934	Stockholms KK
	Arne Borg	1934	Stockholms KK
	Max Gumpel	1934	SK Neptun
	Cletus Andersson	1934	SK Neptun
	Ragnar Schantz	1934	
	Carl Blidberg	1934	
	Harald Julin	1934	Stockholms KK
	Torsten Kumfeldt	1934	Stockholms KK
	Karl Malmström	1934	Stockholms KK
	Erik Andersson	1934	Stockholms KK
	Robert Andersson	1934	Stockholms KK
	Nils Backlund	1934	SK Neptun
	Erik Bergqvist	1934	Stockholms KK
	Åke Borg	1934	Stockholms KK
	Pontus Hansson	1934	Stockholms KK
	Harry Ahlström	1934	
	John Jansson	1934	Stockholms KK
	Hjalmar Johansson	1934	Stockholms KK
	Håkan Malmrot	1934	Örebro SS
	Theodor Nauman	1934	Stockholms KK
	Axel Runström	1934	Stockholms KK
	Nils Skoglund	1934	Stockholms KK
	Arvid Spångberg	1934	SK Neptun
	Orvar Trolle	1934	Malmö S
	Arvid Wallman	1934	Simavdelningen 1902
	Georg Werner	1934	SoIK Hellas
	Gustaf Blomgren	1934	SK Delfin, SK Göteborg
	Gunnar Ekstrand	1934	Simavdelningen 1902
	Erik Harling	1934	Stockholms KK
	Sigfrid Heyner	1934	Stockholms KK
	Per Holmström	1934	SK Delfin, SK Göteborg
	Sven-Pelle Pettersson	1934	SK Neptun
	Georg Svensson	1934	SoIK Hellas
	Helge Öberg	1934	Stockholms KK
	Bengt Linders	1934	
	Vilhelm Andersson	1934	
	Aina Berg	1934	SK Najaden
	Gurli Ewerlund	1934	Malmö S
	Jane Gylling	1934	SK Najaden
	Greta Johansson	1934	Stockholms KK
	Emy Machnow	1934	Malmö S
	Carin Nilsson	1934	Stockholms KK
	Ewa Olliwier	1934	Stockholms KK
	Lisa Regnell	1934	Stockholms KK
	Lala Sjöqvist	1934	Kalmar SS
	Hjördis Töpel	1934	SK Najaden
	Ingrid Dott	1934	Norrköpings KK
	Wivan Pettersson	1934	Eskilstuna SS
	May Eliasson	1934	IFK Stockholm
	Gösta Ölander	1935	Stockholms KK
	Eugen Ahnström	1935	SoIK Hellas
	William Grut	1935	SK Neptun
	Lars Lundvik	1935	Limhamns SS
	Ingeborg Sjöqvist	1935	Kalmar SS
	Gösta Persson	1936	Stockholms KK
	Runor Sandström	1936	SK Neptun
	Tore Ljungqvist	1936	SK Neptun
	Hilmer Victorin	1936	SK Neptun
	Åke Nauman	1936	Stockholms KK
	Martin Norberg	1936	Stockholms KK
	Göte Andersson	1936	Stockholms KK
	Ale Andersson	1936	Stockholms KK
	Bertil Berg	1936	SoIK Hellas
	Eskil Lundahl	1936	Malmö S, SoIK Hellas
	Roland Johansson	1936	Norrköpings KK
	Astrid Carlsson	1936	Nässjö SLS
	Ingrid Stenmarck	1936	Malmö S
	Erik Holm	1936	SoIK Hellas
	Gunnar Werner	1936	Stockholms KK
	Tore Lindzén	1936	Stockholms KK
	Ewert Jernström	1936	SoIK Hellas
	Björn Borg	1937	Norrköpings KK
	Aulo Gustafsson	1938	Stockholms KK
	Å. Göransson	1938	
	Åke Julin	1939	Stockholms KK
	Lennart Brunnhage	1939	Simavdelningen 1902, SoIK Hellas
	Per-Olof Olsson	1939	SoIK Hellas
	Ann-Margret Nirling	1939	Stockholms KK
	John Rothman	1939	Stockholms KK
	Rolf Julin	1940	Stockholms KK
	Gunnel Söderberg	1941	IFK Stockholm
	Maj-Britt Jansson	1943	Limhamns SS
	Ingrid Thafvelin	1943	Eskilstuna SS
	Märta Ölander	1944	Stockholms KK
	Torsten Jansson	1944	Upsala S
	Arne Jutner	1945	SoIK Hellas
	Kerstin Åkerberg	1945	IFK Stockholm
	Eva Petersén	1945	IFK Stockholm
	Britt Walther	1945	IFK Stockholm
	Bertil Persson	1945	SK Ran
	Marianne Fernlund	1945	Stockholms KK
	Åke Attevall	1945	SoIK Hellas
	Nils Blomstervall	1946	Simavdelningen 1902, IF Elfsborg, Stockholms KK
	Rune Gustavsson	1946	SoIK Hellas
	Olle Johansson	1946	IF Elfsborg
	Gunvor Nilsson	1947	Hälsingborgs S
	Ingegärd Fredin	1947	Ängby SS, IFK Stockholm
	Bror-Ebbe Andersson	1947	IF Elfsborg
	Martin Lundén	1947	SK Neptun
	Olle Ohlson	1948	SoIK Hellas
	Roland Spångberg	1948	SoIK Hellas
	Per-Olof Östrand	1949	Hofors AIF, IF Elfsborg
	Rune Öberg	1949	SoIK Hellas
	Svante Johansson	1949	Stockholms KK
	Göran Larsson	1949	Stockholms KK
	Thor Henning Jr.	1951	SK Neptun
	Ulla-Britt Eklund	1951	SK Neptun
	Bengt Rask	1951	Stockholms KK
	Hans Hellbrand	1952	IF Elfsborg
	Bo Larsson	1952	Västerås SS
	Marianne Lundquist	1953	SK Neptun
	Anna-Stina Wahlberg	1953	SK Neptun
	Toivo Öhman	1953	Stockholms KK
	Birte Hanson	1954	Stockholms KK
	Bo Lexander	1955	SoIK Hellas
	Margareta Westesson	1955	SK Poseidon
	Anita Hellström	1955	SK Neptun
	Bo Larsson	1955	SK Neptun
	Björn Branelius	1958	SoIK Hellas
	Hans Andersson	1958	Tunafors SK
	Willy Hemlin	1958	Simavdelningen 1902
	Birgitta Lundqvist	1958	SK Neptun
	Karin Larsson	1958	SK Ran
	Kate Jobson	1958	Varbergs GIF
	Bibbi Segerström	1959	SK Neptun
	Per-Ola Lindberg	1959	SK Neptun
	Börje Karlsson	1959	SoIK Hellas
	Kristina Larsson	1960	SK Ran
	Tommie Lindström	1961	Stockholmspolisens IF
	Håkan Bengtsson	1961	Stockholmspolisens IF
	Lars-Erik Bengtsson	1961	SK Neptun
	Jane Cederqvist	1961	SK Neptun
	Karin Stenbäck	1961	SK Neptun
	Bengt-Olov Almstedt	1961	Örebro SS
	Inger Thorngren	1961	Upsala S
	Barbro Eriksson	1962	Nyköpings SS
	Sten Ekman	1962	Tunafors SK
	Per-Olof Eriksson	1962	SK Neptun
	Bengt Nordvall	1962	SK Neptun
	Mats Svensson	1962	IF Elfsborg
	Hans Rosendahl	1962	Katrineholms SS
	Ann-Christine Hagberg	1963	SK Neptun
	Jan Lundin	1963	Stockholmspolisens IF
	Runar Svensson	1963	Tunafors SK
	Elisabeth Ljunggren	1963	SK Neptun
	Anders Eriksson	1964	Tunafors SK
	Håkan Norrman	1964	Tunafors SK
	Stig Sjögren	1964	Tunafors SK
	Lars Fjärrstad	1965	Stockholms KK
	Thomas Fjärrstad	1965	Stockholms KK
	Roland Lundin	1965	SK Ran
	Rune Johansson	1965	Stockholms KK
	Sören Sandberg	1965	Tunafors SK
	Göran Lundqvist	1965	Stockholms KK
	Jan Engwall	1966	SoIK Hellas
	Karin Cewé-Öhman	1966	SK Neptun
	Ann-Charlott Lilja	1966	SK Najaden
	Lester Eriksson	1966	SK Neptun
	Ingvar Eriksson	1966	Sundsvalls SS
	Peter Feil	1967	Eskilstuna SS
	Tord Andersson	1967	Malmö S
	Lotten Andersson	1967	Linköpings ASS
	Lena Bengtsson	1967	SK Neptun
	Hans Ljungberg	1967	Bromma SS
	Olle Ferm	1967	Norrköpings KK
	Birgitta Haagman	1967	Upsala S
	Ingrid Gustavsson	1968	Luleå SS
	Thomas Johnsson	1968	Skövde SS
	Hans Tegeback	1968	Sundsvalls SS
	Ulla Jäfvert	1968	Västerås SS
	Sven von Holst	1969	Stockholms KK
	Gunnar Larsson	1969	Malmö S
	Elisabeth Berglund	1969	Timrå AIF
	Yvonne Brage	1969	Skövde SS
	Ulrika Knape	1970	Simavdelningen 1902
	Bert Svensson	1970	Stockholms KK
	Rolf Karlsson	1970	Tunafors SK
	Rolf Svensson	1970	Tunafors SK
	Robert Hernadi	1970	Stockholms KK
	Yvonne Hiljebäck	1971	Stockholmspolisens IF
	Gunilla Jonsson	1971	Malmö S
	Eva Wikner	1971	Stockholmspolisens IF
	Edgar Ingelsson	1971	Stockholms KK
	Jan-Olof Fahlén	1971	Västerås SS
	Bo Westergren	1971	Stockholmspolisens IF
	Dick Fristedt	1971	Stockholms KK
	Eva Folkesson	1971	Kristianstads SLS
	Anita Zarnowiecki	1971	Simavdelningen 1902
	Anders Bellbring	1971	Upsala S
	Tommy Danielson	1971	Stockholms KK
	Lars Engström	1971	Stockholms KK
	Göran Jansson	1971	Stockholmspolisens IF
	Agneta Henriksson	1971	Göteborgs KK Najaden
	Tommy Sjöstrand	1971	Västerås SS
	Sten Jansson	1971	Västerås SS
	Bengt Gingsjö	1972	Simavdelningen 1902
	Christer Sandstedt	1972	Simavdelningen 1902
	Irwi Johansson	1973	Göteborgs KK Najaden
	Diana Olsson	1973	Stockholmspolisens IF
	Britt-Marie Smedh	1973	Stockholmspolisens IF
	Olle Andersson	1973	SK Ran
	Mathz Lindberg	1973	Karlskoga SS
	Peter Pettersson	1974	SK Laxen
	Gunilla Andersson	1974	SK Neptun
	Else Gunsten	1974	Kristianstads SLS
	Lena Isaksson	1974	Stockholmspolisens IF
	Jeanette Pettersson	1974	Göteborgs KK Najaden
	Barbro Anséhn	1974	Simavdelningen 1902
	Marie Cervin	1974	Simavdelningen 1902
	Per-Arne Carlsson	1974	SKK-Spårvägen
	Kent-Ove Sjöstrand	1974	Västerås SS
	Bernt Zarnowiecki	1974	Falu SS
	Glen Bengtsson	1975	Simavdelningen 1902
	Mikael Brandén	1975	Stockholmspolisens IF
	Glen Christiansen	1975	Simavdelningen 1902
	Svante Zetterlund	1975	Karlskoga SS
	Eva Andersson	1975	Göteborgs KK Najaden
	Gunilla Lundberg	1975	Umeå SS
	Sören Carlsson	1975	Simavdelningen 1902
	Ida Hansson	1976	Simavdelningen 1902
	Leif Eriksson	1976	Upsala S
	Anders Norling	1976	Stockholmspolisens IF
	Rolf Pettersson	1976	Simavdelningen 1902
	Lars Carlsson	1976	SKK-Spårvägen
	Mats Jutner	1976	SKK-Spårvägen
	Eva-Marie Håkansson	1977	Kristianstads SLS
	Pia Mårtensson	1977	Varbergs GIF
	Ann-Sofi Roos	1977	Kristianstads SLS
	Ylva Persson	1977	Borlänge SS
	Gary Andersson	1977	Kristianstads SLS
	Pär Arvidsson	1977	Finspångs SK
	Dan Larsson	1977	Sundsvalls SS
	Jan Thorell	1977	Stockholmspolisens IF
	Tommy Lindell	1977	Stockholmspolisens IF
	Susanne Wetteskog	1977	Göteborgs KK Najaden
	Ove Andersson	1977	Göteborgs KK Najaden
	Christer Stenberg	1977	PK Hellas-Neptun
	Peter Carlström	1977	Västerås SS
	Lars Erlandsson	1977	Göteborgs KK Najaden
	Susanne Ackum	1978	Borlänge SS
	Anette Fredriksson	1978	Simavdelningen 1902
	Birgitta Jönsson	1978	Avesta SS
	Per Holmertz	1978	Motala SS
	Per-Alvar Magnusson	1978	Upsala S
	Per Hallqvist	1978	Stockholms KK
	Hans Lundén	1978	PK Hellas-Neptun
	Tina Gustafsson	1979	Norrköpings KK
	Gunnar Johansson	1979	Göteborgs KK Najaden
	Kenth Karlsson	1979	Västerås SS
	Agneta Eriksson	1980	Västerås SS
	Agneta Mårtensson	1980	Karlslunds IF
	Bengt Baron	1980	SK Korrugal
	Peter Berggren	1980	Skärets SS
	Per Johansson	1980	Borlänge SS
	Thomas Lejdström	1980	Västerås SS
	Per-Ola Quist	1980	Helsingborgs S
	Michael Söderlund	1980	Karlskrona SS
	Per Wikström	1980	Borlänge SS
	Arne Claesson	1980	SK Neptun
	Lars Skåål	1980	Stockholms KK
	Armi Airaksinen	1981	Stockholmspolisens IF
	Johanna Holmén	1982	Västerås SS
	Annelie Holmström	1982	Stockholmspolisens IF
	Ann Linder	1982	Göteborgs KK Najaden
	Anette Philipsson	1982	Linköpings ASS
	Per-Arne Andersson	1982	Västerås SS
	Anders Flodqvist	1982	Stockholmspolisens IF
	Sören Wallgren	1982	SK Neptun
	Kjell Persson	1982	SK Poseidon
	Anita Rossing-Brown	1983	Simavdelningen 1902
	Anders Ericson	1983	Stockholms KK
	Kenneth Eriksson	1983	Stockholmspolisens IF
	Stefan Tredahl	1983	Stockholmspolisens IF
	Hans Öberg	1983	SK Neptun
	Sofia Kraft	1984	SK Götene
	Marianne Weinås	1984	Simavdelningen 1902
	Mikael Örn	1984	Kristianstads SLS
	Ulf Ericson	1984	Stockholms KK
	Anders Nyby	1984	Simavdelningen 1902
	Tommy Svendsen	1984	SK Ran
	Maria Kardum	1985	Kristianstads SLS
	Suzanne Nilsson	1985	Simavdelningen 1902
	Anders Holmertz	1985	Motala SS
	Tommy Werner	1985	Karlskrona SS
	Marie Nilsson	1986	Borlänge SS
	Anna-Karin Eriksson	1986	Kalix SS
	Hans Fredin	1986	Södertörns SS
	Anders Peterson	1986	Mariestads SS
	Marie Jacobsson	1987	Linköpings ASS
	Eva Nyberg	1987	Mariestads SS
	Thorbjörn Carlson	1987	Stockholmspolisens IF
	Jari Penttinen	1987	Stockholms KK
	Krister Törnblom	1987	Stockholms KK
	Carola Söderström	1988	Skövde SS
	Mikael Sparrvardt	1988	SoIK Hellas
	Joakim Andersson	1988	Jönköpings SS
	Jan Bidrman	1988	Malmö KK
	Stefan Persson	1988	Malmö KK
	Göran Titus	1988	Örebro Simallians
	Anja Jarlskog	1988	LUGI
	Susanne Lindquist	1988	LUGI
	Tove Wennström	1988	LUGI
	Irene Lusth	1989	LUGI
	Johanna Larsson	1989	Mariestads SS
	Christer Wallin	1989	Mölndals ASS
	Per-Ola Andersson	1989	SK Ran
	Andreas Hartzell	1989	Stockholmspolisens IF
	Stefan Lundqvist	1989	Stockholms KK
	Fredrik Österlund	1989	Västerås SS
	Petter Österlund	1989	Västerås SS
	Ann-Sofie Rylander	1990	Jönköpings SS
	Malin Gustavsson	1990	Helsingborgs S
	Joakim Holmquist	1990	Jönköpings SS
	Louise Karlsson	1991	Skärets SS
	Helena Kälvehed	1991	SK Korrugal
	Therese Lundin	1991	Simavdelningen 1902
	Malin Nilsson	1991	Malmö KK
	Niklas Håkansson	1991	Stockholmspolisens IF
	Lars-Ove Jansson	1991	Upsala S
	Jan Karlsson	1991	Borlänge SS
	Josefine Askagården	1992	Malmö S
	Linda Olofsson	1992	Sundsvalls SS
	Rudi Dollmayer	1992	SK Ran
	Helen Smith	1992	Simavdelningen 1902
	Patrik Morsten	1992	Stockholmspolisens IF
	Rickard Roslan	1992	Västerås SS
	Therese Alshammar	1993	SK Neptun
	Hanna Jaltner	1993	Växjö SS
	Ulrika Jardfelt	1993	Turebergs IF
	Louise Jöhncke	1993	Spårvägens SF
	Susanne Lööv	1993	Södertälje SS
	Magdalena Schultz	1993	Malmö KK
	Ellenor Svensson	1993	Norrköpings KK
	Lars Frölander	1993	Borlänge SS
	Peter Haraldsson	1993	Södertälje SS
	Zsolt Hegmegi	1993	Jönköpings SS
	Fredrik Letzler	1993	Spårvägens SF
	Pär Lindström	1993	Upsala S
	Anders Blomqvist	1993	Stockholms KK
	Gyula Gál	1993	Stockholms KK
	Henrik Sjöberg	1993	Stockholmspolisens IF
	Agneta Flink	1994	Simavdelningen 1902
	Anne Kisberg	1994	Stockholmspolisens IF
	Remus Bagaian	1994	Stockholms KK
	Georghe Bencsik	1994	Stockholms KK
	Claes Jutner	1994	SoIK Hellas
	Mats Lennerthson	1994	Stockholms KK
	Emma Igelström	1994	Karlshamns SK
	Malin Strömberg	1994	Ystads SS
	Patric Robertsson	1994	Södertälje SS
	Jonas Åkesson	1994	Södertälje SS
	Karin Bergqvist	1995	Stockholmspolisens IF
	Christina Blomgren	1995	Simavdelningen 1902
	Lena Eriksson	1995	Spårvägens SF
	Annika Rasmusson	1995	Malmö KK
	Johanna Sjöberg	1995	Helsingborgs S
	Helena Åberg	1995	Helsingborgs S
	Daniel Lönnberg	1995	Växjö SS
	Fredrik Lundin	1995	Ystads SS
	Johan Wallenberg	1995	SoIK Hellas
	Anna Lindberg	1996	Bofors SHK
	Jimmy Sjödin	1996	Malmö KK
	Mikaela Laurén	1996	SK Neptun
	Malin Svahnström	1996	Väsby SS
	Patrik Isaksson	1996	Västerås SS
	Daniel Karlsson	1996	Täby Sim
	Camilla Johansson	1997	Växjö SS
	Maria Östling	1997	Södertörns SS
	Nelly Jörgensen	1997	Helsingborgs S
	Josefin Lillhage	1997	Simavdelningen 1902
	Anders Lyrbring	1997	Simavdelningen 1902
	Jonas Lundström	1997	Sundsvalls SS
	Ulf Eriksson	1997	Upsala S
	Erik Axelsson	1997	Ronneby SS
	Daniel Witschard	1997	Järfälla Sim
	Tobias Marklund	1998	Spårvägens SF
	Daniel Carlsson	1998	Väsby SS
	Jenny Alversjö	1999	Stockholmspolisens IF
	Anna Bakalis	1999	Stockholmspolisens IF
	Jannica Wahlund	1999	Stockholmspolisens IF
	Peter Harmat	1999	Ronneby SS
	Roger Lundqvist	1999	Stockholms KK
	Johan Nilsson	1999	SK Ran
	Otto Pukk	1999	SoIK Hellas
	Oskar Thiel	1999	Stockholmspolisens IF
	Anna-Karin Kammerling	1999	Sundsvalls SS
	Jens Johansson	1999	Sundsvalls SS
	Mattias Ohlin	1999	Trelleborgs SS
	Jenny Morsten	2000	SK Neptun
	Johanna Hindsjö	2000	SK Neptun
	Sara Nordenstam	2000	Väsby SS
	Mickael Jacobson	2000	Täby Sim
	Johan Nyström	2000	Sundsvalls SS
	Stefan Nystrand	2000	Södertörns SS
	Maria Lund	2001	Stockholmspolisens IF
	Erik Rundfelt	2001	Stockholms KK
	Martin Gustavsson	2001	Malmö KK
	Karin Lindström	2002	SK Neptun, SoIK Hellas
	Mikael Axelsson	2002	SoIK Hellas
	Magnus Egerblom	2002	SoIK Hellas
	Dennis Lundqvist	2002	Stockholms KK
	Hannes Reneby	2002	SoIK Hellas
	Roger Sjösten	2002	Ronneby SS
	Magnus Stangenberg	2002	SoIK Hellas
	Eric la Fleur	2002	Malmö KK
	Åsa Sandlund	2003	Linköpings ASS
	Robin Johansson	2003	Stockholmspolisens IF
	Maria Wallberg	2004	SK Neptun
	Tero Välimaa	2004	Väsby SS
	Magnus Frick	2005	Stockholmspolisens IF
	Hanna Eriksson	2006	Södertälje SS
	Ida Marko-Varga	2006	SK Ran
	Marcus Piehl	2006	Linköpings ASS
	Petter Stymne	2006	SK Neptun
	Jonas Tilly	2006	Trelleborgs SS
	Elina Eggers	2007	SK Neptun
	Hanna Gustavsson	2007	Växjö SS
	Gabriella Fagundez	2007	SK Ran
	Johan Claar	2007	Jönköpings SS
	Magdalena Kuras	2007	Malmö KK
	Joline Höstman	2008	Göteborg Sim
	Sarah Sjöström	2008	Södertörns SS
	Claire Hedenskog	2008	Göteborg Sim
	Rebecca Ejdervik	2008	Täby Sim
	Petra Granlund	2008	Väsby SS
	Jonas Persson	2008	Malmö KK
	Anna Gleisner	2008	Järfälla Sim
	Sara Lidh	2008	Järfälla Sim
	Simon Sjödin	2009	SK Neptun
	Christofer Eskilsson	2009	Malmö KK
	Anna Högdal	2010	Örebro Simallians
	Jennie Johansson	2010	Upsala S
	Therese Svendsen	2010	SK Ran
	Erica Elfving	2011	Järfälla Sim
	Anton Hanserkers	2011	Järfälla Sim
	Fredrik Sundgren	2011	Järfälla Sim
	Sara Thydén	2011	Väsby SS
	Martina Granström	2012	Jönköpings SS
	David Nilsson	2012	Järfälla Sim
	Michelle Coleman	2013	Spårvägens SF
	Stina Gardell	2013	Spårvägens SF
	Louise Hansson	2013	Helsingborgs S
	Jesper Tolvers	2014	Stockholmspolisens IF
	Mattias Carlsson	2015	Uddevalla Sim
	Daniella Nero	2015	Jönköpings SS
	Johannes Skagius	2015	Sundsvalls SS
	Erik Persson	2016	Kungsbacka SS
	Alexander Nyström	2016	SK Neptun
	Christoffer Carlsen	2017	Helsingborgs S
	Sophie Hansson	2017	Helsingborgs S
	Ida Lindborg	2017	Malmö KK
	Adam Paulsson	2017	SK Elfsborg
	Vinko Paradzik	2018	Jönköpings SS
	Emma Gullstrand	2018	Jönköpings SS
	Victor Johansson	2018	Jönköpings SS
	Hanna Eriksson	2019	Jönköpings SS
	Agnes Kramer	2021	Falkenbergs SK
	Pernilla Lindberg	2021	Göteborg Sim, SK S 02
	Maja Reichard	2021	Spårvägens SF
	Nicola St. Clair Maitland	2021	Södertälje SS
	Lina Watz	2021	Karlstads SS
	Sara Junevik	2021	Falu SS
	Tobias Klasson	2021	Säffle SS
	Hanna Rosvall	2021	Helsingborgs S
	Niklas Nord	2021	Järfälla Sim
	Andreas Sahlberg	2022	Järfälla Sim
	Mattias Sahlberg	2022	Järfälla Sim
	Emilia Nilsson Garip	2022	Malmö KK
	Elias Petersen	2022	Malmö KK
	Hanna Bergman	2022	SK Poseidon
	Annie Hegmegi	2022	Jönköpings SS
	Klara Thormalm	2022	Jönköpings SS

== See also ==
- List of athletes awarded Stora grabbars och tjejers märke
- List of bandy players awarded Stora Grabbars och Tjejers Märke
- List of footballers awarded Stora Grabbars och Tjejers Märke
- List of ice hockey players awarded Stora Grabbars och Tjejers Märke
- List of skiers awarded Stora grabbars och tjejers märke
