= Regnell =

Regnell is a Swedish surname. Notable people with the surname include:

- Anders Fredrik Regnell (1807–1884), Swedish physician and botanist
- Elsa Regnell (1889–1967), Swedish Olympic diver
- Lisa Regnell (1887–1979), Swedish Olympic diver, sister of Elsa
- Nils Regnell (1884–1950), Swedish Olympic swimmer, brother of Elsa and Lisa
