= Bo Jonsson =

Bo Jonsson may refer to:

- Bo Jonsson (Grip) (c. 1330s–1386), head of the royal council and marshal under the regency of Magnus II of Sweden
- Bo Jonsson (producer) (born 1938), Swedish film producer, see Montenegro (film)

== See also ==
- Bo Johnsson
