= Wretman =

Wretman is a surname. Notable people with the surname include:

- Gustaf Wretman (1888–1949), Swedish swimmer
- Tore Wretman (1916–2003), Swedish chef and restaurateur
