= Diving at the 1912 Summer Olympics – Women's 10 metre platform =

Women's platform diving at the Games of the V Olympiad
- Venue: Stockholm Olympic Stadium
- Dates: 10–13 July 1912
- Competitors: 14 from 3 nations

Medalists
1st place, gold medalist(s)		Greta Johansson	Sweden
2nd place, silver medalist(s)		Lisa Regnell	Sweden
3rd place, bronze medalist(s)		Isabelle White	Great Britain

The women's 10 metre platform, also known as high (plain) diving for ladies competition, was one of four diving events on the diving at the 1912 Summer Olympics programme. It was the first diving event for women at the Summer Olympic Games. The competition was held from Wednesday 10 July 1912, to Saturday 13 July 1912. Fourteen divers from three nations competed.

== Results ==
The competition was actually held from both 10 metre and 5 metre platforms. Divers performed a standing plain dive and a running plain dive from the 10 metre platform, a running plain dive and a backward somersault from the 5 metre platform, and three dives of the competitor's choice from the 10 metre platform. Five judges scored each diver, giving two results. Each judge gave an ordinal placing for each diver in a group, with the five scores being summed to give a total ordinal points score. The judges also gave scores more closely resembling the modern scoring system.

=== First round ===
The two divers who scored the smallest number of points in each group of the first round plus the four best-scoring non-qualified divers of all groups advanced to the final. Ordinal placings were used to rank divers within the group, but were not used to determine qualification.

==== Group 1 ====
Rank	Diver	Nation	Points	Score	Notes
1	Greta Johansson	Sweden	5	36.2	Q
2	Lisa Regnell	Sweden	13	34.1	Q
3	Isabelle White	Great Britain	14	33.9	q
4	Tora Larsson	Sweden	21	31.0	q
5	Selma Andersson	Sweden	23	30.6	q
6	Elsa Andersson	Sweden	25	29.7	q
7	Willy Thulin	Sweden	35	25.0	
8	Märta Adlerz	Sweden	39	21.9	

==== Group 2 ====
Rank	Diver	Nation	Points	Score	Notes
1	Ella Eklund	Sweden	7	34.4	Q
2	Elsa Regnell	Sweden	8	34.9	Q
3	Gerda Johansson	Sweden	16	28.7	
4	Dagmar Nilsson	Sweden	19	27.3	
5	Ester Edström	Sweden	23	26.3	
–	Hanny Kellner	Austria	–	DNF	

=== Final ===
In the final, ordinal placings were the primary ranking method with dive scores being used only to break ties.

Rank	Diver	Nation	Points	Score
1st place, gold medalist(s)	Greta Johansson	Sweden	5	39.9
2nd place, silver medalist(s)	Lisa Regnell	Sweden	11	36.0
3rd place, bronze medalist(s)	Isabelle White	Great Britain	17	34.0
4	Elsa Regnell	Sweden	20	33.2
5	Ella Eklund	Sweden	22	31.9
6	Elsa Andersson	Sweden	25	31.3
7	Selma Andersson	Sweden	36	28.3
8	Tora Larsson	Sweden	39	26.8

== Sources ==
- Swedish Olympic Committee; Erik Bergvall (December 1913). "The Official Report of the Olympic Games of Stockholm 1912" (PDF). Wahlström & Widstrand. Archived from the original (pdf) on 10 April 2008.
