= Diving at the 1920 Summer Olympics – Women's 10 metre platform =

Women's 10 metre platform diving at the Games of the VII Olympiad
- Venue: Stade Nautique d'Antwerp
- Dates: 24–29 August 1920
- Competitors: 15 from 6 nations

Medalists
1st place, gold medalist(s)		Stefanie Clausen	Denmark
2nd place, silver medalist(s)		Beatrice Armstrong	Great Britain
3rd place, bronze medalist(s)		Eva Olliwier	Sweden

The women's 10 metre platform was one of five diving events on the diving at the 1920 Summer Olympics programme. The competition was held on Wednesday, 24 August 1920 (first round) and on Montag, 29 August 1920 (final). Fifteen divers from six nations competed.

== Results ==
=== First round ===
Wednesday, 24 August 1920: The three divers who scored the smallest number of points in each group of the first round advanced to the final.

==== Group 1 ====
Rank	Diver	Nation	Points	Score	Notes
1	Beatrice Armstrong	Great Britain	7	158.0	Q
2	Betty Grimes	United States	13	156.0	Q
3	Stefanie Clausen	Denmark	15	153.0	Q
4	Ragnhild Larsen	Norway	16	152.0	
5	Karin Leiditz	Sweden	20	147.0	
6	Selma Andersson	Sweden	25	143.0	
7	Alice Lord	United States	35	118.5	

==== Group 2 ====
Rank	Diver	Nation	Points	Score	Notes
1	Eva Olliwier	Sweden	6	152.0	Q
2	Aileen Riggin	United States	15	155.5	Q
3	Isabelle White	Great Britain	20	148.5	Q
4	Lily Beaurepaire	Australia	19	147.5	
5	Helen Meany	United States	23	145.0	
6	Brynhild Berge	Norway	29	140.5	
7	Märta Adlerz	Sweden	29	136.5	
8	Louise Petersen	Denmark	34	130.0	

=== Final ===
Monday, 29 August 1920:

Rank	Diver	Nation	Points	Score
1st place, gold medalist(s)	Stefanie Clausen	Denmark	6	173.0
2nd place, silver medalist(s)	Beatrice Armstrong	Great Britain	10	166.0
3rd place, bronze medalist(s)	Eva Olliwier	Sweden	11	166.0
4	Isabelle White	Great Britain	18	158.5
5	Aileen Riggin	United States	20	157.0
6	Betty Grimes	United States	30	133.5

== Sources ==
- Belgian Olympic Committee (1957). "Olympic Games Antwerp 1920 - Official Report" (PDF). Archived from the original (PDF) on 5 May 2011.
- Herman de Wael (19 July 2002). "Diving 1920". Archived from the original on 10 April 2008.
