= Adolf Andersson =

Swedish swimmer

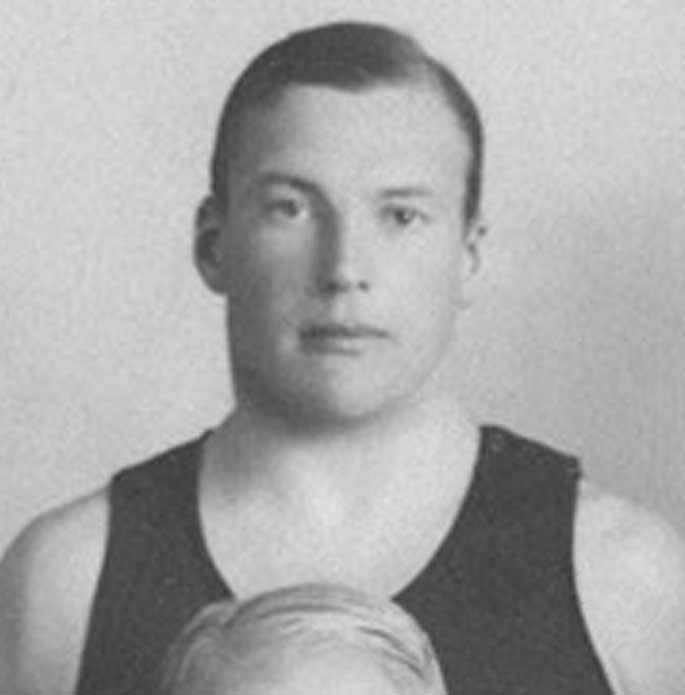

Personal information
- Born: 23 June 1888 Stockholm, Sweden
- Died: 1 July 1985 (aged 97) Stockholm, Sweden

Sport
- Sport: Swimming
- Strokes: Freestyle
- Club: Stockholms KK

Carl Adolf "Ale" Andersson (23 June 1888 – 1 July 1985) was a Swedish freestyle swimmer. He competed at the 1908 Summer Olympics in the 200 m and in 4 × 200 m events, but failed to reach the finals. His younger brothers Erik and Robert were Olympic water polo players, while his sister Selma was an Olympic diver.
