= Belle White =

British diver

- After 1920 Antwerp Olympics

Personal information
- Born: Isabelle Mary White; 1 September 1894 London
- Died: 24 June 1972 (aged 77) Muswell Hill, London
- Employer: Amateur Diving Association
- Spouse: Captain Tommy Edwards

Sport
- Event: High diving
- Club: Hammersmith Ladies SC; Ilford Ladies SC
Medal record
Women's diving
Representing Great Britain
Olympic Games
Bronze medal – third place	1912 Stockholm	10 m platform
European Championships
Gold medal – first place	1927 Bologna	Platform

Isabelle Mary White (1 September 1894 – 24 June 1972) was the first British diver to win a medal at the Olympic Games, and the first to win a European championship. She competed in four Olympics, including the 1912 Summer Olympics, where she won a bronze medal in the women's plain high diving event, as well as the 1920 Summer Olympics, 1924 Summer Olympics, and 1928 Summer Olympics. She also won a gold medal at the European Aquatics Championships in 1927.

== Early life and training ==
White was born in London. She start diving eight years before women's aquatics events became part of the Olympic Games, and trained at Highgate Ponds, for many years the only local highboard facility available, where women were admitted only once a week. According to the Encyclopedia of Swimming, "Much of her training from 33-foot boards, was done from tiny platforms attached to unsteady ladders, rising from the end of seaside piers at Brighton and Clacton".

One year before the 1912 Olympics, White went to Sweden to practice diving from wooden highboards, and was awarded Swedish magister degrees in both swimming and diving in 1911. She became a member of the Hammersmith Ladies Swimming Club, which was founded in 1916, as well as the Ilford Ladies' Swimming Club.

== Diving career ==
=== Olympic Games ===
In the 1912 Olympics in Stockholm, Belle White won a bronze medal in the plain high diving event, which required two dives from 5 metres and three dives from 10 metres. It was the first year that diving and swimming events for women were included in the Olympics. Twelve out of 14 competitors in the plain high platform diving event, including the gold and silver medalists, were Swedish.

After World War I, she competed at the 1920 Olympics in Antwerp in the women's plain high diving event, which required four dives – one running and one standing from both the 4-metre and 8-metre platforms. White placed fourth at the 1920 Olympics, while British teammate Eileen Armstrong won silver.

At the 1924 Olympics in Paris, White placed sixth in women's plain high diving, once again on the 5-metre and 10-metre platforms. She was the only woman on the British squad to make it to the final in the event.

Four years later, at the 1928 Olympics in Amsterdam, White was fourth in her first round heat in what then called the women's "platform diving" event, and did not advance to the final. Nearly 34 years old, she was the oldest member of the British diving squad.

=== European Championships ===
In 1927, Belle White won the inaugural gold medal in women's platform diving at the European Aquatics Championships in Bologna. Although she had not been selected for the British team, White decided to travel to the championships independently.

=== National Championships ===
Belle White was the first winner of the Amateur Diving Association's Ladies Plain Diving Bath championship in 1916, and went on to win the national title a total of nine times. She was also the women's high diving champion in England from 1924, when the Ladies' Amateur Diving Championship began, to 1929. In 1926, the championship was held in Torquay and watched by 10,000 spectators. Following the competition, White did an exhibition dive from a height of over fifty feet, from Saddle Rock in Torquay.

=== Advocacy for sport ===
Prior to the 1928 Olympics, Illustrated Sporting and Dramatic News noted that swimming was gaining wider popularity among women as a sport, and noted that "Miss Belle White, whose diving is really a thing of beauty, strongly advocates it as a panacea for all ills, including care and worry."

== Post-diving career ==
In 1930, White retired from active competition, and was elected vice president of the Amateur Diving Association. She served as a diving judge at the 1948 Summer Olympics in London.

== Personal life ==
Belle White was married to Captain Tommy Edwards, a world fly-casting champion, but was always referred to by her maiden name. She died in Muswell Hill.

== Recognition ==
White was inducted into the Swim England Hall of Fame. The Belle White Trophy was named in her honour in 1935. Now known as the Belle White National Memorial Trophy, the cup is awarded each year to "the female team with the highest aggregate score at the Swim England Diving National Age Group Championships.
