= SK Neptun =

Swimming club in Stockholm, Sweden

Club information
- Full name: Simklubben Neptun
- Nickname(s): Neppan
- City: Stockholm
- Founded: 12 October 1906; 119 years ago
- Home pool: Eriksdalsbadet

Simklubben Neptun, commonly known as SK Neptun, is a Swedish swimming club from Stockholm, active in swimming, diving, water polo, and synchronized swimming. The home pool is Eriksdalsbadet in Stockholm.

== History ==
SK Neptun was found on founded 12 October 1906 by 18 people, all former members Stockholms KK, among them Max Gumpel, Harald Julin and Johan af Klercker.

SK Neptun had their first Olympic participants at the 1908 Summer Olympics, when swimmers Wille Andersson, Max Gumpel, and Gustaf Wretman, and diver Arvid Spångberg participated.

== Athletes ==
=== Swimmers ===
Swimmers that have participated in the Summer Olympics while representing SK Neptun:

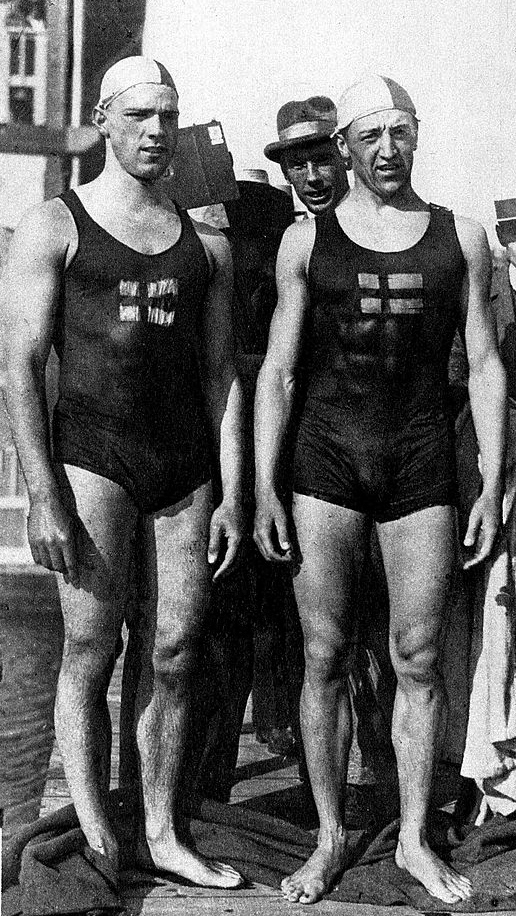
SK Neptun swimmer Thor Henning (left) at the 1920 Olympics

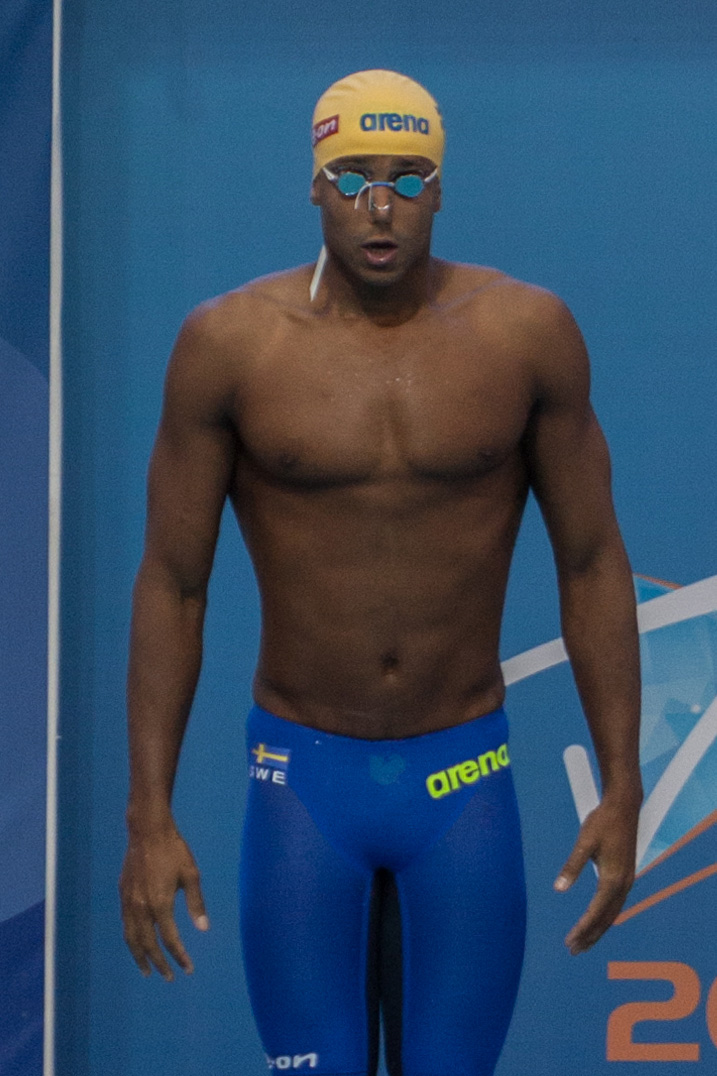
SK Neptun swimmer Simon Sjödin in 2015

- Therese Alshammar
- Gunilla Andersson
- Jonas Andersson
- Wille Andersson
- Lars-Erik Bengtsson
- Maud Berglund
- Jane Cederqvist
- Olle Dickson
- Ulla-Britt Eklund
- Per-Olof Ericsson
- Lester Eriksson
- Ingegärd Fredin
- Max Gumpel
- Ann-Christine Hagberg
- Anita Hellström
- Thor Henning
- Jennie Johansson
- Per-Ola Lindberg
- Elisabeth Ljunggren
- Martin Lundén
- Hugo Lundevall
- Marianne Lundquist
- Bengt Nordwall
- Stefan Nystrand
- Helena Peterson
- Sven-Pelle Pettersson
- Bibbi Segerström
- Simon Sjödin
- Petter Stymne
- Tero Välimaa
- Johan Wallberg
- Majvor Welander
- Gustaf Wretman

=== Divers ===
Divers that have participated in the Summer Olympics while representing SK Neptun:

- Ernst Brandsten
- Elina Eggers
- Arvid Spångberg
- Anna-Stina Wahlberg

=== Water polo players ===
Water polo players that have participated in the Summer Olympics while representing SK Neptun:

- Cletus Andersson
- Wille Andersson
- Nils Backlund
- Max Gumpel
- Tore Ljungqvist
- Gösta Persson
- Sven-Pelle Pettersson
- Runar Sandström
- Hilmar Wictorin
