= Louise Petersen =

Danish diver (1894–1983)

Personal information
- Born: April 8, 1894 Copenhagen, Denmark
- Died: August 3, 1983 (aged 89) Frederiksberg, Denmark

Sport
- Sport: Diving

Lovise "Louise" Kristine Petersen (later Riisbek, later Brandt, 8 April 1894 – 3 August 1983) was a Danish diver who competed in the 1920 Summer Olympics. In 1920, she was eliminated in the first round of the 10 metre platform competition.
