= Gustaf Wretman =

Swedish swimmer

Personal information
- Born: 10 August 1888 Stockholm, Sweden
- Died: 17 October 1949 (aged 61)

Sport
- Sport: Swimming

Gustaf Wretman (10 August 1888 – 17 October 1949) was a Swedish backstroke and freestyle swimmer. He competed at the 1906 Intercalated Games and the 1908 Summer Olympics.

Wretman represented Stockholms KK and SK Neptun.
