= Greta Johansson =

Swedish diver and swimmer (1895-1978)

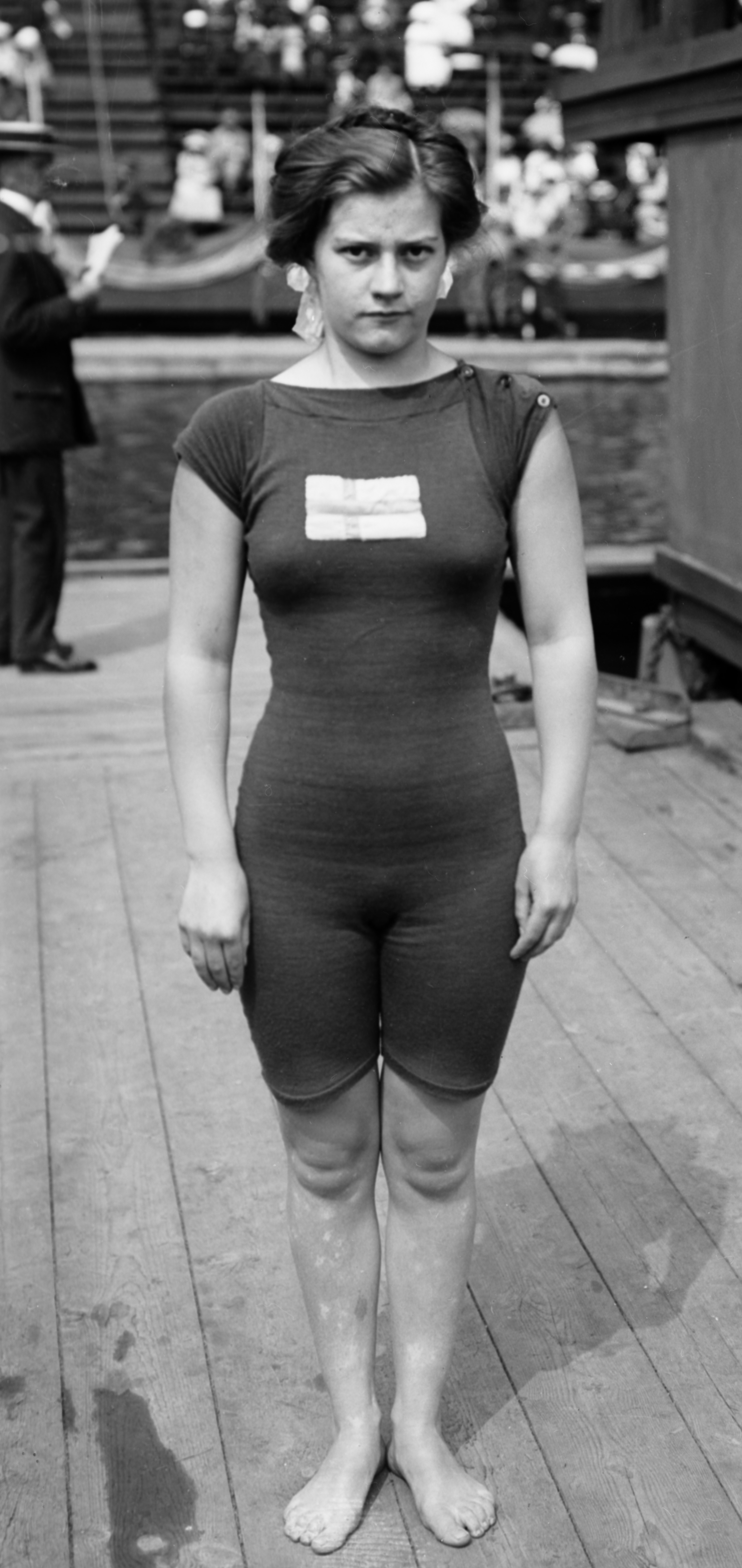
- Johansson at the 1912 Olympics

Personal information
- Full name: Anna Teresa Margareta Johansson
- Born: 9 January 1895 Stockholm, Sweden
- Died: 28 January 1978 (aged 83) San Mateo, California, United States

Sport
- Sport: Swimming
- Strokes: Freestyle
- Club: Stockholms Kappsimningsklubb
Medal record
Representing Sweden
Summer Olympics
Gold medal – first place	1912 Stockholm	10 m platform

Anna Teresa Margareta "Greta" Johansson (9 January 1895 – 28 January 1978) was a Swedish diver and swimmer, who competed at the 1912 Summer Olympics. She won the gold medal in the 10 m platform and finished fourth with the Swedish 4 × 100 m freestyle relay team.

Johansson learned to swim and dive in Stockholm's municipal baths Strömbadet. She attended them on free tickets given at her public school, as all Swedish children were then required to learn swimming and diving. She won the Swedish titles in 1910, in the breaststroke, and in 1911, in the 100 m freestyle and high diving. In 1913 she emigrated to the United States, where she first worked as a shop assistant. There she married the Swedish diver Ernst Brandsten who also competed at the 1912 Olympics. The couple trained divers, swimmers, and the water polo team at Stanford University from 1915 to 1948 and operated the sports and recreation Searsville Lake Park. They were both inducted into the International Swimming Hall of Fame: Brandsten as a diving coach in 1966 and Johansson as a diver in 1973.

In Sweden, Johansson represented Stockholms Kappsimningsklubb.

== See also ==
- List of members of the International Swimming Hall of Fame
