= Nils Andersson (swimmer) =

Swedish swimmer

Personal information
- Born: 24 October 1889 Stockholm, Sweden
- Died: 2 September 1973 (aged 83) Stockholm, Sweden

Sport
- Sport: Swimming

Nils Andersson (24 October 1889 – 2 September 1973) was a Swedish breaststroke swimmer. He competed in two events at the 1912 Summer Olympics.

Andersson represented Stockholms KK.
