= Dagmar Nilsson =

Swedish diver

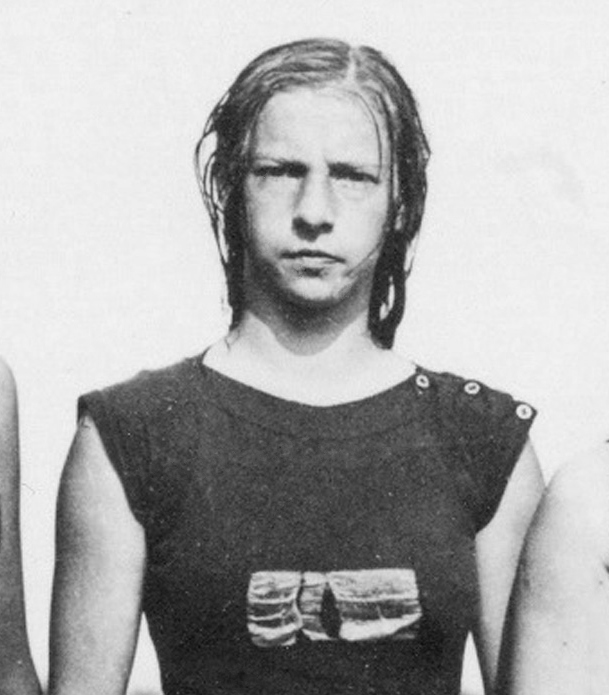

Personal information
- Born: 29 January 1894 Stockholm, Sweden
- Died: 6 April 1974 (aged 80) Enskede, Sweden

Sport
- Sport: Diving
- Club: Stockholms KK

Dagmar Calla Johanna Nilsson (later Törnblom, 29 January 1894 – 6 April 1974) was a Swedish diver. She competed in the 1912 Summer Olympics, but was eliminated in the first round of the 10 m platform event.
