= Brynhild Berge =

Norwegian diver

Personal information
- Born: September 22, 1901 Kristiania, Norway
- Died: February 22, 1975 (aged 73) Bodø, Norway

Sport
- Sport: Diving

Brynhild Berge (later Samuelsen, 22 September 1901 – 22 February 1975) was a Norwegian diver who competed in the 1920 Summer Olympics. In 1920, she was eliminated in the first round of the 10 metre platform competition.
