= Elsa Andersson (diver) =

Swedish diver

Personal information
- Born: 19 August 1894; Stockholm, Sweden
- Died: 26 January 1994 (aged 99); San Francisco, California, United States

Sport
- Sport: Diving

Elsa Helena Andersson, later Cordes (19 August 1894 – 26 January 1994), was a Swedish diver who competed in the 1912 Summer Olympics. She was born in Stockholm and died in San Francisco, United States.

In 1912 she finished sixth in the 10 metre platform competition.

Andersson represented Stockholms KK.
