= Ester Edström =

Swedish diver (1892–1945)

Personal information
- Born: September 5, 1892 Västerås, Sweden
- Died: June 30, 1945 (aged 52) Stockholm, Sweden

Sport
- Sport: Diving

Ester Maria Edström (5 September 1892 – 30 June 1945) was a Swedish diver who competed in the 1912 Summer Olympics.

In 1912 she was eliminated in the first round of the 10 metre platform competition.

Edström represented Stockholms KK.
