= Max Gumpel =

Swedish water polo player

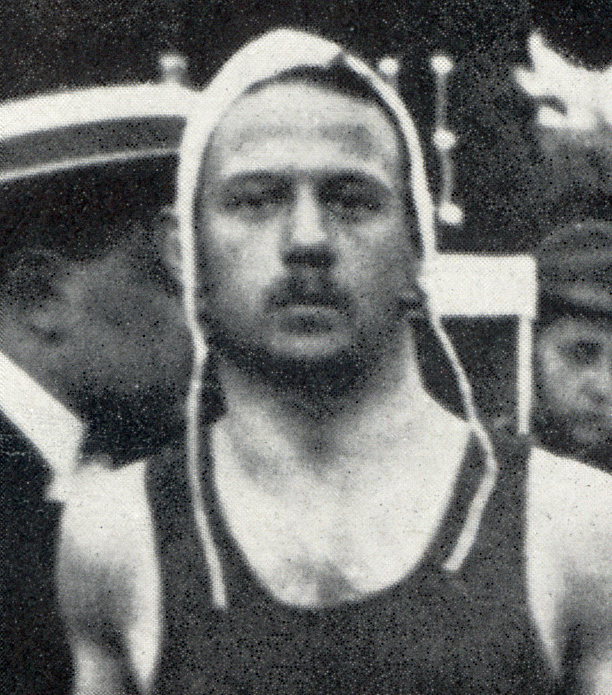

Personal information
- Born: 23 April 1890 Stockholm, Sweden
- Died: 3 August 1965 (aged 75) Stockholm, Sweden

Sport
- Sport: Water polo
- Club: SK Neptun
Medal record
Representing Sweden
Olympic Games
Silver medal – second place	1912 Stockholm	Team competition
Bronze medal – third place	1920 Antwerp	Team competition

Leonard Max Gumpel (23 April 1890 – 3 August 1965) was a Swedish building contractor and Olympic swimmer and water polo player.

Gumpel was born in a rich family, and in 1906 was one of the founders and early sponsors of the Stockholm swimming club SK Neptun. He competed at the 1908 Olympics in the 200 metre breaststroke and at the 1912 and the 1920 Summer Olympics in water polo, winning a silver and a bronze medal in 1912 and 1920, respectively. He was later a board member of the Swedish Swimming Federation between 1919 and 1931.

Gumpel had a short relationship with Greta Garbo before she moved to Hollywood. They kept in touch as friends for the rest of their lives. She was a frequent guest of Gumpel's when visiting Sweden.

In 1912 Gumpel graduated with a degree in construction and founded the firm Gumpel & Bengtsson, which soon assumed a leading position in Sweden. During World War II Gumpel was involved in espionage with his friend Eric Erickson. With their help the allied powers obtained the exact locations of Germany's petroleum refineries and then bombed them. This event was reflected in a book and the 1962 film The Counterfeit Traitor.

Gumpel had a strong interest in boats and cars. He owned the motorboat Laila and the skerry cruiser La Liberté designed in 1934 by Erik Salander – both built at Kungsörs Båtvarv in Sweden.

== See also ==
- List of Olympic medalists in water polo (men)
