= Nils Regnell =

Swedish swimmer

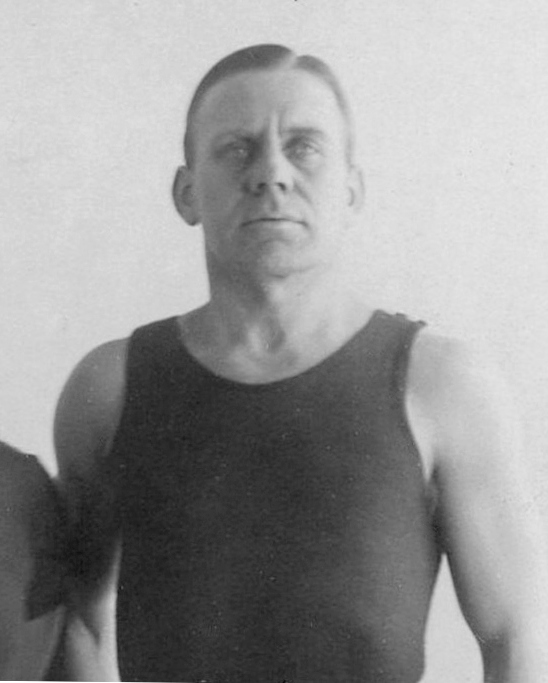

Personal information
- Born: 18 December 1884 Stockholm, Sweden
- Died: 14 November 1950 (aged 65) Jersey City, New Jersey, United States
- Height: 170 cm (5 ft 7 in)

Sport
- Sport: Swimming
- Strokes: Freestyle
- Club: Stockholms KK

Nils Gustaf Regnell (18 December 1884 – 14 November 1950) was a Swedish freestyle swimmer. He competed at the 1906 Intercalated Games in the one mile and 4×250 m events and finished fifth in the relay. His younger sisters Elsa and Lisa were Olympic divers.
