= Ella Eklund =

Swedish diver

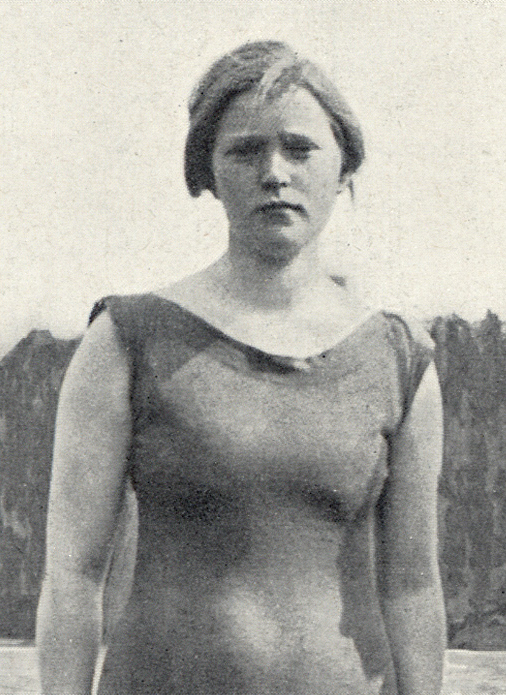

Personal information
- Born: 6 February 1894 Stockholm, Sweden
- Died: 17 August 1953 (aged 59) Stockholm, Sweden

Sport
- Sport: Diving
- Club: Stockholms KK

Elin "Ella" Dorotea Eklund (later Näsholm, 6 February 1894 – 17 August 1953) was a Swedish diver. She competed in the 1912 Summer Olympics and finished fifth in the 10 m platform event.
