= Ragnhild Larsen =

Norwegian diver

Personal information
- Born: 16 March 1900 Kristiania, Norway
- Died: 12 November 1969 (aged 69) Oslo, Norway

Sport
- Sport: Diving

Ragnhild Elisabeth Larsen (later Huth, 16 March 1900 – 12 November 1969) was a Norwegian diver who competed in the 1920 Summer Olympics. In 1920, she was eliminated in the first round of the 10 metre platform competition.
