= Betty Grimes =

American diver

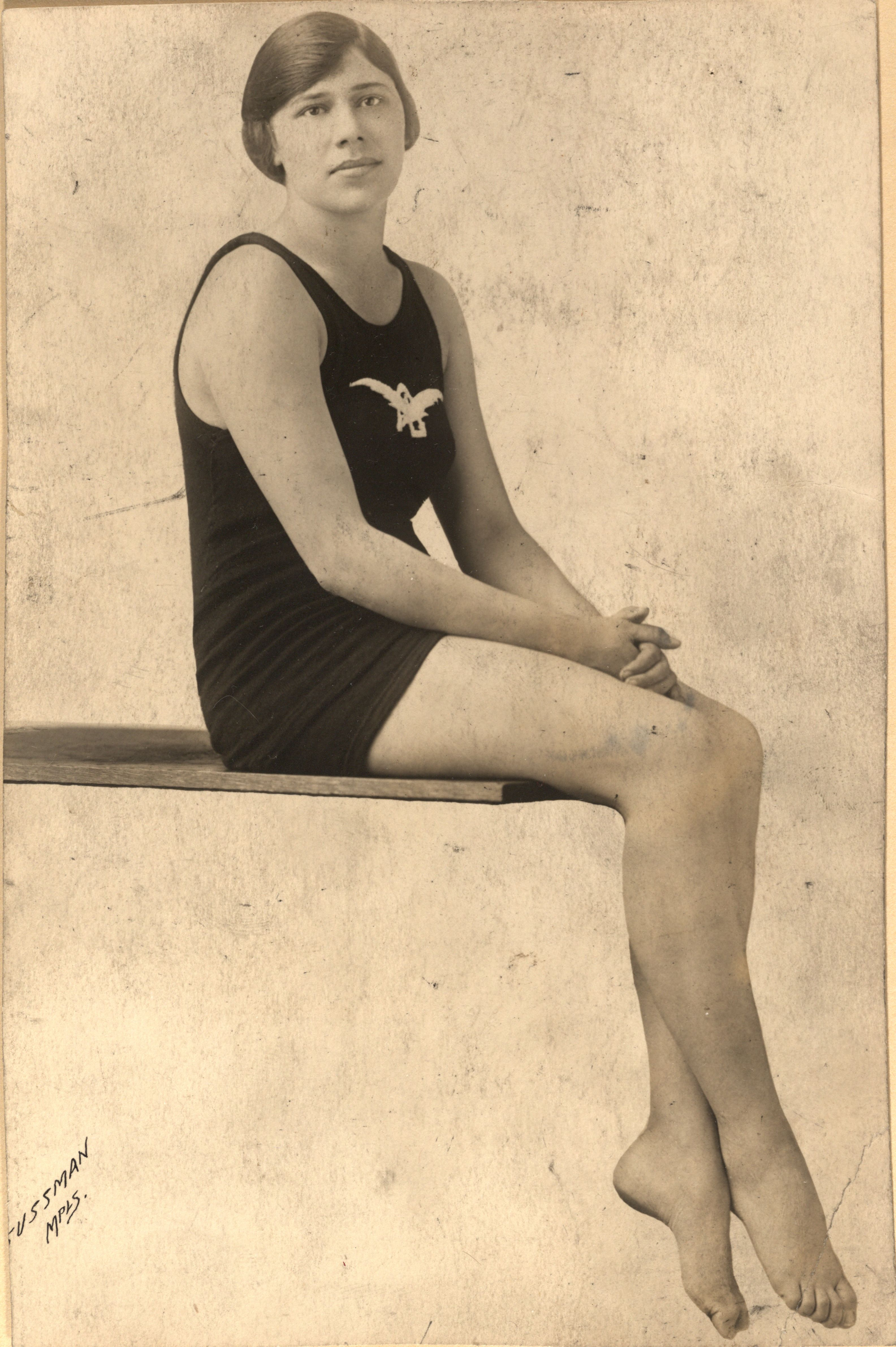

Personal information
- Born: October 25, 1899 Minneapolis, Minnesota, United States
- Died: March 18, 1976 (aged 76) Washington, D.C., United States

Sport
- Sport: Diving

Helen Elizabeth Grimes (later Lindley, October 25, 1899 – March 18, 1976) was an American diver, who competed in the 1920 Summer Olympics. She was born in Minneapolis, Minnesota and died in Washington, D.C.

At the 1920 Olympics, she finished sixth in the 10 metre platform event.
