= Karin Leiditz =

Swedish diver (1896–1974)

Personal information
- Born: January 5, 1896 Hanhals, Halland, Sweden
- Died: June 12, 1974 (aged 78) Lund, Sweden

Sport
- Sport: Diving

Karin Lilly Maria Leiditz (later Jansson, later Lörwall, 5 January 1896 – 12 June 1974) was a Swedish diver who competed in the 1920 Summer Olympics. In 1920 she was eliminated in the first round of the 10 metre platform competition.
