= Tora Larsson =

Swedish diver

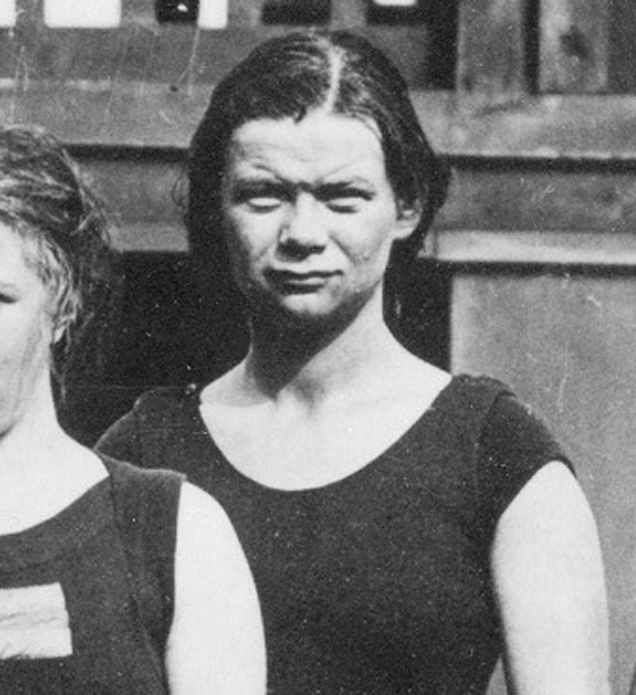

Personal information
- Born: 12 March 1891 Kristinehamn, Sweden
- Died: 1 September 1919 (aged 28) Stockholm, Sweden

Sport
- Sport: Diving
- Club: Stockholms KK

Alma Viktoria "Tora" Larsson (12 March 1891 – 1 September 1919) was a Swedish diver. She competed in the 1912 Summer Olympics and finished eighth in the 10 m platform event. Larsson died in the 1918 flu pandemic.
