= Hilmar Wictorin =

Swedish water polo player

Personal information
- Born: February 25, 1894 Stockholm, Sweden
- Died: April 11, 1964 (aged 70) Stockholm, Sweden

Sport
- Sport: Water polo

Oskar Hilmer Verner "Himpa" Wictorin (25 February 1894 – 11 April 1964) was a Swedish water polo player who competed in the 1924 Summer Olympics. In 1924 he was part of the Swedish team which finished fourth. He played one match.

On club level, he represented SK Neptun.
