= Märta Adlerz =

Swedish diver (1897–1979)

Personal information
- Born: April 3, 1897; Stockholm, Sweden
- Died: February 28, 1979 (aged 81); Bromma, Sweden

Sport
- Sport: Diving

Märta Elvira Adlerz (later Hermansson, 3 April 1897 – 28 February 1979) was a Swedish diver who competed in the 1912 Summer Olympics and in the 1920 Summer Olympics. She was born in Stockholm and died in Bromma.

In 1912 she was eliminated in the first round of the 10 metre platform competition. Eight years later she was again eliminated in the first round of the 10 metre platform event.

Adlerz represented Stockholms KK. She was also the younger sister of Erik Adlerz, who was an Olympic diver himself.
