= Gerda Johansson =

Swedish diver (1891–1965)

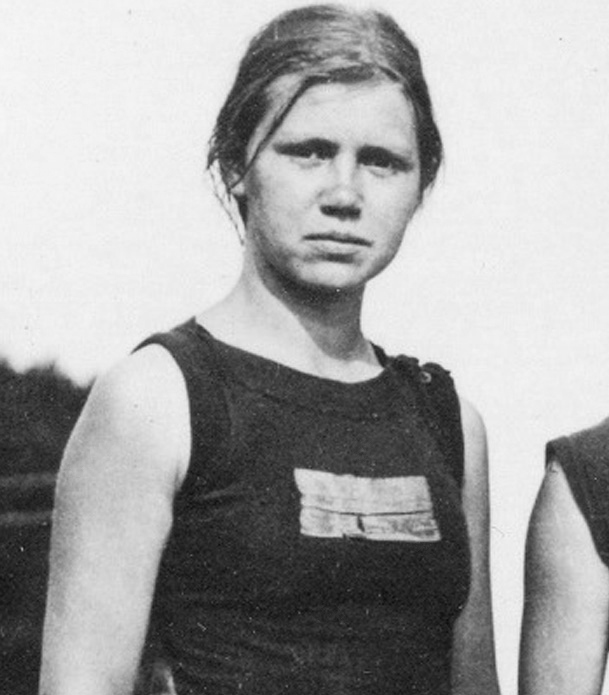

Personal information
- Born: 14 March 1891 Stockholm, Sweden
- Died: 10 April 1965 (aged 74) Hässelby, Stockholm, Sweden

Sport
- Sport: Diving
- Club: Stockholms KK

Gerda Matilda Eleonora Johansson (later Wranné, 14 March 1891 – 10 April 1965) was a Swedish diver. She competed in the 1912 Summer Olympics, but was eliminated in the first round of the 10 m platform event.
