= The Counterfeit Traitor =

1962 film by George Seaton

- Theatrical release poster
- Directed by: George Seaton
- Screenplay by: George Seaton
- Based on: The Counterfeit Traitor by Alexander Klein
- Produced by: William Perlberg; George Seaton
- Starring: William Holden; Lilli Palmer; Hugh Griffith
- Cinematography: Jean Bourgoin
- Edited by: Alma Macrorie
- Music by: Alfred Newman
- Production company: Perlberg-Seaton Productions
- Distributed by: Paramount Pictures
- Release date: April 17, 1962
- Running time: 140 minutes
- Country: United States
- Language: English
- Box office: $2.7 million (US and Canada rentals)

The Counterfeit Traitor is a 1962 American spy thriller film written and directed by George Seaton and starring William Holden, Lilli Palmer, and Hugh Griffith. Holden plays Swedish-American oil executive Eric Erickson, who is forced to spy on the Nazis in World War II. It was based on a nonfiction book of the same name by Alexander Klein.

== Plot ==
Eric Erickson is an American-born Swedish oil executive who is pressured by Allied intelligence agents, led by British agent Collins, to spy for the Allies. Erickson begins his job reluctantly, as it causes marital discord and forces him to pose as a Nazi. He agrees because otherwise his business would be destroyed by the Allies, but over time, realizes it is the right thing to do. Besides, Collins recorded the meeting.

He is influenced in making this moral decision by one of his contacts in Germany, a religious German Christian woman named Marianne Mollendorf, who gives him guidance on the meaning of life and right and wrong. Erickson has a number of close calls, but eventually escapes to Sweden in a harrowing sea voyage.

== Cast ==
- William Holden as Eric Erickson
- Lilli Palmer as Frau Marianne Möllendorf
- Hugh Griffith as Collins
- Carl Raddatz as Otto Holtz
- Ulf Palme as Max Gumpel
- Ernst Schröder as Baron Gerhard von Oldenburg
- Charles Régnier as Wilhelm Kortner
- Ingrid van Bergen as Hulda Windler
- Helo Gutschwager as Hans Holtz
- Wolfgang Preiss as Colonel Nordoff
- Werner Peters as Bruno Ulrich
- Erica Beer as Klara Holtz
- Stefan Schnabel as Gestapo agent at funeral
- Klaus Kinski as Kindler, Jewish refugee
- Jochen Blume as Dr. Jacob Karp
- Erik Schumann as Nazi gunboat officer
- Dirk Hansen as Lieutenant Nagler
- Poul Reichhardt as fishing boat Skipper
- Ludwig Naybert as stationmaster
- Louis Miehe-Renard as Poul
- Kai Holm as Gunnar
- Jens Østerholm as Lars
- Eva Dahlbeck as Ingrid Erickson

== See also ==
- List of American films of 1962
- Eric Erickson, the real-life spy on whom the book and film are based
