= Erik Andersson (water polo) =

Swedish water polo player (1896–1985)

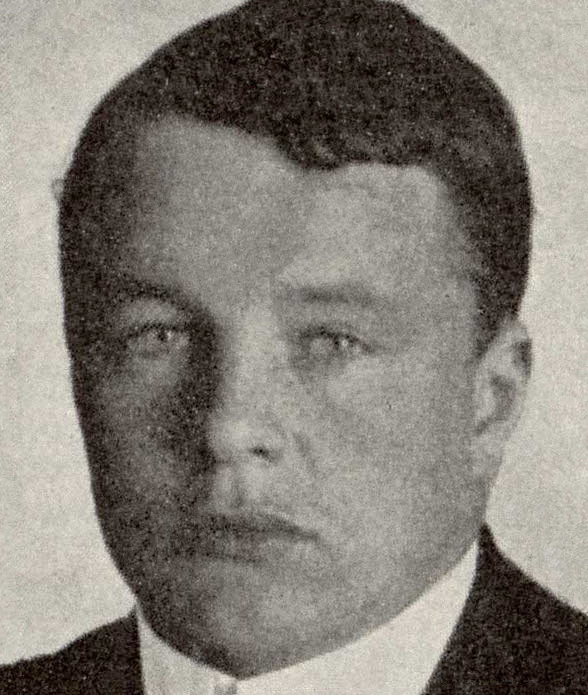

Personal information
- Born: 17 March 1896 Stockholm, Sweden
- Died: 23 February 1985 (aged 88) Stockholm, Sweden

Sport
- Sport: Swimming and water polo
- Club: Stockholms KK
Medal record
Representing Sweden
Olympic Games
Bronze medal – third place	1920 Antwerp	Team competition

Klas Erik "Nello" Andersson (17 March 1896 – 23 February 1985) was a Swedish swimmer and water polo player. He competed in water polo at the 1920 and 1924 Summer Olympics and finished in third and fourth place, respectively. In 1912 he was eliminated in the first round of the 100 m freestyle swimming event.

Andersson was the youngest among four siblings: Robert was also a water polo player and swimmer and competed in the same team in 1920. Adolf was a swimmer, and Selma was a diver.

== See also ==
- List of Olympic medalists in water polo (men)
