= Stefanie Clausen =

Danish diver

Personal information
- Born: April 1, 1900 Vesterbro, Denmark
- Died: August 2, 1981 (aged 81) Fredensborg, Denmark

Sport
- Sport: Diving
Medal record
Representing Denmark
Olympic Games
Gold medal – first place	1920 Antwerp	10 metre platform

Anna Stefanie Nanna Fryland Clausen (1 April 1900 – 2 August 1981) was a Danish diver. She was a gold medalist at the 1920 Summer Olympics.

== Biography ==
Clausen was born on 1 April 1900, the second of four children, and she grew up with her family in Vesterbro, Denmark. In 1915, she joined the Women's Sports Association, and soon began competing in swimming and diving competitions.

At the 1920 Summer Olympics, Clausen won the gold medal in the 10 metre platform competition.

She died on 2 August 1981.

== See also ==
- List of members of the International Swimming Hall of Fame
