= Tore Ljungqvist =

Swedish water polo player

Personal information
- Born: 21 April 1905; Stockholm, Sweden
- Died: 27 January 1980 (aged 74); Trosa, Sweden

Sport
- Sport: Water polo

Tore Gunnar Ljungqvist (21 April 1905 – 27 January 1980) was a Swedish water polo player who competed in the 1936 Summer Olympics. In 1936 he was part of the Swedish team which finished seventh in the water polo tournament. He played six matches.

At club level, Ljungqvist represented SK Neptun.
