= Toivo Öhman =

Swedish diver (1933–2023)

Personal information
- Full name: Toivo Sture Öhman
- Nationality: Swedish
- Born: 5 February 1933 Boden, Sweden
- Died: 23 September 2023 (aged 90) Tyresö, Sweden

Sport
- Sport: Diving
- Club: Stockholms KK

Toivo Sture Öhman (5 February 1933 – 23 September 2023) was a Swedish diver. He competed at the 1952 Summer Olympics and the 1960 Summer Olympics.

Öhman represented Stockholms KK. He died on 23 September 2023, at the age of 90.
