= Göran Lundqvist =

Swedish diver

Personal information
- Full name: Göran Carl Oscar Lundqvist
- Nationality: Swedish
- Born: 4 August 1941 (age 84) Stockholm, Sweden

Sport
- Sport: Diving

Göran Carl Oscar Lundqvist (born 4 August 1941) is a Swedish former diver. He competed at the 1960 Summer Olympics and the 1964 Summer Olympics.

Lundqvist represented Stockholms KK.
