= Beatrice Armstrong =

British diver

Personal information
- Born: January 11, 1894 Hendon, Middlesex, Great Britain
- Died: March 12, 1981 (aged 87)

Sport
- Sport: Diving
Medal record
Representing Great Britain
Olympic Games
Silver medal – second place	1920 Antwerp	10 metre platform

Beatrice Eileen Armstrong (11 January 1894 – 12 March 1981) was a British diver who competed in the 1920 Summer Olympics and in the 1924 Summer Olympics. She was born in Hendon, Middlesex.

In 1920, she won the silver medal in the 10 metre platform competition. Four years later, she was eliminated in the first round of the 10 metre platform event after finishing sixth in her heat.
