= Ewa Olliwier =

Swedish diver (1904–1955)

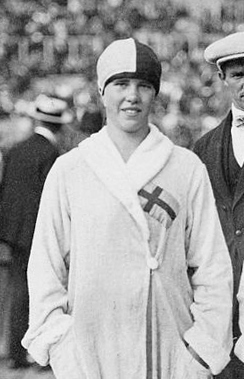
- Ewa Olliwier at the 1920 Olympics

Personal information
- Born: 13 January 1904 Stockholm, Sweden
- Died: 7 August 1955 (aged 51) Stockholm, Sweden

Sport
- Sport: Diving
- Club: Stockholms KK
Medal record
Representing Sweden
Olympic Games
Bronze medal – third place	1920 Antwerp	10 m platform
European Championships
Bronze medal – third place	1927 Bologna	10 m platform

Eva Viola Elisabet "Ewa" Olliwier (later Lundqvist, 13 January 1904 – 7 August 1955) was a Swedish diver, who won bronze medals in the 10m platform event at the 1920 Summer Olympics and 1927 European Aquatics Championships. At the 1924 Summer Olympics, she finished fourth in the 3 metre springboard competition and failed to reach the final in the platform.
