= Selma Andersson =

Swedish diver (1894–1993)

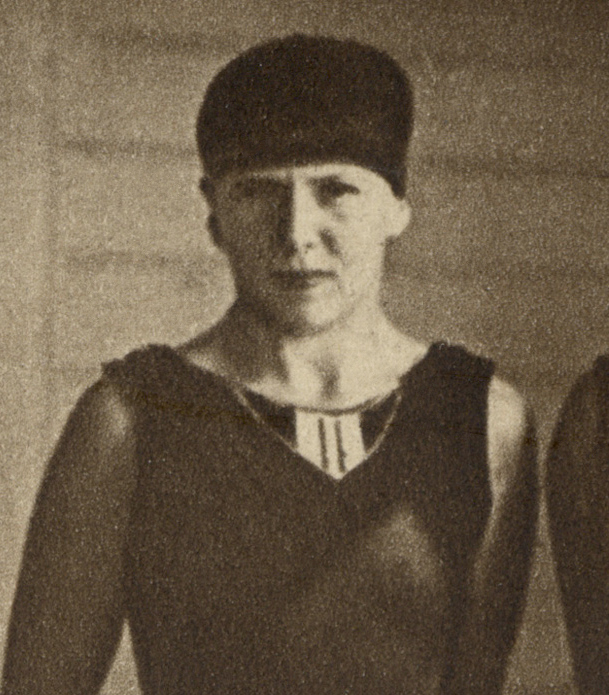

Personal information
- Born: 21 October 1894 Stockholm, Sweden
- Died: 6 April 1993 (aged 98) Nyköping, Sweden

Sport
- Sport: Diving
- Club: Stockholms KK

Selma Augusta Maria Andersson (21 October 1894 – 6 April 1993) was a Swedish diver. She competed in the 10 m platform at the 1912 and 1920 Summer Olympics and finished seventh in 1912. Her brothers Adolf, Erik, and Robert were Olympic swimmers and water polo players.
