= Svante Johansson =

Swedish diver (1927–1986)

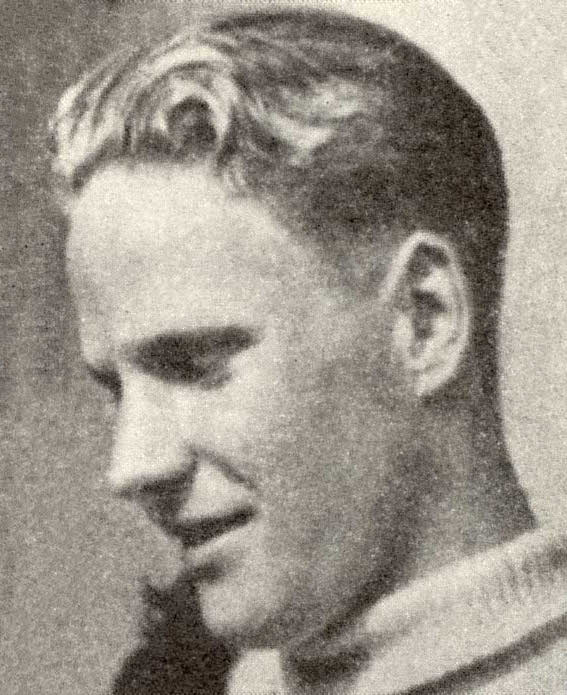

Personal information
- Born: 14 February 1927 Stockholm, Sweden
- Died: 25 September 1986 (aged 59) Stockholm, Sweden

Sport
- Sport: Diving
- Club: Stockholms KK
Medal record
Representing Sweden
European Championships
Silver medal – second place	1947 Monte Carlo	3 m springboard

John Svante Johansson (14 February 1927 – 25 September 1986) was a Swedish diver who won a silver medal in the 3 m springboard at the 1947 European Championships. The next year he finished sixth in this event at the 1948 Olympics.
