= Martin Norberg =

Swedish water polo player

Personal information
- Born: 28 December 1902; Stockholm, Sweden
- Died: 18 September 1991 (aged 88); Stockholm, Sweden

Sport
- Sport: Water polo

Gustaf Martin Eugen Norberg (28 December 1902 – 18 September 1991) was a Swedish water polo player who competed in the 1924 Summer Olympics. In 1924 he was part of the Swedish team which finished fourth. He played all six matches.

Norberg represented Stockholms KK.
