= Sven von Holst =

Swedish swimmer

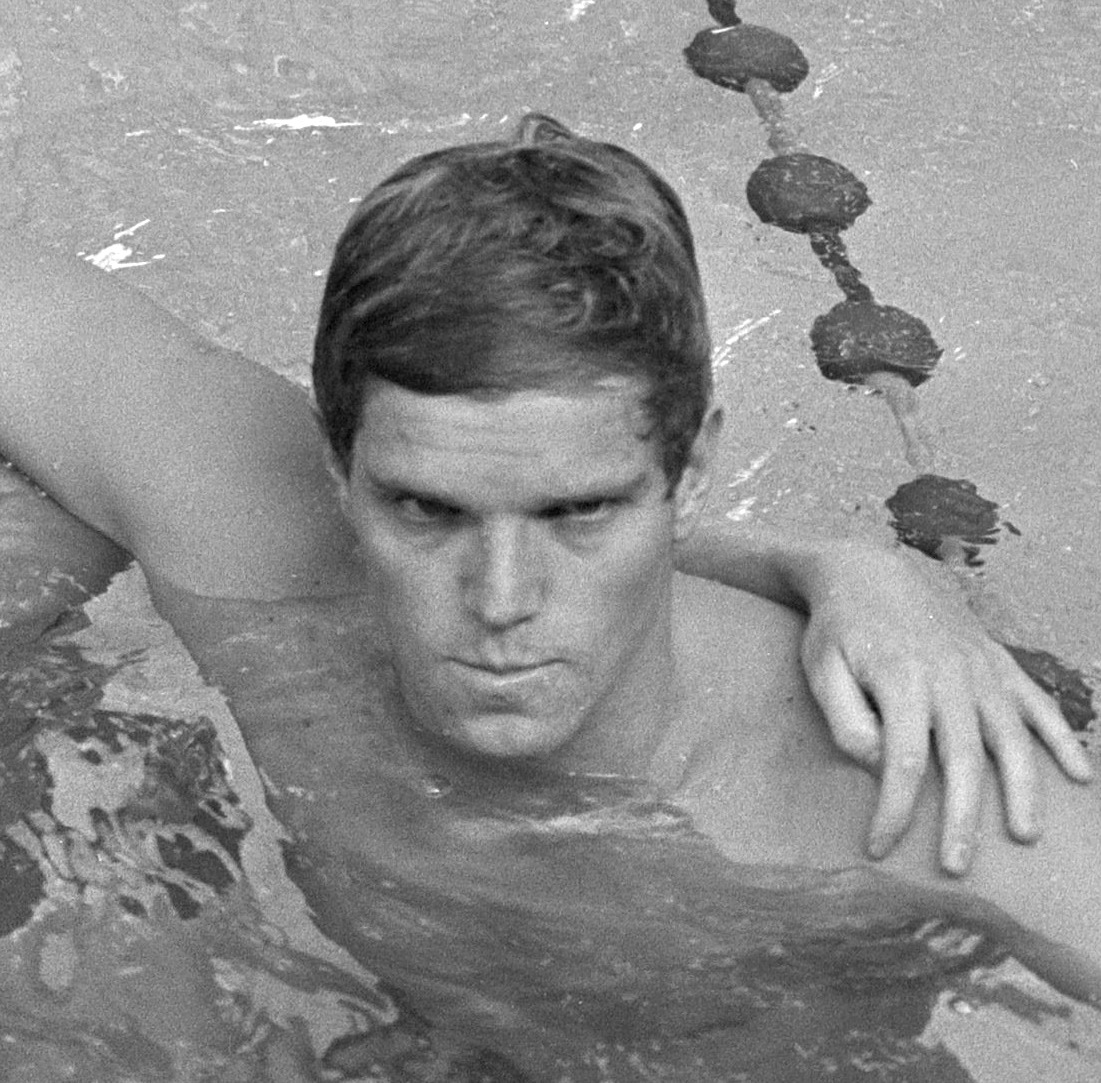
- Sven von Holst in 1970

Personal information
- Born: 30 August 1948 (age 77) Stockholm, Sweden
- Height: 189 cm (6 ft 2 in)
- Weight: 83 kg (183 lb)

Sport
- Sport: Swimming
- Club: Stockholms KK

Sven von Holst (born 30 August 1948) is a retired Swedish freestyle swimmer. He competed in the individual 400 m event at the 1968 Summer Olympics, but failed to reach the final.
