= Tommy Danielson =

Swedish water polo player

Personal information
- Full name: Lars Tommy Eugen Danielson
- Nationality: Swedish
- Born: 25 June 1949 (age 75); Stockholm, Sweden

Sport
- Sport: Water polo
- Club: Stockholms KK

Lars Tommy Eugen Danielson (born 25 June 1949) is a Swedish water polo player. He competed in the men's tournament at the 1980 Summer Olympics.

Danielson represented Stockholms KK.
