= Gunnar Werner =

Swedish swimmer

Personal information
- Full name: Gunnar Arvid August Werner
- Nationality: Swedish
- Born: 14 May 1915 Stockholm, Sweden
- Died: 3 February 1993 (aged 77) Stockholm, Sweden

Sport
- Sport: Swimming
- Club: Stockholms KK

Gunnar Arvid August Werner (14 May 1915 – 3 February 1993) was a Swedish swimmer. He competed in the men's 4 × 200 metre freestyle relay at the 1936 Summer Olympics.

Werner represented Stockholms KK.
