= Strömbadet, Stockholm =

Bathhouse in Stockholm, Sweden

Coordinates: 59°19′36″N 18°03′42″E

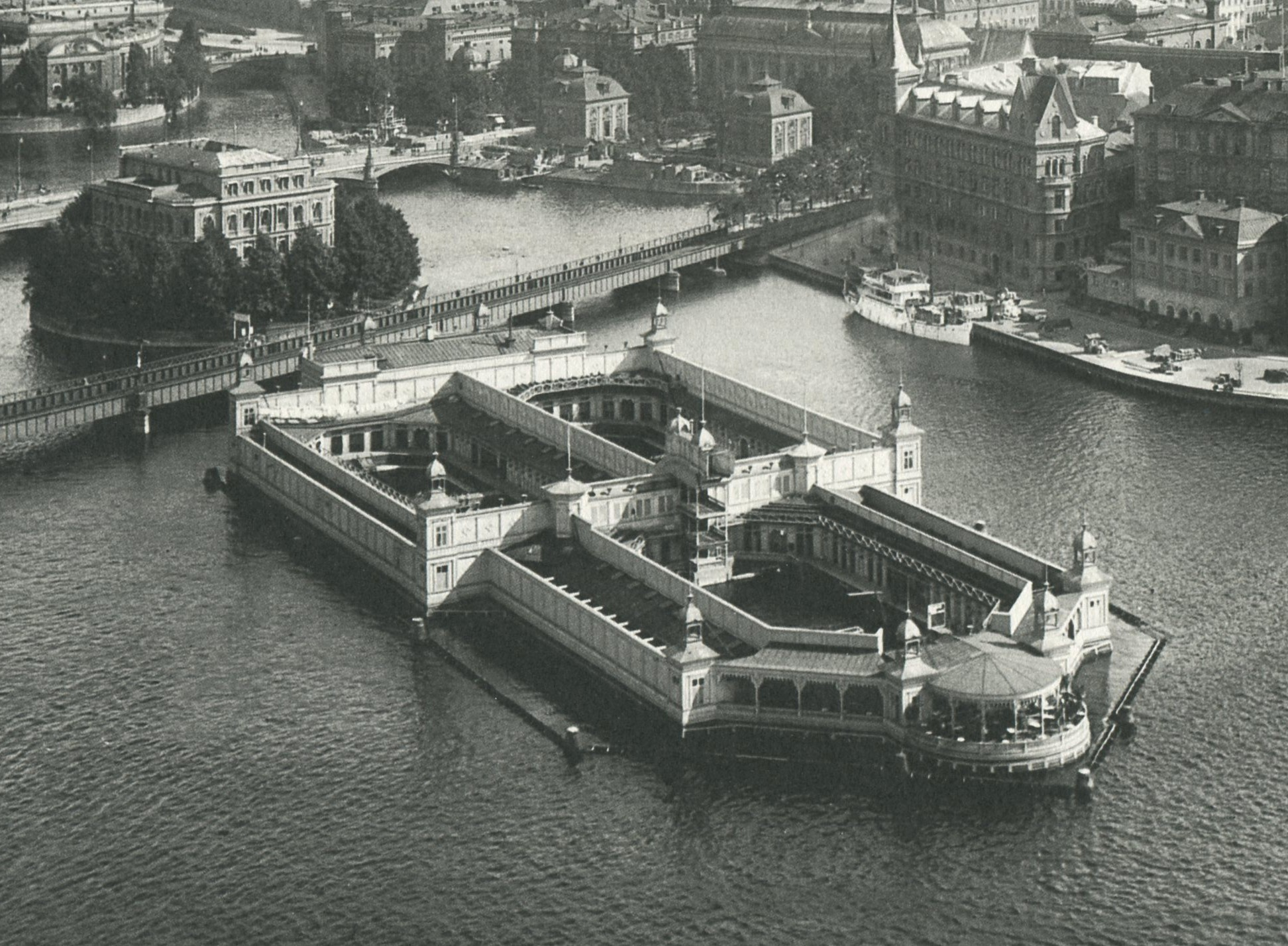
Strömbadet 1925

Strömbadet, officially Stockholms Bad- och Siminrättning i Norrström, was the first large cold bathhouse in Stockholm, located in Norrström, just north of Riddarholmen. It was opened in 1884 and was made entirely of wood in neo-Renaissance style designed by the architect brothers Axel Kumlien and Hjalmar Kumlien.

The baths opened in 1884 to replace Gjörckes on Riddarholmen. Strömbadet had several pools, among them the 39 metres (128 ft) men's pool. In 1933, the water of Norrström was considered unhealthy and bathing was prohibited, which lead to the building being demolished in 1936.

== Pictures ==
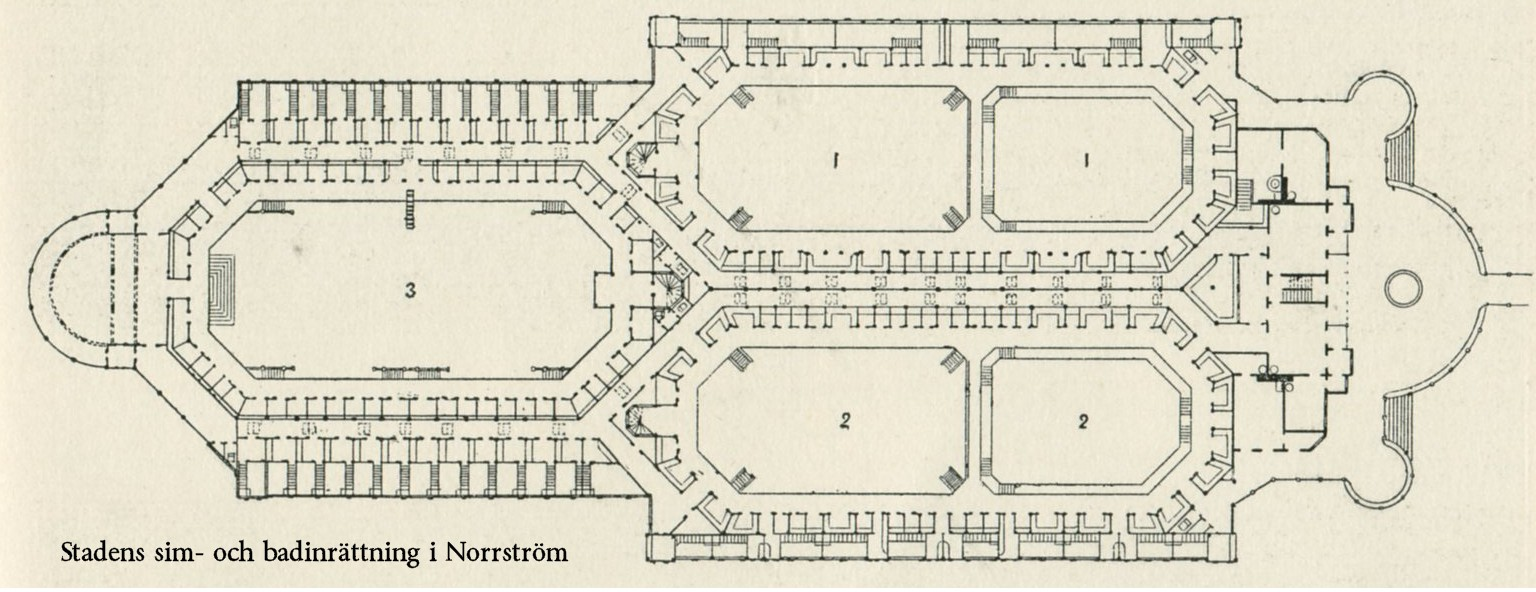
Floor plan of Strömbadet

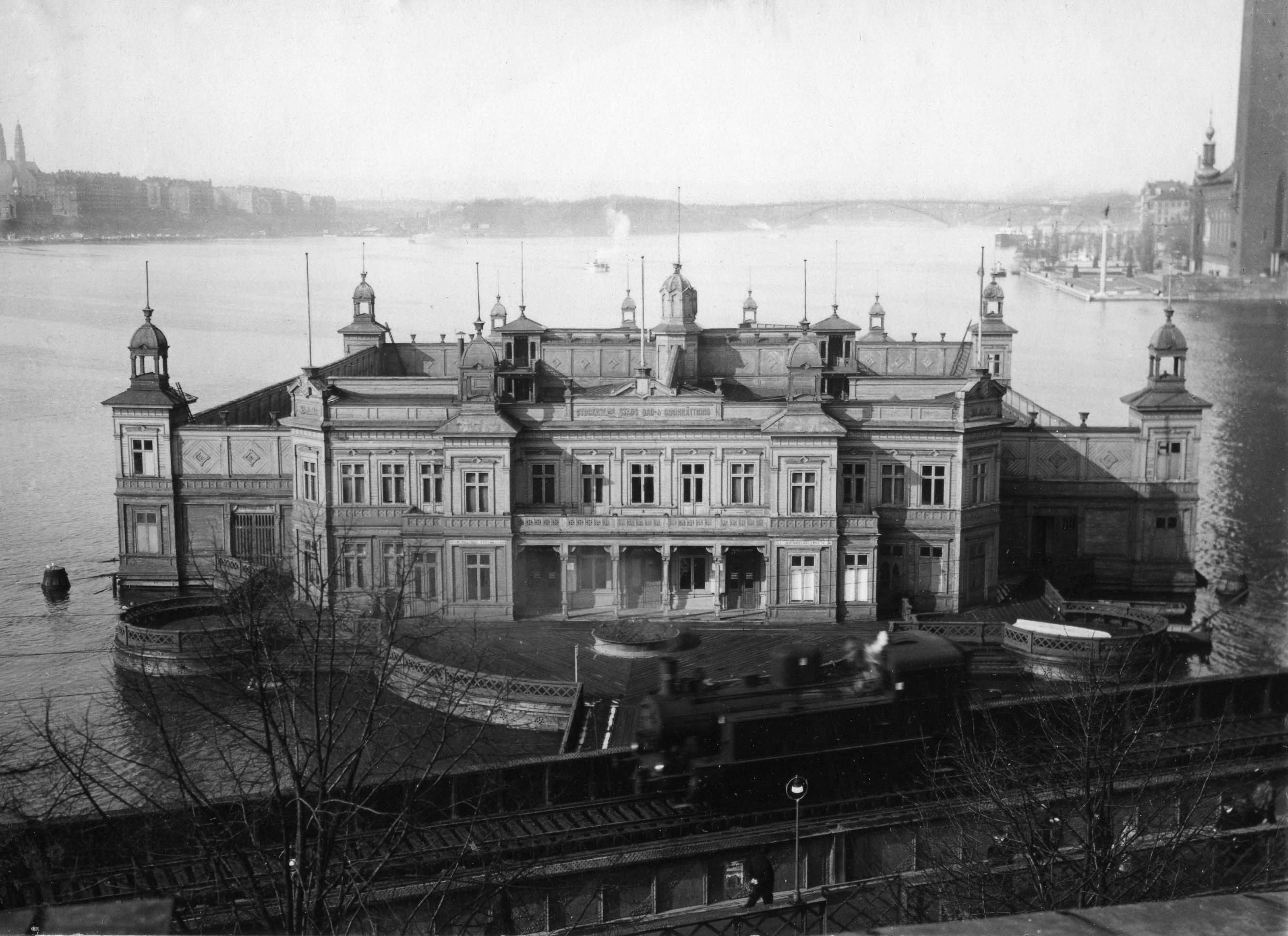
Strömbadet, view from the east before demolition in 1936.

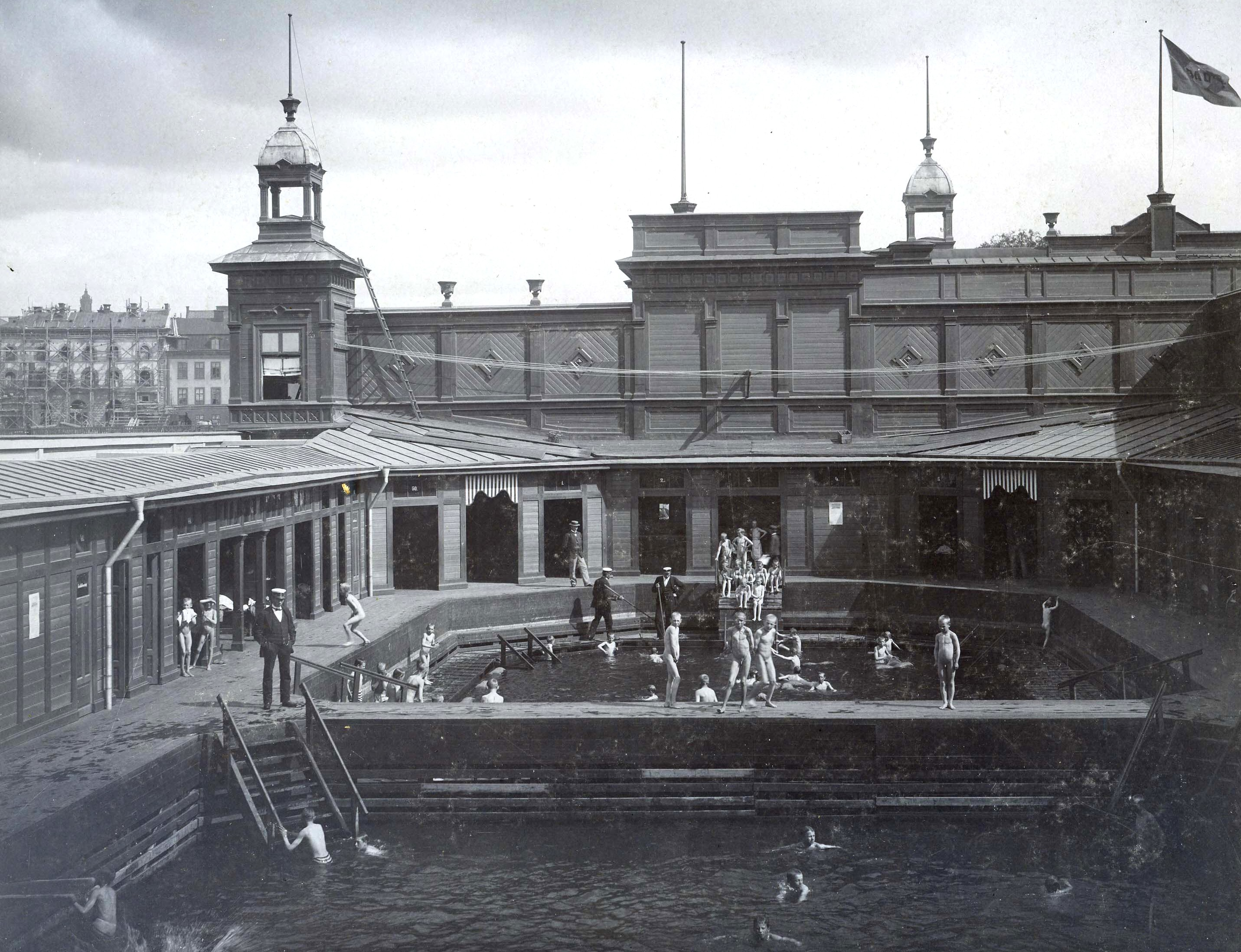
Strömbadet circa 1900

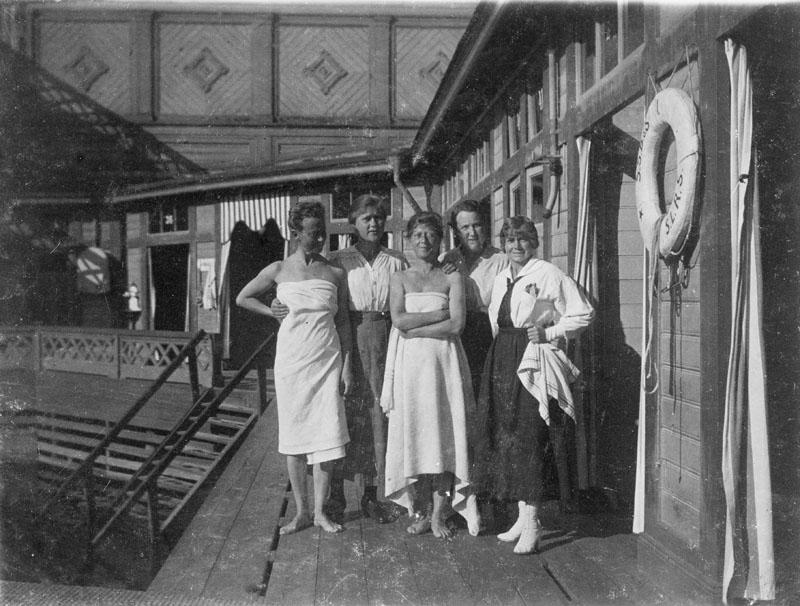
Women's section, 1918
