= Anna-Stina Wahlberg =

Swedish diver (1931–2020)

Personal information
- Full name: Anna-Stina Wahlberg-Baidinger
- Nationality: Swedish
- Born: 17 August 1931; Stockholm, Sweden
- Died: 17 February 2020 (aged 88); Stockholm, Sweden

Sport
- Sport: Diving

Anna-Stina Wahlberg (17 August 1931 – 17 February 2020) was a Swedish diver who represented her country at the 1952 and 1956 Summer Olympics and otherwise represented SK Neptun.
