= Runor Sandström =

Swedish water polo player

Personal information
- Born: June 12, 1909; Solna, Sweden
- Died: March 8, 1985 (aged 75); Nacka, Sweden

Sport
- Sport: Water polo

Runor "Pannan" Sandström (12 June 1909 – 8 March 1985) was a Swedish water polo player who competed in the 1936 Summer Olympics. In 1936, he was part of the Swedish team which finished seventh in the water polo tournament. He played three matches.

Sandström represented SK Neptun in swimming and waterpolo, and also shot putted for Djurgårdens IF.
