= Jenny Alversjö =

Swedish television presenter

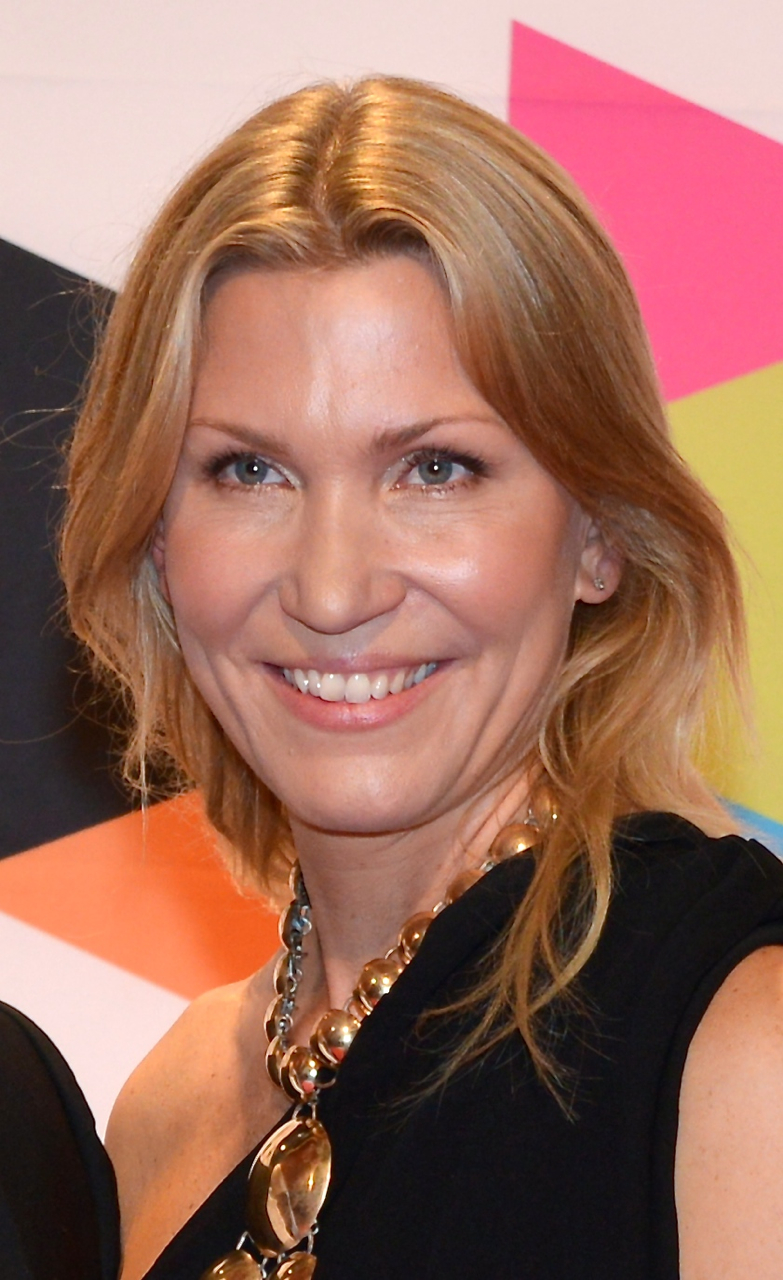
Jenny Alversjö in 2013

Jenny Maria Alversjö (born 5 February 1974) is a Swedish television presenter for TV4. She has presented the morning show Nyhetsmorgon at TV4, the show På bar gärning at Sjuan, and Spårlöst. She has competed in the national team in water polo. Since 2014, she has presented the show Kalla Fakta at TV4.
