= Helge Öberg =

Swedish diver (1906–1966)

Personal information
- Born: 25 February 1906 Stockholm, Sweden
- Died: 21 February 1966 (aged 59) Stockholm, Sweden

Sport
- Sport: Diving
- Club: Stockholms KK
Medal record
Representing Sweden
European Championships
| Silver medal – second place | 1926 Budapest | 10 m platform |

John Helge Öberg (25 February 1906 – 21 February 1966) was a Swedish diver who won a silver medal in the 10 m platform at the 1926 European Championships. He competed in this event at the 1924 and 1928 Olympics and finished sixth in 1924.
