= Nils Backlund =

Swedish water polo player

Personal information
- Born: 25 October 1896 Stockholm, Sweden
- Died: 3 December 1964 (aged 68) Stockholm, Sweden

Sport
- Sport: Water polo
Medal record
Representing Sweden
Olympic Games
Bronze medal – third place	1920 Antwerp	Team competition

Nils Robert Backlund (25 October 1896 – 3 December 1964) was a Swedish water polo player who competed in the 1920 Summer Olympics and in the 1924 Summer Olympics. In 1920 he was part of the Swedish team, which was able to win the bronze medal. In the 1924 water polo competition his team finished in fourth place.

At club level, Backlund represented SK Neptun.

== See also ==
- List of Olympic medalists in water polo (men)
