= Lars Skåål =

Swedish water polo player (1949–2022)

Personal information
- Full name: Lars Gunnar Skåål
- Nationality: Swedish
- Born: 14 September 1949; Örebro, Sweden
- Died: 4 May 2022 (aged 72); Örebro, Sweden

Sport
- Sport: Water polo

Lars Gunnar Skåål (14 September 1949 – 4 May 2022) was a Swedish water polo player. He competed in the men's tournament at the 1980 Summer Olympics.

At club level, Skåål represented Stockholms KK.
