= Eric Erickson (spy) =

American spy

Eric "Red" Erickson (December 31, 1889 – January 22, 1983) was a Swedish oil executive who worked as an operative for the Office of Strategic Services during World War II.

== Background ==
Erickson was born in 1889 in Brooklyn, New York State in the United States of America, the son of Swedish immigrants. After working in the oilfields of Texas, Erickson decided to get a college degree and go to work in the oil business. In order to start college and avoid the 1917 wartime draft, Erickson claimed to be seven years older than his actual age, and years later would invent a cover story that he served with the U.S. Army in World War I as an intelligence officer, although this was not true. After attending Cornell University at the suggestion of oil magnate Walter C. Teagle, Erickson graduated in 1921. After working for Standard Oil in Asia, Erickson moved to Sweden in 1924 and became a successful oil trader. During the mid-1930s, he renounced his U.S. citizenship and became a Swedish citizen.

== Espionage career ==
At the outbreak of World War II in 1939, Erickson continued his oil business with Nazi Germany, making millions of dollars in the process. After being placed on a wartime blacklist by the US in 1942 for collaboration with the enemy, Erickson was disowned by his brother in America. In order to clear his name, Erickson agreed to work for the Allies, and was given the code name 'Red' by U.S. intelligence. Pretending that he was a Nazi sympathizer interested in building a refinery in Sweden to process oil for Germany, he spied after 1942 German synthetic oil plants for the OSS, which used his information to provide targeting data for Allied bombing raids. Erickson visited Germany more than 30 times between 1939 and 1945. During his visits he fell in love with a German woman, Anne-Maria Freudenreich, who was shot by the Gestapo at Moabit Prison in 1945.

Alexander Klein wrote a 1958 book about Erickson's World War II exploits, The Counterfeit Traitor, which was made into a 1962 movie of the same name, starring William Holden in the role of 'Red' Erickson. While mostly accurate, the film included some invented material including Erickson's daring escape from Germany in 1945. Erickson himself appeared on "To Tell the Truth" June 3, 1958, to publicize the book, which also included some invented material such as his killing of a Gestapo agent.

== Death ==
Erickson died in Menton (France) January 22, 1983 of natural causes.
