= Bo Johnsson =

Swedish swimmer

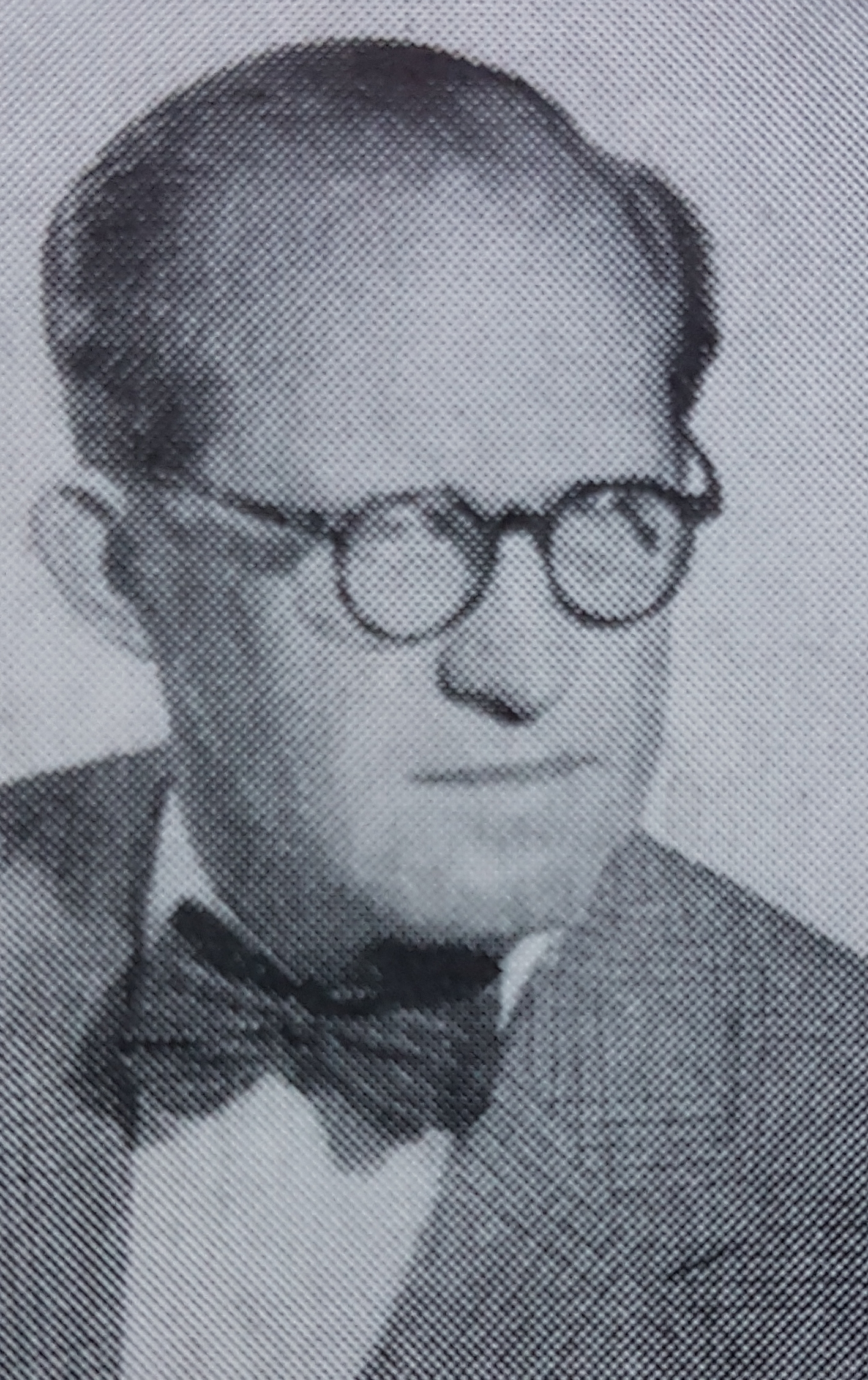

Personal information
- Full name: Bo Johan Edvard Magnus Johnsson
- Born: 5 September 1902 Falun, Sweden
- Died: 29 July 1981 (aged 78) Karlstad, Sweden

Sport
- Sport: Swimming
- Club: Stockholms KK

Bo Johan Edvard Magnus "Bosse" Johnsson (Bo Irvall) (5 September 1902 – 29 July 1981) was a Swedish swimmer. He competed in the men's 200 metre breaststroke event at the 1924 Summer Olympics.

Johnsson represented Stockholms KK.
