= Elsa Regnell =

Swedish diver (1889–1967)

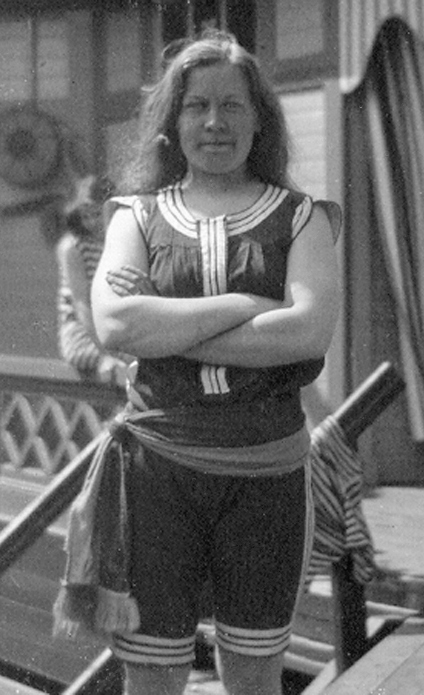

Personal information
- Born: 29 May 1889 Stockholm, Sweden
- Died: 1 January 1967 (aged 77) Stockholm, Sweden

Sport
- Sport: Diving
- Club: Stockholms KK

Elsa Albertina Regnell (later Holmberg, 29 May 1889 – 1 January 1967) was a Swedish diver. She competed in the 1912 Summer Olympics and finished fourth in the 10 m platform competition, behind her elder sister Lisa. Their brother Nils was an Olympic swimmer.
