= Erik Bergqvist =

Swedish sportsperson

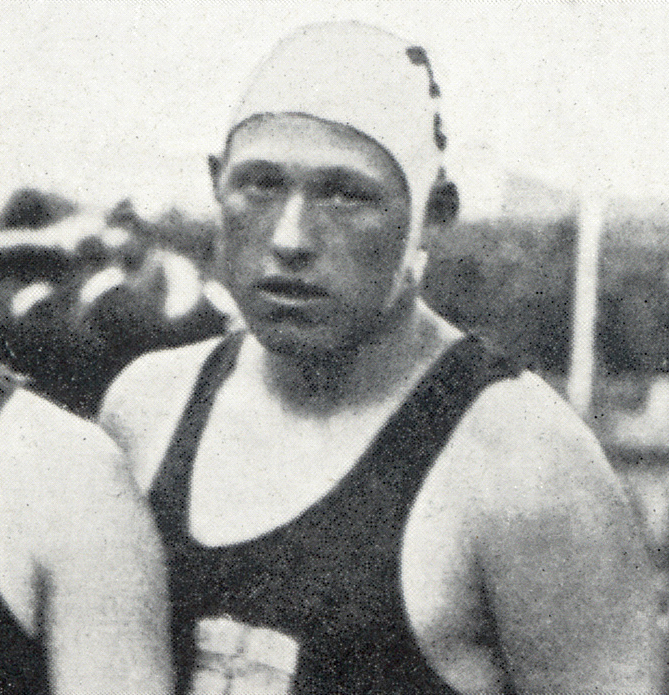
- Erik Bergqvist

Personal information
- Born: 20 June 1891 Stockholm, Sweden
- Died: 17 February 1954 (aged 62) Stockholm, Sweden

Sport
- Sport: Water polo
- Club: Stockholms KK
Medal record
Representing Sweden
Olympic Games
Silver medal – second place	1912 Stockholm	Team competition
Bronze medal – third place	1920 Antwerp	Team competition

Erik Gustaf "Berka" Bergqvist (20 June 1891 – 17 February 1954) was a Swedish water polo player and freestyle swimmer who competed in the 1912 and 1920 Summer Olympics, as well as an international footballer. He was part of the Swedish water polo teams that won silver and bronze medals, respectively. In 1912 he also competed in the 100 metre freestyle. As a swimmer and water polo player, he represented Stockholms KK.

Besides water sports, Bergqvist won a Swedish football title with AIK as a goalkeeper. He also football played for IFK Stockholm. He was one of three founders of the company AB Tipstjänst, which in 1934 received the state license to organize gambling and betting in sport, as those were going out of control in the 1920s–30s. The company was nationalized in 1943, and Bergqvist was offered the post of its director general, on condition that he joins the Swedish Social Democratic Party. He refused, and was appointed as inspector general instead.

== See also ==
- List of Olympic medalists in water polo (men)
