= Ann-Margret Nirling =

Swedish diver (1918–1999)

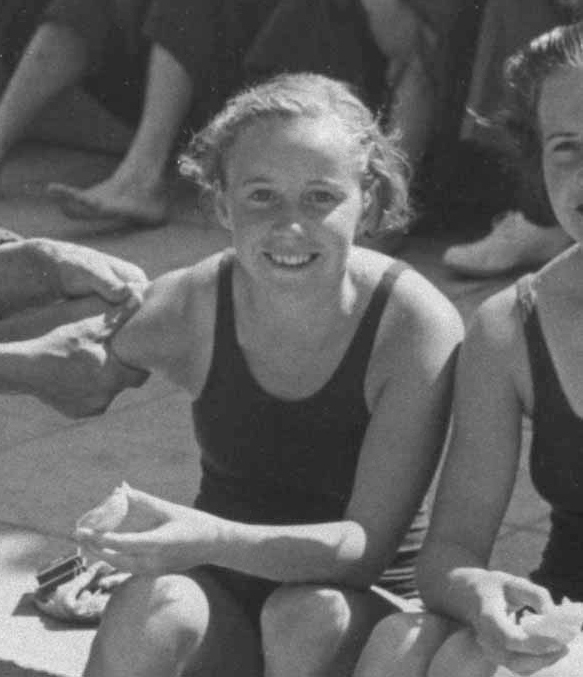
- Nirling at the 1936 Olympics

Personal information
- Born: 1 February 1918 Stockholm, Sweden
- Died: 3 February 1999 (aged 81) Vadstena, Sweden

Sport
- Sport: Diving
- Club: Stockholms KK
Medal record
Representing Sweden
European Championships
Silver medal – second place	1938 London	10 m platform

Ann-Margret Nirling (later Olsson, 1 February 1918 – 3 February 1999) was a Swedish diver. She competed in the 10 m platform at the 1936 Summer Olympics and finished tenth. Two years later she won a silver medal in this event at the 1938 European Championships.
