= Tore Lindzén =

Swedish water polo player

Personal information
- Born: 27 February 1914; Stockholm, Sweden
- Died: 23 January 2003 (aged 88); Kista, Sweden

Sport
- Sport: Water polo

Tore Albert Lindzén (27 February 1914 – 23 January 2003) was a Swedish water polo player who competed in the 1936 Summer Olympics.

Lindzén, born in Stockholm, was part of the Swedish team which finished seventh in the Water polo at the 1936 Summer Olympics, playing in three matches. He died in Kista on 23 January 2003.

At club level, Lindzén represented Stockholms KK.
