= Axel Runström =

Swedish water polo player

Personal information
- Born: October 15, 1883
- Died: August 10, 1943 (aged 59)

Sport
- Sport: Water polo, diving
Medal record
Representing Sweden
Olympic Games
Water polo
Bronze medal – third place	1908 London	Team competition

Axel Wilhelm Runström (15 October 1883 – 10 August 1943) was a Swedish water polo player and diver who competed in the 1908 Summer Olympics and in the 1912 Summer Olympics.

In 1908 he was part of the Swedish water polo team, which was able to win the bronze medal. But In the diving platform event he was eliminated in the first round. In 1912 he was eliminated in the first round of the 3 metre springboard event, but was able to finish sixth in the plain high diving competition.

Runström represented Stockholms KK.

== See also ==
- Dual sport and multi-sport Olympians
- List of Olympic medalists in water polo (men)
