= Harald Julin =

Swedish swimmer (1890–1967)

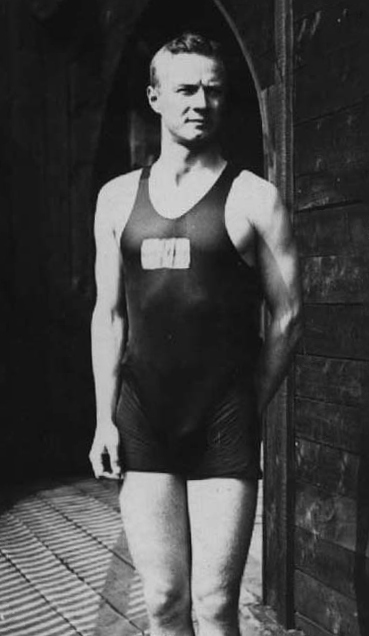

Personal information
- Born: 27 March 1890 Stockholm, Sweden
- Died: 31 July 1967 (aged 77) Stockholm, Sweden

Sport
- Sport: Swimming, water polo
- Club: Stockholms KK
Medal record
Representing Sweden
Swimming
Bronze medal – third place	1908 London	100 m freestyle
Water polo
Bronze medal – third place	1908 London	Team
Silver medal – second place	1912 Stockholm	Team
Bronze medal – third place	1920 Antwerp	Team

Harald Sigfrid Alexander Julin (27 March 1890 – 31 July 1967) was a Swedish swimmer and water polo player who competed at the 1906, 1908, 1912 and 1920 Olympics. In 100 m freestyle swimming he won a bronze medal in 1908, and failed to reach the finals in 1906 and 1912; he finished fifth in the 4×250 m freestyle relay in 1906. In water polo he won bronze medals in 1908 and 1920 and a silver at the 1912 Summer Olympics in his native Stockholm. His sons Åke and Rolf also became Olympic water polo players.

Julle came from a rich family. Besides water sports he was a fan of motor racing, working as a secretary of the Royal Automobile Club and helping organize several racing events. He later joined the national sports federation.

== See also ==
- Sweden men's Olympic water polo team records and statistics
- List of Olympic medalists in swimming (men)
- List of Olympic medalists in water polo (men)
