= Lisa Regnell =

Swedish diver (1887–1979)

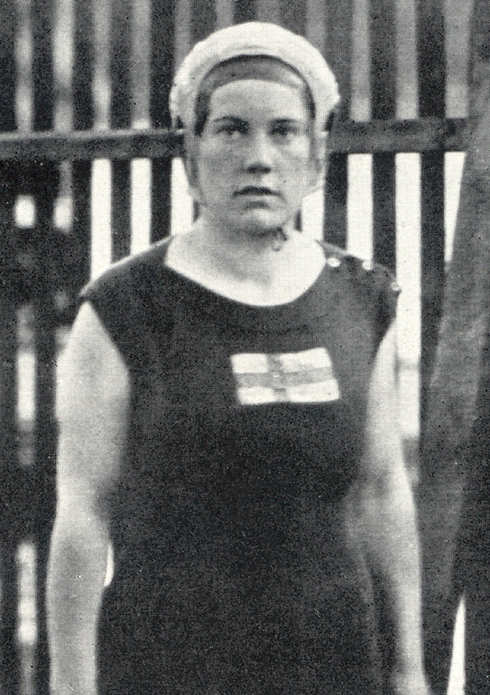

Personal information
- Born: 3 February 1887 Stockholm, Sweden
- Died: 5 November 1979 (aged 92) Enskede, Stockholm, Sweden

Sport
- Sport: Diving
- Club: Stockholms KK
Medal record
Representing Sweden
Olympic Games
Silver medal – second place	1912 Stockholm	10 m platform

Lisa Teresia Regnell (later Lindh; 3 February 1887 – 5 November 1979) was a Swedish diver who won the silver medal in the 10 m platform event at the 1912 Olympics. Her younger sister Elsa finished fourth in the same competition, while her elder brother Nils was an Olympic swimmer.

Regnell graduated as organist from a musical academy and was the first female member of the Swedish Swimming Federation in 1914–20. She was married to Sam Lindh, who was the treasurer of the same federation in 1918–32.
