= Stockholms KK =

Swedish swimming club

Club information
- Full name: Stockholms Kappsimningsklubb
- Nickname(s): Kappis
- Short name: SKK
- City: Stockholm
- Founded: 12 July 1895; 130 years ago
- Home pool(s): Eriksdalsbadet

Swimming
- Head coach: Anders Holmertz

Stockholms Kappsimningsklubb, commonly known as Stockholms KK or SKK, is a Swedish swimming club from Stockholm founded on 12 July 1895, who competes in swimming and water polo. The swimming club goes under the nickname Kappis. The most famous swimmers of SKK are the twin brothers Arne Borg and Åke Borg. SKK organizes yearly an invitational meet named after Arne Borg, Arne Borgs minne.

Stockholms KK resides in Eriksdalsbadet, Åkeshovs simhall, Nälstabadet, and Spångabadet.

== History ==
Founded in 1895, Stockholms KK was one of the first swimming clubs specialised in competitive swimming, where earlier had been running shows and swimming graduation ceremonies (Swedish: simpromotion), and organised the first Swedish Swimming Championships.

Stockholms KK had their first Olympic swimmer at the 1900 Summer Olympics, when Erik Eriksson participated.

Stockholms KK also had early success in Swedish swimming – by 1935, the club had taken half of the individual Swedish championship titles that had been contested. Stockholms KK swimmers won all the men's Swedish Swimming Championships titles in 100 metre freestyle between 1902 and 1914, all the first men's 200 metre freestyle events from 1915 to 1925, and all the men's 3 metre springboard diving titles between 1925 and 1942.

In 1972, SKK-Spårvägen was started by Spårvägens GoIF, Stockholms KK and Bromma SS and lasted during the decade – when it ended, the water polo team remained at Stockholms KK.

In 2016, Tero Välimaa was appointed swimming head coach for Stockholms KK.

In 2022, former Olympic swimmer Anders Holmertz was named swimming head coach for Stockholms KK.

== Athletes ==
=== Swimmers ===
Swimmers that have participated in the Summer Olympics while representing Stockholms KK:

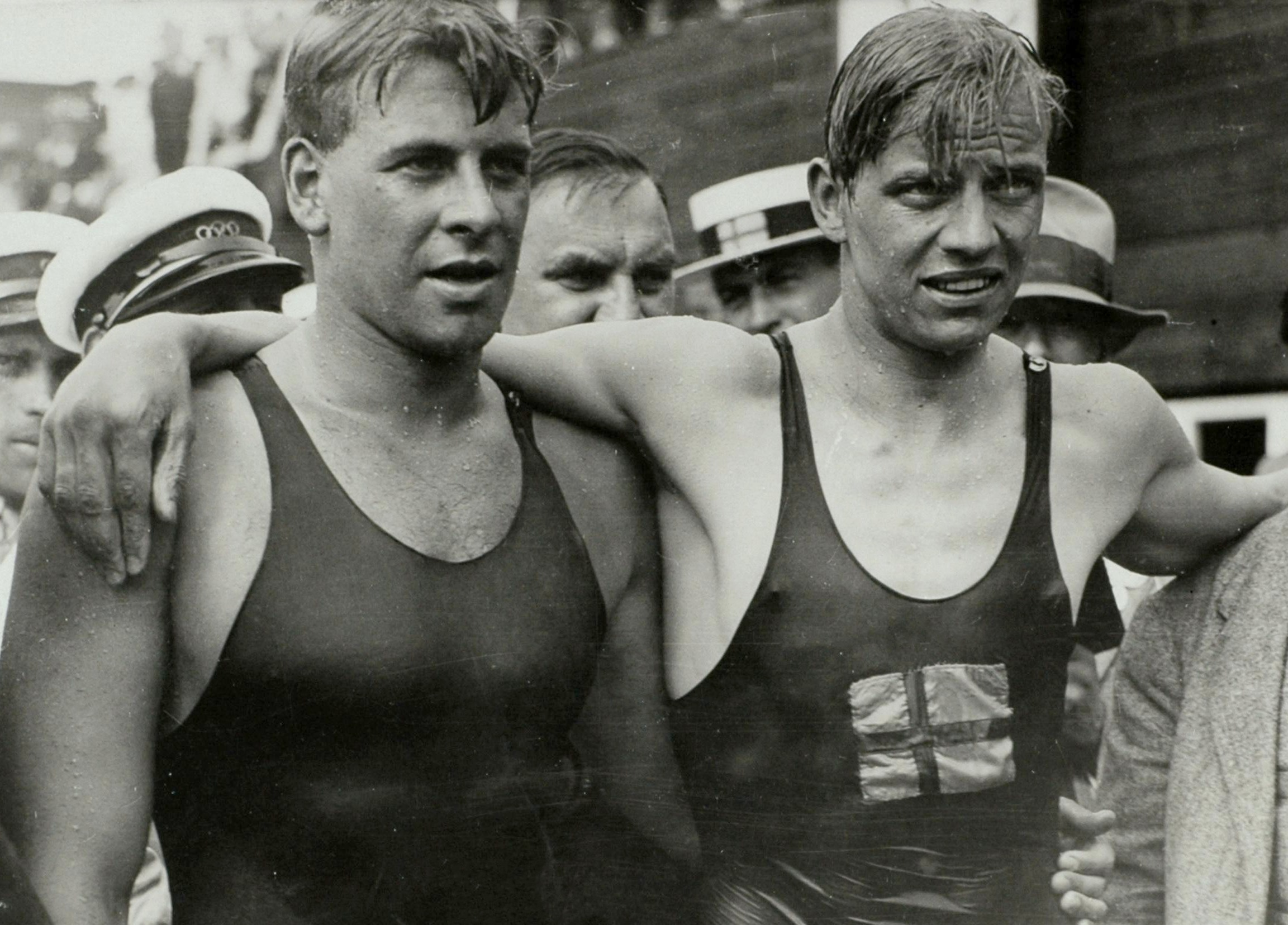
Stockholms KK swimmer Arne Borg (right) at the 1928 Olympics

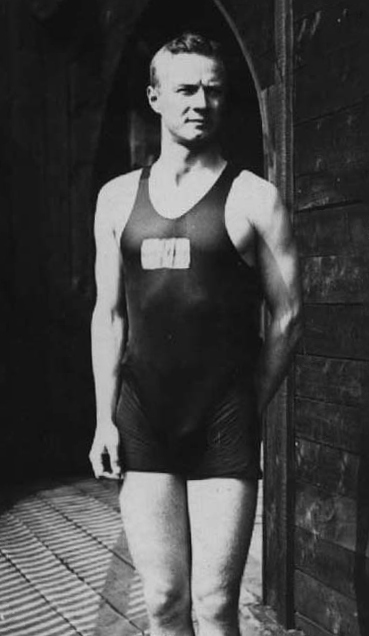
Stockholms KK swimmer and water polo player Harald Julin

- Adolf Andersson
- Erik Andersson
- Nils Andersson
- Robert Andersson
- Erik Bergqvist
- Elsa Björklund
- Sten-Olof Bolldén
- Åke Borg
- Arne Borg
- Gustav Collin
- Erik Eriksson
- Per Fjästad
- Aulo Gustafsson
- Nils-Erik Haglund
- Pontus Hanson
- Sven Hanson
- Erik Harling
- Sigfrid Heyner
- Sven von Holst
- Greta Johansson
- Hjalmar Johansson
- Bo Johnsson
- Sonja Johnsson
- Harald Julin
- Torsten Kumfeldt
- Göran Larsson
- Bengt Linders
- Carin Nilsson
- Gösta Persson
- Wilhelm Persson
- Bengt Rask
- Erik Skoglund
- Gunnar Sundman
- David Theander
- Vera Thulin
- Birgitta Wängberg
- Gunnar Wennerström
- Gunnar Werner

=== Divers ===
Divers that have participated in the Summer Olympics while representing Stockholms KK:

- Erik Adlerz
- Märta Adlerz
- Elsa Andersson
- Robert Andersson
- Selma Andersson
- Ernfrid Appelqvist
- Birte Christoffersen
- Ester Edström
- Ella Eklund
- Ernst Eklund
- Johnny Hellström
- Johan Jansson
- Alfred Johansson
- Gerda Johansson
- Greta Johansson
- Gunnar Johansson
- Hjalmar Johansson
- Märta Johansson
- Signe Johansson
- Svante Johansson
- Sigfrid Larsson
- Tora Larsson
- Edmund Lindmark
- Hilmer Löfberg
- Göran Lundqvist
- Dagmar Nilsson
- Ann-Margret Nirling
- Helge Öberg
- Toivo Öhman
- Gösta Ölander
- Ewa Olliwier
- Elsa Regnell
- Lisa Regnell
- Axel Runström
- Kerstin Rybrant
- Nils Skoglund
- Willy Thulin
- Erik Tjäder
- Gunnar Wingqvist

=== Water polo players ===
Water polo players that have participated in the Summer Olympics while representing Stockholms KK:

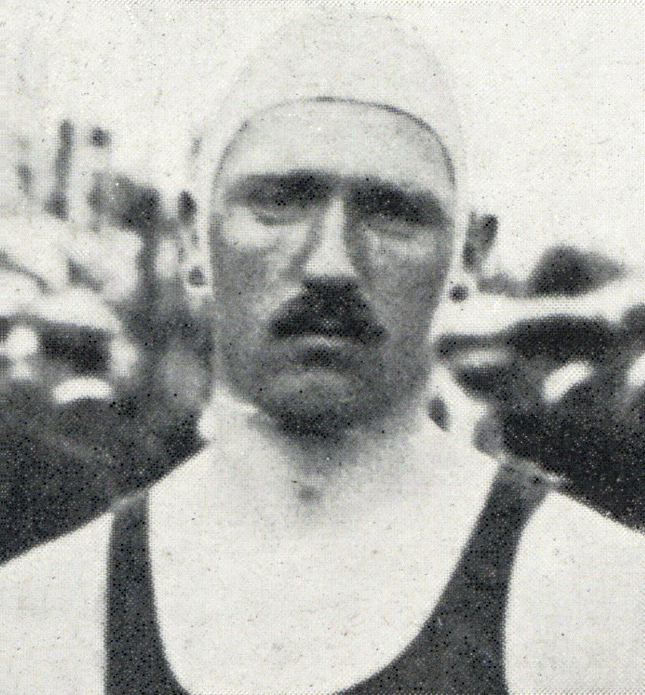
Stockholms KK swimmer and water polo player Pontus Hanson

- Erik Andersson
- Göte Andersson
- Robert Andersson
- Erik Bergqvist
- Erik Bergvall
- Tommy Danielson
- Pontus Hanson
- Åke Julin
- Harald Julin
- Rolf Julin
- Torsten Kumfeldt
- Tore Lindzén
- Åke Nauman
- Theodor Nauman
- Martin Norberg
- Gösta Persson
- Axel Runström
- Lars Skåål
- Gunnar Wennerström
