= Robert Andersson (water polo) =

Swedish water polo player (1886–1972)

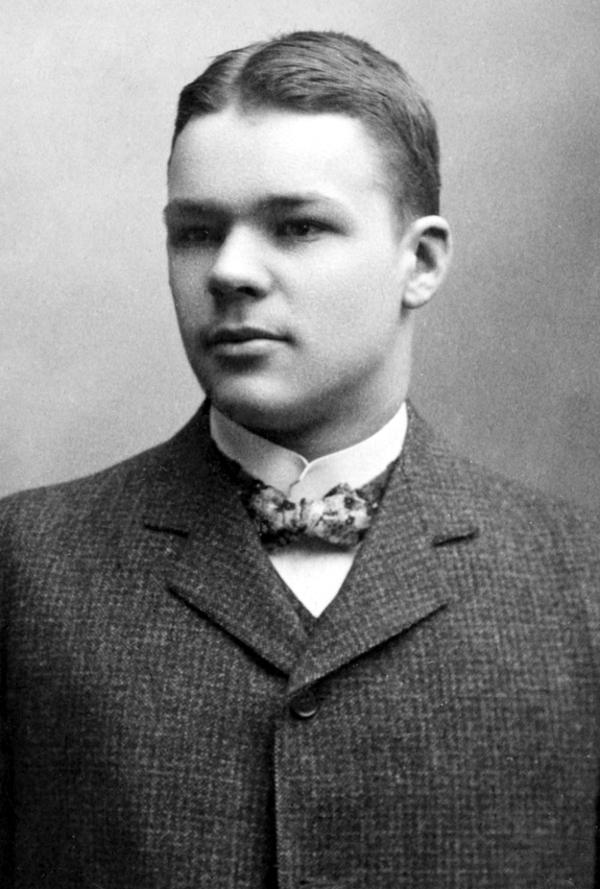

Personal information
- Born: October 18, 1886 Stockholm, Sweden
- Died: March 2, 1972 (aged 85) Stockholm, Sweden

Sport
- Sport: Swimming
Medal record
Representing Sweden
Olympic Games
Water polo
Silver medal – second place	1912 Stockholm	Team competition
Bronze medal – third place	1908 London	Team competition
Bronze medal – third place	1920 Antwerp	Team competition

Robert Theodor Andersson (18 October 1886 – 2 March 1972) was a Swedish water polo player, diver, and freestyle swimmer who competed in the 1906 Summer Olympics, in the 1908 Summer Olympics, in the 1912 Summer Olympics, and in the 1920 Summer Olympics.

He was part of the Swedish team, which was able to win three consecutive medals. He also competed in several swimming events from 1906 to 1920. In 1906, 1908 and 1912 he also participated in diving competitions.

At club level, Andersson represented Stockholms KK.

== See also ==
- Sweden men's Olympic water polo team records and statistics
- Dual sport and multi-sport Olympians
- List of Olympic medalists in water polo (men)
- World record progression 200 metres breaststroke
