= List of Olympic medalists in swimming (women) =

This is the complete list of women's Olympic medalists in swimming.

== Women's events ==
=== 50 metre freestyle ===
Games	Gold	Silver	Bronze
1988 Seoul	Kristin Otto; East Germany	Yang Wenyi; China	Katrin Meissner; East Germany
1988 Seoul	Kristin Otto; East Germany	Yang Wenyi; China	Jill Sterkel; United States
1992 Barcelona	Yang Wenyi; China	Zhuang Yong; China	Angel Martino; United States
1996 Atlanta	Amy Van Dyken; United States	Le Jingyi; China	Sandra Völker; Germany
2000 Sydney	Inge de Bruijn; Netherlands	Therese Alshammar; Sweden	Dara Torres; United States
2004 Athens	Inge de Bruijn; Netherlands	Malia Metella; France	Libby Lenton; Australia
2008 Beijing	Britta Steffen; Germany	Dara Torres; United States	Cate Campbell; Australia
2012 London	Ranomi Kromowidjojo; Netherlands	Aliaksandra Herasimenia; Belarus	Marleen Veldhuis; Netherlands
2016 Rio de Janeiro	Pernille Blume; Denmark	Simone Manuel; United States	Aliaksandra Herasimenia; Belarus
2020 Tokyo	Emma McKeon; Australia	Sarah Sjöström; Sweden	Pernille Blume; Denmark
2024 Paris	Sarah Sjöström; Sweden	Meg Harris; Australia	Zhang Yufei; China
2028 Los Angeles			

=== 100 metre freestyle ===
Games	Gold	Silver	Bronze
1912 Stockholm	Fanny Durack; Australasia	Wilhelmina Wylie; Australasia	Jennie Fletcher; Great Britain
1920 Antwerp	Ethelda Bleibtrey; United States	Irene Guest; United States	Frances Schroth; United States
1924 Paris	Ethel Lackie; United States	Mariechen Wehselau; United States	Gertrude Ederle; United States
1928 Amsterdam	Albina Osipowich; United States	Eleanor Garatti; United States	Joyce Cooper; Great Britain
1932 Los Angeles	Helene Madison; United States	Willy den Ouden; Netherlands	Eleanor Saville; United States
1936 Berlin	Rie Mastenbroek; Netherlands	Jeannette Campbell; Argentina	Gisela Arendt; Germany
1948 London	Greta Andersen; Denmark	Ann Curtis; United States	Marie-Louise Linssen-Vaessen; Netherlands
1952 Helsinki	Katalin Szőke; Hungary	Hannie Termeulen; Netherlands	Judit Temes; Hungary
1956 Melbourne	Dawn Fraser; Australia	Lorraine Crapp; Australia	Faith Leech; Australia
1960 Rome	Dawn Fraser; Australia	Chris von Saltza; United States	Natalie Steward; Great Britain
1964 Tokyo	Dawn Fraser; Australia	Sharon Stouder; United States	Kathy Ellis; United States
1968 Mexico City	Jan Henne; United States	Susan Pedersen; United States	Linda Gustavson; United States
1972 Munich	Sandy Neilson; United States	Shirley Babashoff; United States	Shane Gould; Australia
1976 Montreal	Kornelia Ender; East Germany	Petra Priemer; East Germany	Enith Brigitha; Netherlands
1980 Moscow	Barbara Krause; East Germany	Caren Metschuck; East Germany	Ines Diers; East Germany
1984 Los Angeles	Nancy Hogshead; United States	none awarded	Annemarie Verstappen; Netherlands
1984 Los Angeles	Carrie Steinseifer; United States	none awarded	Annemarie Verstappen; Netherlands
1988 Seoul	Kristin Otto; East Germany	Zhuang Yong; China	Catherine Plewinski; France
1992 Barcelona	Zhuang Yong; China	Jenny Thompson; United States	Franziska van Almsick; Germany
1996 Atlanta	Le Jingyi; China	Sandra Völker; Germany	Angel Martino; United States
2000 Sydney	Inge de Bruijn; Netherlands	Therese Alshammar; Sweden	Jenny Thompson; United States
2000 Sydney	Inge de Bruijn; Netherlands	Therese Alshammar; Sweden	Dara Torres; United States
2004 Athens	Jodie Henry; Australia	Inge de Bruijn; Netherlands	Natalie Coughlin; United States
2008 Beijing	Britta Steffen; Germany	Lisbeth Trickett; Australia	Natalie Coughlin; United States
2012 London	Ranomi Kromowidjojo; Netherlands	Aliaksandra Herasimenia; Belarus	Tang Yi; China
2016 Rio de Janeiro	Simone Manuel; United States	none awarded	Sarah Sjöström; Sweden
2016 Rio de Janeiro	Penny Oleksiak; Canada	none awarded	Sarah Sjöström; Sweden
2020 Tokyo	Emma McKeon; Australia	Siobhán Haughey; Hong Kong	Cate Campbell; Australia
2024 Paris	Sarah Sjöström; Sweden	Torri Huske; United States	Siobhán Haughey; Hong Kong
2028 Los Angeles			

=== 200 metre freestyle ===
Games	Gold	Silver	Bronze
1968 Mexico City	Debbie Meyer; United States	Jan Henne; United States	Jane Barkman; United States
1972 Munich	Shane Gould; Australia	Shirley Babashoff; United States	Keena Rothhammer; United States
1976 Montreal	Kornelia Ender; East Germany	Shirley Babashoff; United States	Enith Brigitha; Netherlands
1980 Moscow	Barbara Krause; East Germany	Ines Diers; East Germany	Carmela Schmidt; East Germany
1984 Los Angeles	Mary Wayte; United States	Cynthia Woodhead; United States	Annemarie Verstappen; Netherlands
1988 Seoul	Heike Friedrich; East Germany	Silvia Poll; Costa Rica	Manuela Stellmach; East Germany
1992 Barcelona	Nicole Haislett; United States	Franziska van Almsick; Germany	Kerstin Kielgass; Germany
1996 Atlanta	Claudia Poll; Costa Rica	Franziska van Almsick; Germany	Dagmar Hase; Germany
2000 Sydney	Susie O'Neill; Australia	Martina Moravcová; Slovakia	Claudia Poll; Costa Rica
2004 Athens	Camelia Potec; Romania	Federica Pellegrini; Italy	Solenne Figuès; France
2008 Beijing	Federica Pellegrini; Italy	Sara Isaković; Slovenia	Pang Jiaying; China
2012 London	Allison Schmitt; United States	Camille Muffat; France	Bronte Barratt; Australia
2016 Rio de Janeiro	Katie Ledecky; United States	Sarah Sjöström; Sweden	Emma McKeon; Australia
2020 Tokyo	Ariarne Titmus; Australia	Siobhán Haughey; Hong Kong	Penny Oleksiak; Canada
2024 Paris	Mollie O'Callaghan; Australia	Ariarne Titmus; Australia	Siobhán Haughey; Hong Kong
2028 Los Angeles			

=== 400 metre freestyle ===
Games	Gold	Silver	Bronze
1924 Paris	Martha Norelius; United States	Helen Wainwright; United States	Gertrude Ederle; United States
1928 Amsterdam	Martha Norelius; United States	Marie Braun; Netherlands	Josephine McKim; United States
1932 Los Angeles	Helene Madison; United States	Lenore Kight; United States	Jenny Maakal; South Africa
1936 Berlin	Rie Mastenbroek; Netherlands	Ragnhild Hveger; Denmark	Lenore Kight; United States
1948 London	Ann Curtis; United States	Karen Harup; Denmark	Catherine Gibson; Great Britain
1952 Helsinki	Valéria Gyenge; Hungary	Éva Novák; Hungary	Evelyn Kawamoto; United States
1956 Melbourne	Lorraine Crapp; Australia	Dawn Fraser; Australia	Sylvia Ruuska; United States
1960 Rome	Chris von Saltza; United States	Jane Cederqvist; Sweden	Tineke Lagerberg; Netherlands
1964 Tokyo	Ginny Duenkel; United States	Marilyn Ramenofsky; United States	Terri Stickles; United States
1968 Mexico City	Debbie Meyer; United States	Linda Gustavson; United States	Karen Moras; Australia
1972 Munich	Shane Gould; Australia	Novella Calligaris; Italy	Gudrun Wegner; East Germany
1976 Montreal	Petra Thümer; East Germany	Shirley Babashoff; United States	Shannon Smith; Canada
1980 Moscow	Ines Diers; East Germany	Petra Schneider; East Germany	Carmela Schmidt; East Germany
1984 Los Angeles	Tiffany Cohen; United States	Sarah Hardcastle; Great Britain	June Croft; Great Britain
1988 Seoul	Janet Evans; United States	Heike Friedrich; East Germany	Anke Möhring; East Germany
1992 Barcelona	Dagmar Hase; Germany	Janet Evans; United States	Hayley Lewis; Australia
1996 Atlanta	Michelle Smith; Ireland	Dagmar Hase; Germany	Kirsten Vlieghuis; Netherlands
2000 Sydney	Brooke Bennett; United States	Diana Munz; United States	Claudia Poll; Costa Rica
2004 Athens	Laure Manaudou; France	Otylia Jędrzejczak; Poland	Kaitlin Sandeno; United States
2008 Beijing	Rebecca Adlington; Great Britain	Katie Hoff; United States	Joanne Jackson; Great Britain
2012 London	Camille Muffat; France	Allison Schmitt; United States	Rebecca Adlington; Great Britain
2016 Rio de Janeiro	Katie Ledecky; United States	Jazmin Carlin; Great Britain	Leah Smith; United States
2020 Tokyo	Ariarne Titmus; Australia	Katie Ledecky; United States	Li Bingjie; China
2024 Paris	Ariarne Titmus; Australia	Summer McIntosh; Canada	Katie Ledecky; United States
2028 Los Angeles			

=== 800 metre freestyle ===
Games	Gold	Silver	Bronze
1968 Mexico City	Debbie Meyer; United States	Pam Kruse; United States	Maria Teresa Ramírez; Mexico
1972 Munich	Keena Rothhammer; United States	Shane Gould; Australia	Novella Calligaris; Italy
1976 Montreal	Petra Thümer; East Germany	Shirley Babashoff; United States	Wendy Weinberg; United States
1980 Moscow	Michelle Ford; Australia	Ines Diers; East Germany	Heike Dähne; East Germany
1984 Los Angeles	Tiffany Cohen; United States	Michele Richardson; United States	Sarah Hardcastle; Great Britain
1988 Seoul	Janet Evans; United States	Astrid Strauss; East Germany	Julie McDonald; Australia
1992 Barcelona	Janet Evans; United States	Hayley Lewis; Australia	Jana Henke; Germany
1996 Atlanta	Brooke Bennett; United States	Dagmar Hase; Germany	Kirsten Vlieghuis; Netherlands
2000 Sydney	Brooke Bennett; United States	Yana Klochkova; Ukraine	Kaitlin Sandeno; United States
2004 Athens	Ai Shibata; Japan	Laure Manaudou; France	Diana Munz; United States
2008 Beijing	Rebecca Adlington; Great Britain	Alessia Filippi; Italy	Lotte Friis; Denmark
2012 London	Katie Ledecky; United States	Mireia Belmonte García; Spain	Rebecca Adlington; Great Britain
2016 Rio de Janeiro	Katie Ledecky; United States	Jazmin Carlin; Great Britain	Boglárka Kapás; Hungary
2020 Tokyo	Katie Ledecky; United States	Ariarne Titmus; Australia	Simona Quadarella; Italy
2024 Paris	Katie Ledecky; United States	Ariarne Titmus; Australia	Paige Madden; United States
2028 Los Angeles			

=== 1500 metre freestyle ===
Games	Gold	Silver	Bronze
2020 Tokyo	Katie Ledecky; United States	Erica Sullivan; United States	Sarah Köhler; Germany
2024 Paris	Katie Ledecky; United States	Anastasiya Kirpichnikova; France	Isabel Gose; Germany
2028 Los Angeles			

=== 50 metre backstroke ===
Games	Gold	Silver	Bronze
2028 Los Angeles			

=== 100 metre backstroke ===
Games	Gold	Silver	Bronze
1924 Paris	Sybil Bauer; United States	Phyllis Harding; Great Britain	Aileen Riggin; United States
1928 Amsterdam	Marie Braun; Netherlands	Ellen King; Great Britain	Joyce Cooper; Great Britain
1932 Los Angeles	Eleanor Holm; United States	Bonnie Mealing; Australia	Valerie Davies; Great Britain
1936 Berlin	Nida Senff; Netherlands	Rie Mastenbroek; Netherlands	Alice Bridges; United States
1948 London	Karen Harup; Denmark	Suzanne Zimmerman; United States	Judy-Joy Davies; Australia
1952 Helsinki	Joan Harrison; South Africa	Geertje Wielema; Netherlands	Jean Stewart; New Zealand
1956 Melbourne	Judy Grinham; Great Britain	Carin Cone; United States	Margaret Edwards; Great Britain
1960 Rome	Lynn Burke; United States	Natalie Steward; Great Britain	Satoko Tanaka; Japan
1964 Tokyo	Cathy Ferguson; United States	Kiki Caron; France	Ginny Duenkel; United States
1968 Mexico City	Kaye Hall; United States	Elaine Tanner; Canada	Jane Swagerty; United States
1972 Munich	Melissa Belote; United States	Andrea Gyarmati; Hungary	Susie Atwood; United States
1976 Montreal	Ulrike Richter; East Germany	Birgit Treiber; East Germany	Nancy Garapick; Canada
1980 Moscow	Rica Reinisch; East Germany	Ina Kleber; East Germany	Petra Riedel; East Germany
1984 Los Angeles	Theresa Andrews; United States	Betsy Mitchell; United States	Jolanda de Rover; Netherlands
1988 Seoul	Kristin Otto; East Germany	Krisztina Egerszegi; Hungary	Cornelia Sirch; East Germany
1992 Barcelona	Krisztina Egerszegi; Hungary	Tünde Szabó; Hungary	Lea Loveless; United States
1996 Atlanta	Beth Botsford; United States	Whitney Hedgepeth; United States	Marianne Kriel; South Africa
2000 Sydney	Diana Mocanu; Romania	Mai Nakamura; Japan	Nina Zhivanevskaya; Spain
2004 Athens	Natalie Coughlin; United States	Kirsty Coventry; Zimbabwe	Laure Manaudou; France
2008 Beijing	Natalie Coughlin; United States	Kirsty Coventry; Zimbabwe	Margaret Hoelzer; United States
2012 London	Missy Franklin; United States	Emily Seebohm; Australia	Aya Terakawa; Japan
2016 Rio de Janeiro	Katinka Hosszú; Hungary	Kathleen Baker; United States	Fu Yuanhui; China
2016 Rio de Janeiro	Katinka Hosszú; Hungary	Kathleen Baker; United States	Kylie Masse; Canada
2020 Tokyo	Kaylee McKeown; Australia	Kylie Masse; Canada	Regan Smith; United States
2024 Paris	Kaylee McKeown; Australia	Regan Smith; United States	Katharine Berkoff; United States
2028 Los Angeles			

=== 200 metre backstroke ===
Games	Gold	Silver	Bronze
1968 Mexico City	Lillian Watson; United States	Elaine Tanner; Canada	Kaye Hall; United States
1972 Munich	Melissa Belote; United States	Susie Atwood; United States	Donna Gurr; Canada
1976 Montreal	Ulrike Richter; East Germany	Birgit Treiber; East Germany	Nancy Garapick; Canada
1980 Moscow	Rica Reinisch; East Germany	Cornelia Polit; East Germany	Birgit Treiber; East Germany
1984 Los Angeles	Jolanda de Rover; Netherlands	Amy White; United States	Anca Patrascoiu; Romania
1988 Seoul	Krisztina Egerszegi; Hungary	Katrin Zimmermann; East Germany	Cornelia Sirch; East Germany
1992 Barcelona	Krisztina Egerszegi; Hungary	Dagmar Hase; Germany	Nicole Stevenson; Australia
1996 Atlanta	Krisztina Egerszegi; Hungary	Whitney Hedgepeth; United States	Cathleen Rund; Germany
2000 Sydney	Diana Mocanu; Romania	Roxana Maracineanu; France	Miki Nakao; Japan
2004 Athens	Kirsty Coventry; Zimbabwe	Stanislava Komarova; Russia	Antje Buschschulte; Germany
2004 Athens	Kirsty Coventry; Zimbabwe	Stanislava Komarova; Russia	Reiko Nakamura; Japan
2008 Beijing	Kirsty Coventry; Zimbabwe	Margaret Hoelzer; United States	Reiko Nakamura; Japan
2012 London	Missy Franklin; United States	Anastasia Zuyeva; Russia	Elizabeth Beisel; United States
2016 Rio de Janeiro	Maya DiRado; United States	Katinka Hosszú; Hungary	Hilary Caldwell; Canada
2020 Tokyo	Kaylee McKeown; Australia	Kylie Masse; Canada	Emily Seebohm; Australia
2024 Paris	Kaylee McKeown; Australia	Regan Smith; United States	Kylie Masse; Canada
2028 Los Angeles			

=== 50 metre breaststroke ===
Games	Gold	Silver	Bronze
2028 Los Angeles			

=== 100 metre breaststroke ===
Games	Gold	Silver	Bronze
1968 Mexico City	Đurđica Bjedov; Yugoslavia	Galina Prozumenshchikova; Soviet Union	Sharon Wichman; United States
1972 Munich	Cathy Carr; United States	Galina Prozumenshchikova; Soviet Union	Beverley Whitfield; Australia
1976 Montreal	Hannelore Anke; East Germany	Lyubov Rusanova; Soviet Union	Marina Kosheveya; Soviet Union
1980 Moscow	Ute Geweniger; East Germany	Elvira Vasilkova; Soviet Union	Susanne Nielsson; Denmark
1984 Los Angeles	Petra van Staveren; Netherlands	Anne Ottenbrite; Canada	Catherine Poirot; France
1988 Seoul	Tanya Dangalakova; Bulgaria	Antoaneta Frenkeva; Bulgaria	Silke Hörner; East Germany
1992 Barcelona	Yelena Rudkovskaya; Unified Team	Anita Nall; United States	Samantha Riley; Australia
1996 Atlanta	Penelope Heyns; South Africa	Amanda Beard; United States	Samantha Riley; Australia
2000 Sydney	Megan Quann; United States	Leisel Jones; Australia	Penelope Heyns; South Africa
2004 Athens	Luo Xuejuan; China	Brooke Hanson; Australia	Leisel Jones; Australia
2008 Beijing	Leisel Jones; Australia	Rebecca Soni; United States	Mirna Jukić; Austria
2012 London	Rūta Meilutytė; Lithuania	Rebecca Soni; United States	Satomi Suzuki; Japan
2016 Rio de Janeiro	Lilly King; United States	Yuliya Yefimova; Russia	Katie Meili; United States
2020 Tokyo	Lydia Jacoby; United States	Tatjana Schoenmaker; South Africa	Lilly King; United States
2024 Paris	Tatjana Smith; South Africa	Tang Qianting; China	Mona McSharry; Ireland
2028 Los Angeles			

=== 200 metre breaststroke ===
Games	Gold	Silver	Bronze
1924 Paris	Lucy Morton; Great Britain	Agnes Geraghty; United States	Gladys Carson; Great Britain
1928 Amsterdam	Hilde Schrader; Germany	Mietje Baron; Netherlands	Charlotte Mühe; Germany
1932 Los Angeles	Clare Dennis; Australia	Hideko Maehata; Japan	Else Jacobsen; Denmark
1936 Berlin	Hideko Maehata; Japan	Martha Genenger; Germany	Inge Sørensen; Denmark
1948 London	Petronella van Vliet; Netherlands	Nancy Lyons; Australia	Éva Novák; Hungary
1952 Helsinki	Éva Székely; Hungary	Éva Novák; Hungary	Elenor Gordon; Great Britain
1956 Melbourne	Ursula Happe; United Team of Germany	Éva Székely; Hungary	Eva-Maria Elsen; United Team of Germany
1960 Rome	Anita Lonsbrough; Great Britain	Wiltrud Urselmann; United Team of Germany	Barbara Göbel; United Team of Germany
1964 Tokyo	Galina Prozumenshchikova; Soviet Union	Claudia Kolb; United States	Svetlana Babanina; Soviet Union
1968 Mexico City	Sharon Wichman; United States	Đurđica Bjedov; Yugoslavia	Galina Prozumenshchikova; Soviet Union
1972 Munich	Beverley Whitfield; Australia	Dana Schoenfield; United States	Galina Prozumenshchikova; Soviet Union
1976 Montreal	Marina Kosheveya; Soviet Union	Marina Yurchenya; Soviet Union	Lyubov Rusanova; Soviet Union
1980 Moscow	Lina Kačiušytė; Soviet Union	Svetlana Varganova; Soviet Union	Yuliya Bogdanova; Soviet Union
1984 Los Angeles	Anne Ottenbrite; Canada	Susan Rapp; United States	Ingrid Lempereur; Belgium
1988 Seoul	Silke Hörner; East Germany	Huang Xiaomin; China	Antoaneta Frenkeva; Bulgaria
1992 Barcelona	Kyoko Iwasaki; Japan	Lin Li; China	Anita Nall; United States
1996 Atlanta	Penelope Heyns; South Africa	Amanda Beard; United States	Ágnes Kovács; Hungary
2000 Sydney	Ágnes Kovács; Hungary	Kristy Kowal; United States	Amanda Beard; United States
2004 Athens	Amanda Beard; United States	Leisel Jones; Australia	Anne Poleska; Germany
2008 Beijing	Rebecca Soni; United States	Leisel Jones; Australia	Sara Nordenstam; Norway
2012 London	Rebecca Soni; United States	Satomi Suzuki; Japan	Yuliya Yefimova; Russia
2016 Rio de Janeiro	Rie Kaneto; Japan	Yuliya Yefimova; Russia	Shi Jinglin; China
2020 Tokyo	Tatjana Schoenmaker; South Africa	Lilly King; United States	Annie Lazor; United States
2024 Paris	Kate Douglass; United States	Tatjana Smith; South Africa	Tes Schouten; Netherlands
2028 Los Angeles			

=== 50 metre butterfly ===
Games	Gold	Silver	Bronze
2028 Los Angeles			

=== 100 metre butterfly ===
Games	Gold	Silver	Bronze
1956 Melbourne	Shelley Mann; United States	Nancy Ramey; United States	Mary Sears; United States
1960 Rome	Carolyn Schuler; United States	Marianne Heemskerk; Netherlands	Janice Andrew; Australia
1964 Tokyo	Sharon Stouder; United States	Ada Kok; Netherlands	Kathy Ellis; United States
1968 Mexico City	Lyn McClements; Australia	Ellie Daniel; United States	Susan Shields; United States
1972 Munich	Mayumi Aoki; Japan	Roswitha Beier; East Germany	Andrea Gyarmati; Hungary
1976 Montreal	Kornelia Ender; East Germany	Andrea Pollack; East Germany	Wendy Boglioli; United States
1980 Moscow	Caren Metschuck; East Germany	Andrea Pollack; East Germany	Christiane Knacke; East Germany
1984 Los Angeles	Mary T. Meagher; United States	Jenna Johnson; United States	Karin Seick; West Germany
1988 Seoul	Kristin Otto; East Germany	Birte Weigang; East Germany	Qian Hong; China
1992 Barcelona	Qian Hong; China	Crissy Ahmann-Leighton; United States	Catherine Plewinski; France
1996 Atlanta	Amy Van Dyken; United States	Liu Limin; China	Angel Martino; United States
2000 Sydney	Inge de Bruijn; Netherlands	Martina Moravcová; Slovakia	Dara Torres; United States
2004 Athens	Petria Thomas; Australia	Otylia Jędrzejczak; Poland	Inge de Bruijn; Netherlands
2008 Beijing	Lisbeth Trickett; Australia	Christine Magnuson; United States	Jessicah Schipper; Australia
2012 London	Dana Vollmer; United States	Lu Ying; China	Alicia Coutts; Australia
2016 Rio de Janeiro	Sarah Sjöström; Sweden	Penny Oleksiak; Canada	Dana Vollmer; United States
2020 Tokyo	Maggie Mac Neil; Canada	Zhang Yufei; China	Emma McKeon; Australia
2024 Paris	Torri Huske; United States	Gretchen Walsh; United States	Zhang Yufei; China
2028 Los Angeles			

=== 200 metre butterfly ===
Games	Gold	Silver	Bronze
1968 Mexico City	Ada Kok; Netherlands	Helga Lindner; East Germany	Ellie Daniel; United States
1972 Munich	Karen Moe; United States	Lynn Colella; United States	Ellie Daniel; United States
1976 Montreal	Andrea Pollack; East Germany	Ulrike Tauber; East Germany	Rosemarie Gabriel; East Germany
1980 Moscow	Ines Geissler; East Germany	Sybille Schönrock; East Germany	Michelle Ford; Australia
1984 Los Angeles	Mary T. Meagher; United States	Karen Phillips; Australia	Ina Beyermann; West Germany
1988 Seoul	Kathleen Nord; East Germany	Birte Weigang; East Germany	Mary T. Meagher; United States
1992 Barcelona	Summer Sanders; United States	Wang Xiaohong; China	Susie O'Neill; Australia
1996 Atlanta	Susie O'Neill; Australia	Petria Thomas; Australia	Michelle Smith; Ireland
2000 Sydney	Misty Hyman; United States	Susie O'Neill; Australia	Petria Thomas; Australia
2004 Athens	Otylia Jędrzejczak; Poland	Petria Thomas; Australia	Yuko Nakanishi; Japan
2008 Beijing	Liu Zige; China	Jiao Liuyang; China	Jessicah Schipper; Australia
2012 London	Jiao Liuyang; China	Mireia Belmonte García; Spain	Natsumi Hoshi; Japan
2016 Rio de Janeiro	Mireia Belmonte García; Spain	Madeline Groves; Australia	Natsumi Hoshi; Japan
2020 Tokyo	Zhang Yufei; China	Regan Smith; United States	Hali Flickinger; United States
2024 Paris	Summer McIntosh; Canada	Regan Smith; United States	Zhang Yufei; China
2028 Los Angeles			

=== 200 metre individual medley ===
Games	Gold	Silver	Bronze
1968 Mexico City	Claudia Kolb; United States	Susan Pedersen; United States	Jan Henne; United States
1972 Munich	Shane Gould; Australia	Kornelia Ender; East Germany	Lynn Vidali; United States
1976–1980	not included in the Olympic program		
1984 Los Angeles	Tracy Caulkins; United States	Nancy Hogshead; United States	Michele Pearson; Australia
1988 Seoul	Daniela Hunger; East Germany	Yelena Dendeberova; Soviet Union	Noemi Lung; Romania
1992 Barcelona	Lin Li; China	Summer Sanders; United States	Daniela Hunger; Germany
1996 Atlanta	Michelle Smith; Ireland	Marianne Limpert; Canada	Lin Li; China
2000 Sydney	Yana Klochkova; Ukraine	Beatrice Câșlaru; Romania	Cristina Teuscher; United States
2004 Athens	Yana Klochkova; Ukraine	Amanda Beard; United States	Kirsty Coventry; Zimbabwe
2008 Beijing	Stephanie Rice; Australia	Kirsty Coventry; Zimbabwe	Natalie Coughlin; United States
2012 London	Ye Shiwen; China	Alicia Coutts; Australia	Caitlin Leverenz; United States
2016 Rio de Janeiro	Katinka Hosszú; Hungary	Siobhan-Marie O'Connor; Great Britain	Maya DiRado; United States
2020 Tokyo	Yui Ohashi; Japan	Alex Walsh; United States	Kate Douglass; United States
2024 Paris	Summer McIntosh; Canada	Kate Douglass; United States	Kaylee McKeown; Australia
2028 Los Angeles			

=== 400 metre individual medley ===
Games	Gold	Silver	Bronze
1964 Tokyo	Donna de Varona; United States	Sharon Finneran; United States	Martha Randall; United States
1968 Mexico City	Claudia Kolb; United States	Lynn Vidali; United States	Sabine Steinbach; East Germany
1972 Munich	Gail Neall; Australia	Leslie Cliff; Canada	Novella Calligaris; Italy
1976 Montreal	Ulrike Tauber; East Germany	Cheryl Gibson; Canada	Becky Smith; Canada
1980 Moscow	Petra Schneider; East Germany	Sharron Davies; Great Britain	Agnieszka Czopek; Poland
1984 Los Angeles	Tracy Caulkins; United States	Suzanne Landells; Australia	Petra Zindler; West Germany
1988 Seoul	Janet Evans; United States	Noemi Lung; Romania	Daniela Hunger; East Germany
1992 Barcelona	Krisztina Egerszegi; Hungary	Lin Li; China	Summer Sanders; United States
1996 Atlanta	Michelle Smith; Ireland	Allison Wagner; United States	Krisztina Egerszegi; Hungary
2000 Sydney	Yana Klochkova; Ukraine	Yasuko Tajima; Japan	Beatrice Câșlaru; Romania
2004 Athens	Yana Klochkova; Ukraine	Kaitlin Sandeno; United States	Georgina Bardach; Argentina
2008 Beijing	Stephanie Rice; Australia	Kirsty Coventry; Zimbabwe	Katie Hoff; United States
2012 London	Ye Shiwen; China	Elizabeth Beisel; United States	Li Xuanxu; China
2016 Rio de Janeiro	Katinka Hosszú; Hungary	Maya DiRado; United States	Mireia Belmonte García; Spain
2020 Tokyo	Yui Ohashi; Japan	Emma Weyant; United States	Hali Flickinger; United States
2024 Paris	Summer McIntosh; Canada	Katie Grimes; United States	Emma Weyant; United States
2028 Los Angeles			

=== 4 × 100 metre freestyle relay ===
Games	Gold	Silver	Bronze
1912 Stockholm	Great Britain; Belle Moore; Jennie Fletcher; Annie Speirs; Irene Steer	Germany; Wally Dressel; Louise Otto; Hermine Stindt; Grete Rosenberg	Austria; Margarete Adler; Klara Milch; Josephine Sticker; Berta Zahourek
1920 Antwerp	United States; Margaret Woodbridge; Frances Schroth; Irene Guest; Ethelda Bleibtrey	Great Britain; Hilda James; Constance Jeans; Charlotte Radcliffe; Grace McKenzie	Sweden; Aina Berg; Emy Machnow; Carin Nilsson; Jane Gylling
1924 Paris	United States; Euphrasia Donnelly; Gertrude Ederle; Ethel Lackie; Mariechen Wehselau	Great Britain; Florence Barker; Constance Jeans; Grace McKenzie; Iris Tanner	Sweden; Aina Berg; Gurli Ewerlund; Wivan Pettersson; Hjördis Töpel
1928 Amsterdam	United States; Adelaide Lambert; Albina Osipowich; Eleanor Saville; Martha Norelius	Great Britain; Joyce Cooper; Iris Tanner; Cissie Stewart; Ellen King	South Africa; Rhoda Rennie; Freddie van der Goes; Mary Bedford; Kathleen Russell
1932 Los Angeles	United States; Helen Johns; Eleanor Saville; Josephine McKim; Helene Madison	Netherlands; Willy den Ouden; Puck Oversloot; Corrie Laddé; Maria Vierdag	Great Britain; Joyce Cooper; Valerie Davies; Edna Hughes; Helen Varcoe
1936 Berlin	Netherlands; Jopie Selbach; Tini Wagner; Willy den Ouden; Rie Mastenbroek	Germany; Ruth Halbsguth; Leni Lohmar; Ingeborg Schmitz; Gisela Arendt	United States; Katherine Rawls; Bernice Lapp; Mavis Freeman; Olive McKean
1948 London	United States; Marie Corridon; Thelma Kalama; Brenda Helser; Ann Curtis	Denmark; Eva Riise; Karen Harup; Greta Andersen; Fritze Carstensen	Netherlands; Irma Heijting-Schuhmacher; Margot Marsman; Marie-Louise Linssen-Vaessen; Hannie Termeulen
1952 Helsinki	Hungary; Ilona Novák; Judit Temes; Éva Novák; Katalin Szőke	Netherlands; Marie-Louise Linssen-Vaessen; Koosje van Voorn; Hannie Termeulen; Irma Heijting-Schuhmacher	United States; Jackie LaVine; Marilee Stepan; Jody Alderson; Evelyn Kawamoto
1956 Melbourne	Australia; Dawn Fraser; Faith Leech; Sandra Morgan; Lorraine Crapp	United States; Sylvia Ruuska; Shelley Mann; Nancy Simons; Joan Rosazza	South Africa; Natalie Myburgh; Susan Roberts; Moira Abernethy; Jeanette Myburgh
1960 Rome	United States; Joan Spillane; Shirley Stobs; Carolyn Wood; Chris von Saltza	Australia; Dawn Fraser; Ilsa Konrads; Lorraine Crapp; Alva Colquhoun	United Team of Germany; Christel Steffin; Heidi Pechstein; Gisela Weiss; Ursula Brunner
1964 Tokyo	United States; Sharon Stouder; Donna de Varona; Lillian Watson; Kathy Ellis	Australia; Robyn Thorn; Janice Murphy; Lynette Bell; Dawn Fraser	Netherlands; Pauline van der Wildt; Toos Beumer; Winnie van Weerdenburg; Erica Terpstra
1968 Mexico City	United States; Jane Barkman; Linda Gustavson; Susan Pedersen; Jan Henne	East Germany; Gabriele Wetzko; Roswitha Krause; Uta Schmuck; Martina Grunert	Canada; Angela Coughlan; Marilyn Corson; Elaine Tanner; Marion Lay
1972 Munich	United States; Shirley Babashoff; Jane Barkman; Jenny Kemp; Sandy Neilson	East Germany; Andrea Eife; Kornelia Ender; Elke Sehmisch; Gabriele Wetzko	West Germany; Gudrun Beckmann; Heidemarie Reineck; Angela Steinbach; Jutta Weber
1976 Montreal	United States; Kim Peyton; Jill Sterkel; Shirley Babashoff; Wendy Boglioli	East Germany; Petra Priemer; Kornelia Ender; Claudia Hempel; Andrea Pollack	Canada; Becky Smith; Gail Amundrud; Barbara Clark; Anne Jardin
1980 Moscow	East Germany; Barbara Krause; Caren Metschuck; Ines Diers; Sarina Hülsenbeck	Sweden; Carina Ljungdahl; Tina Gustafsson; Agneta Mårtensson; Agneta Eriksson	Netherlands; Conny van Bentum; Wilma van Velsen; Reggie de Jong; Annelies Maas
1984 Los Angeles	United States; Jenna Johnson; Carrie Steinseifer; Dara Torres; Nancy Hogshead	Netherlands; Annemarie Verstappen; Desi Reijers; Elles Voskes; Conny van Bentum	West Germany; Iris Zscherpe; Susanne Schuster; Christiane Pielke; Karin Seick
1988 Seoul	East Germany; Kristin Otto; Katrin Meissner; Daniela Hunger; Manuela Stellmach	Netherlands; Marianne Muis; Mildred Muis; Conny van Bentum; Karin Brienesse	United States; Mary Wayte; Mitzi Kremer; Laura Walker; Dara Torres
1992 Barcelona	United States; Nicole Haislett; Angel Martino; Jenny Thompson; Dara Torres; Ashley Tappin; Crissy Ahmann-Leighton	China; Le Jingyi; Lü Bin; Zhuang Yong; Yang Wenyi; Zhao Kun	Germany; Franziska van Almsick; Daniela Hunger; Simone Osygus; Manuela Stellmach; Kerstin Kielgass; Annette Hadding
1996 Atlanta	United States; Angel Martino; Amy Van Dyken; Catherine Fox; Jenny Thompson; Lisa Jacob; Melanie Valerio	China; Le Jingyi; Chao Na; Nian Yun; Shan Ying	Germany; Sandra Völker; Simone Osygus; Antje Buschschulte; Franziska van Almsick; Meike Freitag
2000 Sydney	United States; Amy Van Dyken; Courtney Shealy; Jenny Thompson; Dara Torres; Erin Phenix; Ashley Tappin	Netherlands; Manon van Rooijen; Wilma van Hofwegen; Inge de Bruijn; Thamar Henneken; Chantal Groot	Sweden; Johanna Sjöberg; Therese Alshammar; Louise Jöhncke; Anna-Karin Kammerling; Josefin Lillhage; Malin Svahnström
2004 Athens	Australia; Alice Mills; Libby Lenton; Petria Thomas; Jodie Henry; Sarah Ryan	United States; Kara Lynn Joyce; Natalie Coughlin; Amanda Weir; Jenny Thompson; Colleen Lanne; Maritza Correia; Lindsay Benko	Netherlands; Chantal Groot; Inge Dekker; Marleen Veldhuis; Inge de Bruijn; Annabel Kosten
2008 Beijing	Netherlands; Inge Dekker; Ranomi Kromowidjojo; Femke Heemskerk; Marleen Veldhuis; Hinkelien Schreuder; Manon van Rooijen	United States; Natalie Coughlin; Dara Torres; Kara Lynn Joyce; Lacey Nymeyer; Emily Silver; Julia Smit	Australia; Cate Campbell; Alice Mills; Melanie Schlanger; Lisbeth Trickett; Shayne Reese
2012 London	Australia; Alicia Coutts; Cate Campbell; Brittany Elmslie; Melanie Schlanger; Emily Seebohm; Yolane Kukla; Lisbeth Trickett	Netherlands; Inge Dekker; Marleen Veldhuis; Femke Heemskerk; Ranomi Kromowidjojo; Hinkelien Schreuder	United States; Missy Franklin; Jessica Hardy; Lia Neal; Allison Schmitt; Amanda Weir; Natalie Coughlin
2016 Rio de Janeiro	Australia; Emma McKeon; Brittany Elmslie; Bronte Campbell; Cate Campbell; Madison Wilson	United States; Simone Manuel; Abbey Weitzeil; Dana Vollmer; Katie Ledecky; Amanda Weir; Lia Neal; Allison Schmitt	Canada; Sandrine Mainville; Chantal Van Landeghem; Taylor Ruck; Penny Oleksiak; Michelle Williams
2020 Tokyo	Australia; Bronte Campbell; Meg Harris; Emma McKeon; Cate Campbell; Mollie O'Callaghan; Madison Wilson	Canada; Kayla Sanchez; Margaret MacNeil; Rebecca Smith; Penny Oleksiak; Taylor Ruck	United States; Erika Brown; Abbey Weitzeil; Natalie Hinds; Simone Manuel; Olivia Smoliga; Catie DeLoof; Allison Schmitt
2024 Paris	Australia; Mollie O'Callaghan; Shayna Jack; Emma McKeon; Meg Harris; Olivia Wunsch; Bronte Campbell	United States; Kate Douglass; Gretchen Walsh; Torri Huske; Simone Manuel; Abbey Weitzeil; Erika Connolly	China; Yang Junxuan; Cheng Yujie; Zhang Yufei; Wu Qingfeng; Yu Yiting
2028 Los Angeles			

Note: since 1984, swimmers who swam only in preliminary rounds also received medals.

=== 4 × 200 metre freestyle relay ===
Games	Gold	Silver	Bronze
1996 Atlanta	United States; Trina Jackson; Cristina Teuscher; Sheila Taormina; Jenny Thompson; Lisa Jacob; Annette Salmeen; Ashley Whitney	Germany; Franziska van Almsick; Kerstin Kielgass; Anke Scholz; Dagmar Hase; Meike Freitag; Simone Osygus	Australia; Julia Greville; Nicole Stevenson; Emma Johnson; Susie O'Neill; Lise Mackie
2000 Sydney	United States; Diana Munz; Jenny Thompson; Samantha Arsenault; Lindsay Benko; Julia Stowers; Kim Black	Australia; Giaan Rooney; Petria Thomas; Kirsten Thomson; Susie O'Neill; Jacinta van Lint; Elka Graham	Germany; Franziska van Almsick; Antje Buschschulte; Sara Harstick; Kerstin Kielgass; Meike Freitag; Britta Steffen
2004 Athens	United States; Natalie Coughlin; Carly Piper; Dana Vollmer; Kaitlin Sandeno; Lindsay Benko; Rhi Jeffrey; Rachel Komisarz	China; Zhu Yingwen; Xu Yanwei; Yang Yu; Pang Jiaying; Li Ji	Germany; Franziska van Almsick; Petra Dallmann; Antje Buschschulte; Hannah Stockbauer; Janina Götz; Sara Harstick
2008 Beijing	Australia; Stephanie Rice; Bronte Barratt; Kylie Palmer; Linda Mackenzie; Felicity Galvez; Angie Bainbridge; Melanie Schlanger; Lara Davenport	China; Yang Yu; Zhu Qianwei; Tan Miao; Pang Jiaying; Tang Jingzhi	United States; Allison Schmitt; Natalie Coughlin; Caroline Burckle; Katie Hoff; Christine Marshall; Kim Vandenberg; Julia Smit
2012 London	United States; Missy Franklin; Dana Vollmer; Shannon Vreeland; Allison Schmitt; Lauren Perdue; Alyssa Anderson	Australia; Bronte Barratt; Melanie Schlanger; Kylie Palmer; Alicia Coutts; Brittany Elmslie; Angie Bainbridge; Jade Neilsen; Blair Evans	France; Camille Muffat; Charlotte Bonnet; Ophélie-Cyrielle Étienne; Coralie Balmy; Margaux Farrell; Mylène Lazare
2016 Rio de Janeiro	United States; Allison Schmitt; Leah Smith; Maya DiRado; Katie Ledecky; Missy Franklin; Melanie Margalis; Cierra Runge	Australia; Leah Neale; Emma McKeon; Bronte Barratt; Tamsin Cook; Jessica Ashwood	Canada; Katerine Savard; Taylor Ruck; Brittany MacLean; Penny Oleksiak; Emily Overholt; Kennedy Goss
2020 Tokyo	China; Yang Junxuan; Tang Muhan; Zhang Yufei; Li Bingjie; Zhang Yifan; Dong Jie	United States; Allison Schmitt; Paige Madden; Katie McLaughlin; Katie Ledecky; Bella Sims; Brooke Forde	Australia; Ariarne Titmus; Emma McKeon; Madison Wilson; Leah Neale; Mollie O'Callaghan; Meg Harris; Brianna Throssell; Tamsin Cook
2024 Paris	Australia; Mollie O'Callaghan; Lani Pallister; Brianna Throssell; Ariarne Titmus; Jamie Perkins; Shayna Jack	United States; Claire Weinstein; Paige Madden; Katie Ledecky; Erin Gemmell; Anna Peplowski; Simone Manuel; Alex Shackell	China; Yang Junxuan; Li Bingjie; Ge Chutong; Liu Yaxin; Tang Muhan; Kong Yaqi
2028 Los Angeles			

Note: swimmers who swam only in preliminary rounds also received medals.

=== 4 × 100 metre medley relay ===
Games	Gold	Silver	Bronze
1960 Rome	United States; Lynn Burke; Patty Kempner; Carolyn Schuler; Chris von Saltza	Australia; Marilyn Wilson; Rosemary Lassig; Jan Andrew; Dawn Fraser	United Team of Germany; Ingrid Schmidt; Ursula Küper; Bärbel Fuhrmann; Ursel Brunner
1964 Tokyo	United States; Cathy Ferguson; Cynthia Goyette; Sharon Stouder; Kathy Ellis	Netherlands; Corrie Winkel; Klenie Bimolt; Ada Kok; Erica Terpstra	Soviet Union; Tatyana Savelyeva; Svetlana Babanina; Tatyana Devyatova; Natalya Ustinova
1968 Mexico City	United States; Kaye Hall; Catie Ball; Ellie Daniel; Susan Pedersen	Australia; Lynne Watson; Judy Playfair; Lyn McClements; Janet Steinbeck	West Germany; Angelika Kraus; Uta Frommater; Heike Hustede; Heidemarie Reineck
1972 Munich	United States; Melissa Belote; Cathy Carr; Deena Deardurff; Sandy Neilson	East Germany; Christine Herbst; Renate Vogel; Roswitha Beier; Kornelia Ender	West Germany; Gudrun Beckmann; Vreni Eberle; Silke Pielen; Heidemarie Reineck
1976 Montreal	East Germany; Ulrike Richter; Hannelore Anke; Kornelia Ender; Andrea Pollack	United States; Camille Wright; Shirley Babashoff; Linda Jezek; Lauri Siering	Canada; Susan Sloan; Robin Corsiglia; Wendy Hogg; Anne Jardin
1980 Moscow	East Germany; Rica Reinisch; Ute Geweniger; Andrea Pollack; Caren Metschuck	Great Britain; Helen Jameson; Margaret Kelly; Ann Osgerby; June Croft	Soviet Union; Yelena Kruglova; Elvira Vasilkova; Alla Grishchenkova; Natalya Strunnikova
1984 Los Angeles	United States; Theresa Andrews; Tracy Caulkins; Mary T. Meagher; Nancy Hogshead	West Germany; Svenja Schlicht; Ute Hasse; Ina Beyermann; Karin Seick	Canada; Reema Abdo; Anne Ottenbrite; Michelle MacPherson; Pamela Rai
1988 Seoul	East Germany; Kristin Otto; Silke Hörner; Birte Weigang; Katrin Meissner	United States; Beth Barr; Tracey McFarlane; Janel Jorgensen; Mary Wayte	Canada; Lori Melien; Allison Higson; Jane Kerr; Andrea Nugent
1992 Barcelona	United States; Crissy Ahmann-Leighton; Lea Loveless; Anita Nall; Jenny Thompson; Janie Wagstaff; Megan Kleine; Summer Sanders; Nicole Haislett	Germany; Franziska van Almsick; Jana Dörries; Dagmar Hase; Daniela Hunger; Daniela Brendel; Bettina Ustrowski; Simone Osygus	Unified Team; Nina Zhivanevskaya; Olga Kirichenko; Natalya Meshcheryakova; Yelena Rudkovskaya; Yelena Shubina
1996 Atlanta	United States; Beth Botsford; Amanda Beard; Angel Martino; Amy Van Dyken; Catherine Fox; Whitney Hedgepeth; Kristine Quance; Jenny Thompson	Australia; Nicole Stevenson; Samantha Riley; Susie O'Neill; Sarah Ryan; Helen Denman; Angela Kennedy	China; Chen Yan; Han Xue; Cai Huijue; Shan Ying
2000 Sydney	United States; Dara Torres; Barbara Bedford; Megan Quann; Jenny Thompson; Courtney Shealy; Ashley Tappin; Amy Van Dyken; Staciana Stitts	Australia; Petria Thomas; Leisel Jones; Susie O'Neill; Dyana Calub; Giaan Rooney; Tarnee White; Sarah Ryan	Japan; Masami Tanaka; Sumika Minamoto; Mai Nakamura; Junko Onishi
2004 Athens	Australia; Giaan Rooney; Leisel Jones; Petria Thomas; Jodie Henry; Brooke Hanson; Jessicah Schipper; Alice Mills	United States; Natalie Coughlin; Amanda Beard; Jenny Thompson; Kara Lynn Joyce; Haley Cope; Tara Kirk; Rachel Komisarz; Amanda Weir	Germany; Antje Buschschulte; Sarah Poewe; Franziska van Almsick; Daniela Götz
2008 Beijing	Australia; Emily Seebohm; Leisel Jones; Jessicah Schipper; Lisbeth Trickett; Tarnee White; Felicity Galvez; Shayne Reese	United States; Natalie Coughlin; Rebecca Soni; Christine Magnuson; Dara Torres; Margaret Hoelzer; Megan Jendrick; Elaine Breeden; Kara Lynn Joyce	China; Zhao Jing; Sun Ye; Zhou Yafei; Pang Jiaying; Xu Tianlongzi
2012 London	United States; Missy Franklin; Rebecca Soni; Dana Vollmer; Allison Schmitt; Rachel Bootsma; Breeja Larson; Claire Donahue; Jessica Hardy	Australia; Emily Seebohm; Leisel Jones; Alicia Coutts; Melanie Schlanger; Brittany Elmslie	Japan; Aya Terakawa; Satomi Suzuki; Yuka Kato; Haruka Ueda
2016 Rio de Janeiro	United States; Kathleen Baker; Lilly King; Dana Vollmer; Simone Manuel; Olivia Smoliga; Katie Meili; Kelsi Worrell; Abbey Weitzeil	Australia; Emily Seebohm; Taylor McKeown; Emma McKeon; Cate Campbell; Madison Wilson; Madeline Groves; Brittany Elmslie	Denmark; Mie Nielsen; Rikke Møller Pedersen; Jeanette Ottesen; Pernille Blume
2020 Tokyo	Australia; Kaylee McKeown; Chelsea Hodges; Emma McKeon; Cate Campbell; Emily Seebohm; Brianna Throssell; Mollie O'Callaghan	United States; Regan Smith; Lydia Jacoby; Torri Huske; Abbey Weitzeil; Rhyan White; Lilly King; Claire Curzan; Erika Brown	Canada; Kylie Masse; Sydney Pickrem; Maggie Mac Neil; Penny Oleksiak; Taylor Ruck; Kayla Sanchez
2024 Paris	United States; Regan Smith; Lilly King; Gretchen Walsh; Torri Huske; Katharine Berkoff; Emma Weber; Alex Shackell; Kate Douglass	Australia; Kaylee McKeown; Jenna Strauch; Emma McKeon; Mollie O'Callaghan; Iona Anderson; Ella Ramsay; Alexandria Perkins; Meg Harris	China; Wan Letian; Tang Qianting; Zhang Yufei; Yang Junxuan; Wang Xue'er; Yu Yiting; Wu Qingfeng
2028 Los Angeles			

Note: since 1984, swimmers who swam only in preliminary rounds also received medals.

== Mixed events ==
=== 4 × 100 metre medley relay ===
Games	Gold	Silver	Bronze
2020 Tokyo	Great Britain; Kathleen Dawson; Adam Peaty; James Guy; Anna Hopkin; Freya Anderson	China; Xu Jiayu; Yan Zibei; Zhang Yufei; Yang Junxuan	Australia; Kaylee McKeown; Zac Stubblety-Cook; Matthew Temple; Emma McKeon; Bronte Campbell; Isaac Cooper; Brianna Throssell
2024 Paris	United States; Ryan Murphy; Nic Fink; Gretchen Walsh; Torri Huske; Regan Smith; Charlie Swanson; Caeleb Dressel; Abbey Weitzeil	China; Xu Jiayu; Qin Haiyang; Zhang Yufei; Yang Junxuan; Tang Qianting; Pan Zhanle	Australia; Kaylee McKeown; Joshua Yong; Matthew Temple; Mollie O'Callaghan; Iona Anderson; Zac Stubblety-Cook; Emma McKeon; Kyle Chalmers
2028 Los Angeles			

== Discontinued event ==
=== 300 metre freestyle ===
Games	Gold	Silver	Bronze
1920 Antwerp	Ethelda Bleibtrey; United States	Margaret Woodbridge; United States	Frances Schroth; United States

== All-time medal table 1912–2024 ==
Rank	Nation	Gold	Silver	Bronze	Total
1	United States	112	87	75	274
2	Australia	41	35	30	106
3	Germany	37	38	46	121
4	Netherlands	16	16	16	48
5	Hungary	13	8	6	27
6	China	12	17	16	45
7	Japan	7	4	11	22
8	Great Britain	6	12	15	33
9	Canada	6	11	17	34
10	South Africa	5	2	5	12
11	Ukraine	4	1	0	5
12	Soviet Union	3	7	8	18
13	Sweden	3	6	4	13
14	Denmark	3	3	6	12
15	Romania	3	2	3	8
16	Ireland	3	0	2	5
17	France	2	6	6	14
18	Zimbabwe	2	4	1	7
19	Italy	1	3	3	7
20	Spain	1	2	2	5
21	Poland	1	2	1	4
22	Costa Rica	1	1	2	4
23	Bulgaria	1	1	1	3
24	Australasia	1	1	0	2
24	Yugoslavia	1	1	0	2
26	Unified Team	1	0	1	2
27	Lithuania	1	0	0	1
28	Russia	0	4	1	5
29	Hong Kong	0	2	2	4
30	Belarus	0	2	1	3
31	Slovakia	0	2	0	2
32	Argentina	0	1	1	2
33	Slovenia	0	1	0	1
34	Austria	0	0	2	2
35	Belgium	0	0	1	1
35	Mexico	0	0	1	1
35	New Zealand	0	0	1	1
35	Norway	0	0	1	1
Totals (38 entries)		287	282	288	857

== See also ==
- List of Olympic medalists in swimming (men)
- List of individual gold medalists in swimming at the Olympics and World Aquatics Championships (women)
- List of gold medalist relay teams in swimming at the Olympics and World Aquatics Championships
- List of top Olympic gold medalists in swimming
- Swimming at the Summer Olympics
- List of World Aquatics Championships medalists in swimming (women)
- List of Asian Games medalists in swimming
