= United States at the 1928 Summer Olympics =

- Flag of the United States
- IOC code: USA
- NOC: United States Olympic Committee

in Amsterdam
- Competitors: 280 in 15 sports
- Flag bearer: Bud Houser
- Medals Ranked 1st: Gold 22 Silver 18 Bronze 16 Total 56

Summer Olympics appearances (overview)
- 1896; 1900; 1904; 1908; 1912; 1920; 1924; 1928; 1932; 1936; 1948; 1952; 1956; 1960; 1964; 1968; 1972; 1976; 1980; 1984; 1988; 1992; 1996; 2000; 2004; 2008; 2012; 2016; 2020; 2024

Other related appearances
- 1906 Intercalated Games

The United States competed at the 1928 Summer Olympics in Amsterdam, Netherlands. 280 competitors, 236 men and 44 women, took part in 96 events in 15 sports.

== Medalists ==
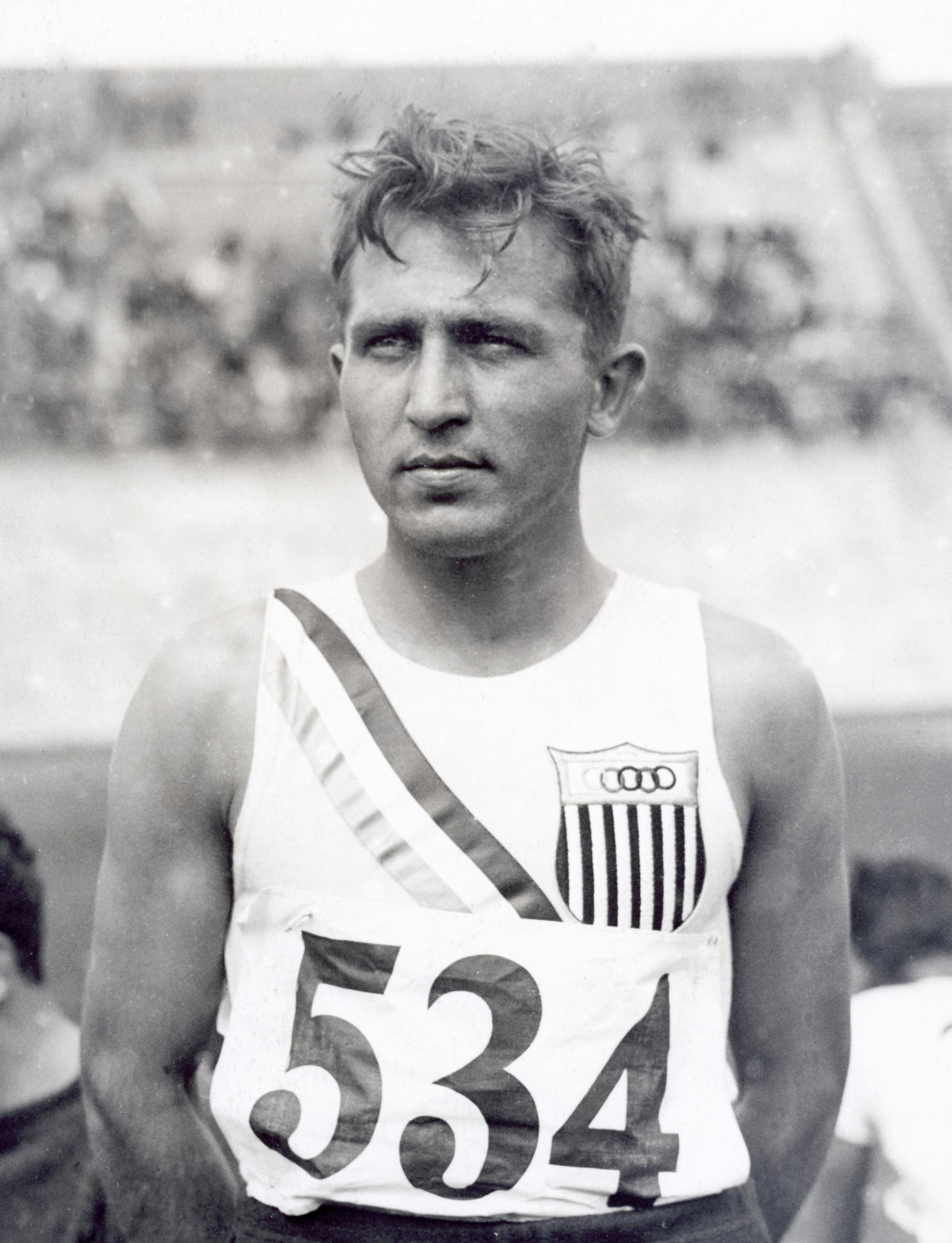
Ed Hamm

Medal	Name	Sport	Event	Date
Gold	John Kuck	Athletics	Men's shot put	July 29
Gold	Bob King	Athletics	Men's high jump	July 29
Gold	Ed Hamm	Athletics	Men's long jump	July 31
Gold	Betty Robinson	Athletics	Women's 100 m	July 31
Gold	Sabin Carr	Athletics	Men's pole vault	August 1
Gold	Bud Houser	Athletics	Men's discus throw	August 1
Gold	Allie Morrison	Wrestling	Men's freestyle featherweight	August 1
Gold	Ray Barbuti	Athletics	Men's 400 m	August 3
Gold	Charles Borah; Henry Russell; James Quinn; Frank Wykoff	Athletics	Men's 4 × 100 m relay	August 5
Gold	Fred Alderman; George Baird; Ray Barbuti; Emerson Spencer	Athletics	Men's 4 × 400 m relay	August 5
Gold	Martha Norelius	Swimming	Women's 400 m freestyle	August 6
Gold	Pete Desjardins	Diving	Men's 3 m springboard	August 8
Gold	Helen Meany	Diving	Women's 3 m springboard	August 9
Gold	George Kojac	Swimming	Men's 100 m backstroke	August 9
Gold	Eleanor Garatti; Adelaide Lambert; Martha Norelius; Albina Osipowich	Swimming	Women's 4 × 100 m freestyle relay	August 9
Gold	Paul Costello; Charles McIlvaine	Rowing	Men's double sculls	August 10
Gold	Donald Blessing; John Brinck; Hubert A. Caldwell; William Dally; Peter Donlon; Francis Frederick; Marvin Stalder; William Thompson; James Workman	Rowing	Men's eight	August 10
Gold	Pete Desjardins	Diving	Men's 10 m platform	August 11
Gold	Elizabeth Becker-Pinkston	Diving	Women's 10 m platform	August 11
Gold	Johnny Weissmuller	Swimming	Men's 100 m freestyle	August 11
Gold	Austin Clapp; George Kojac; Walter Laufer; Johnny Weissmuller	Swimming	Men's 4 × 200 m freestyle relay	August 11
Gold	Albina Osipowich	Swimming	Women's 100 m freestyle	August 11
Silver	John Daley	Boxing	Men's bantamweight	July 11
Silver	Stephen Halaiko	Boxing	Men's lightweight	July 11
Silver	Benjamin Hedges	Athletics	Men's high jump	July 29
Silver	Herman Brix	Athletics	Men's shot put	July 29
Silver	Frank Cuhel	Athletics	Men's 400 m hurdles	July 30
Silver	Lillian Copeland	Athletics	Women's discus throw	July 31
Silver	Steve Anderson	Athletics	Men's 110 m hurdles	August 1
Silver	William Droegemueller	Athletics	Men's pole vault	August 1
Silver	Lloyd Appleton	Wrestling	Men's freestyle welterweight	August 1
Silver	Levi Casey	Athletics	Men's triple jump	August 2
Silver	Jessie Cross; Loretta McNeil; Betty Robinson; Mary Washburn	Athletics	Women's 4 × 100 m relay	August 5
Silver	Michael Galitzen	Diving	Men's 3 m springboard	August 8
Silver	Dorothy Poynton	Diving	Women's 3 m springboard	August 9
Silver	Walter Laufer	Swimming	Men's 100 m backstroke	August 9
Silver	Ken Myers	Rowing	Men's single sculls	August 10
Silver	Ernest Bayer; George Healis; Charles Karle; William Miller	Rowing	Men's coxless four	August 10
Silver	Georgia Coleman	Diving	Women's 10 m platform	August 11
Silver	Eleanor Garatti	Swimming	Women's 100 m freestyle	August 11
Bronze	Harold Devine	Boxing	Men's featherweight	July 11
Bronze	Morgan Taylor	Athletics	Men's 400 m hurdles	July 30
Bronze	Edmund Black	Athletics	Men's hammer throw	July 30
Bronze	Al Bates	Athletics	Men's long jump	July 31
Bronze	John Collier	Athletics	Men's 110 m hurdles	August 1
Bronze	Charles McGinnis	Athletics	Men's pole vault	August 1
Bronze	James Corson	Athletics	Men's discus throw	August 1
Bronze	Ken Doherty	Athletics	Men's decathlon	August 5
Bronze	Mildred Wiley	Athletics	Women's high jump	August 5
Bronze	Buster Crabbe	Swimming	Men's 1500 m freestyle	August 6
Bronze	Josephine McKim	Swimming	Women's 400 m freestyle	August 6
Bronze	George Calnan	Fencing	Men's épée	August 7
Bronze	Georgia Coleman	Diving	Women's 3 m springboard	August 9
Bronze	Paul Wyatt	Swimming	Men's 100 m backstroke	August 9
Bronze	Paul McDowell; John Schmitt	Rowing	Men's coxless pair	August 10
Bronze	Michael Galitzen	Diving	Men's 10 m platform	August 11

== Athletics ==
Key

- Note–Ranks given for track events are within the athlete's heat only
- Q = Qualified for the next round
- q = Qualified for the next round as a fastest loser or, in field events, by position without achieving the qualifying target
- N/A = Round not applicable for the event
- Bye = Athlete not required to compete in round

Women
Track & road events

Athlete	Event	Heat		Semifinal		Final	
Athlete	Event	Result	Rank	Result	Rank	Result	Rank
Elta Cartwright	100 m	Unknown	2 Q	Unknown	4	Did not advance	
Betty Robinson	100 m	Unknown	2 Q	12.4 OR	1 Q	12.2 WR	1st place, gold medalist(s)
Anne Vrana-O'Brien	100 m	13.1	3	Did not advance			
Mary Washburn	100 m	12.8	2 Q	Unknown	4	Did not advance	
Dee Boeckmann	800 m	Unknown	—N/a		6	Did not advance	
Florence MacDonald	800 m	Unknown	—N/a		2 Q	2:22.6	6
Rayma Wilson	800 m	Unknown	—N/a		10	Did not advance	
Jessie Cross; Loretta McNeil; Betty Robinson; Mary Washburn	4 × 100 m	49.8	—N/a		1 Q	48.8	2nd place, silver medalist(s)

Field events

Athlete	Event	Qualification		Final	
Athlete	Event	Distance	Position	Distance	Position
Mildred Wiley	High jump	1.40	-	1.56	3rd place, bronze medalist(s)
Jean Shiley	High jump	1.40	-	1.51	4
Catherine Maguire	High jump	1.40	-	1.48	8
Marion Holley	High jump	1.40	-	1.48	9
Lillian Copeland	Discus throw	36.66	2 Q	37.08	2nd place, silver medalist(s)
Maybelle Reichardt	Discus throw	33.52	7	Did not advance	
Rena MacDonald	Discus throw	30.25	15	Did not advance	
Margaret Jenkins	Discus throw	27.07	19	Did not advance	

== Boxing ==
=== Men's Flyweight (– 50.8 kg) ===
- Hyman Miller

- First Round — Lost to Robert Sartos (BEL), points

=== Men's Heavyweight (+ 79.4 kg) ===
- Alexander Kaletchetz

- First Round — Bye
- Quarterfinals — Lost to Sverre Sørsdal (NOR), KO-1

== Cycling ==
Four cyclists, all men, represented the United States in 1928.

Individual road race

- Chester Nelsen, Sr.
- Henry O'Brien, Jr.
- Peter Smessaert
- Charles Westerholm

Team road race

- Chester Nelsen, Sr.
- Henry O'Brien, Jr.
- Peter Smessaert

== Fencing ==
16 fencers, 14 men and 2 women, represented the United States in 1928.

Men's foil

- Joe Levis
- George Calnan
- Dernell Every

Men's team foil

- George Calnan, René Peroy, Joe Levis, Harold Rayner, Henry Breckinridge, Dernell Every

Men's épée

- George Calnan
- Allen Milner
- Edward Barnett

Men's team épée

- Arthur Lyon, George Calnan, Allen Milner, Harold Rayner, Henry Breckinridge, Edward Barnett

Men's sabre

- John Huffman
- Norman Cohn-Armitage
- Nickolas Muray

Men's team sabre

- Ervin Acel, Norman Cohn-Armitage, John Huffman, Arthur Lyon, Nickolas Muray, Harold Van Buskirk

Women's foil

- Marion Lloyd
- Irma Hopper

== Football ==
Results

United States 2–11 Argentina

Roster

- Albert Cooper
- John Duffy
- Harry Smith
- Francis Ryan
- Jack Lyons
- Robert Aitken
- William Findlay
- Jack Deal
- Rudy Kuntner
- Henry Carroll
- Jimmy Gallagher

Coach: George Burford

== Modern pentathlon ==
Three pentathletes represented the United States in 1928.

- Aubrey Newman
- Richard Mayo
- Peter Hains

== Swimming ==
Men

Athlete	Event	Heat		Semifinal		Final	
Athlete	Event	Time	Rank	Time	Rank	Time	Rank
George Kojac	100 m freestyle	1:01.6		1:01.0		1:00.8	4
Walter Laufer	100 m freestyle	1:00.8		1:00.6		1:01.0	5
Johnny Weissmuller	100 m freestyle	1:00.0		58.6 OR		58.6 =OR	1st place, gold medalist(s)
Austin Clapp	400 m freestyle	5:13.4		5:06.8		5:16.0	5
Buster Crabbe	400 m freestyle	5:09.8		5:06.2		5:05.4	4
Ray Ruddy	400 m freestyle	5:26.4		5:20.6		5:25.0	6
Austin Clapp	1500 m freestyle	21:31.0		DNS		Did not advance	
Buster Crabbe	1500 m freestyle	20:17.8		20:55.4		20:28.8	3rd place, bronze medalist(s)
Ray Ruddy	1500 m freestyle	22:12.0		21:31.2		21:05.0	4
George Kojac	100 m backstroke	1:09.2 OR		1:10.0		1:08.2 WR	1st place, gold medalist(s)
Walter Laufer	100 m backstroke	1:12.8		1:12.6		1:10.0	2nd place, silver medalist(s)
Paul Wyatt	100 m backstroke	1:14.0		1:14.2		1:12.0	3rd place, bronze medalist(s)
Thomas Blankenburg	200 m breaststroke	3:04.2		Unknown		Did not advance	
Austin Clapp; Walter Laufer; George Kojac; Johnny Weissmuller; Paul Samson; David Young	4 × 200 m freestyle relay	—N/a		9:38.8 WR		9:36.2 WR	1st place, gold medalist(s)

Women

Athlete	Event	Heat		Semifinal		Final	
Athlete	Event	Time	Rank	Time	Rank	Time	Rank
Eleanor Garatti	100 m freestyle	1:14.8		1:11.4 OR		1:11.4	2nd place, silver medalist(s)
Susan Laird	100 m freestyle	1:14.2		1:13.8		1:14.6	5
Albina Osipowich	100 m freestyle	1:12.4		1:12.2 =OR		1:11.0	1st place, gold medalist(s)
Ethel McGary	400 m freestyle	6:04.6		Unknown		Did not advance	
Josephine McKim	400 m freestyle	6:10.0		5:55.0		6:00.2	3rd place, bronze medalist(s)
Martha Norelius	400 m freestyle	5:45.4 WR	1 Q	5:58.0		5:42.8 WR	1st place, gold medalist(s)
Marian Gilman	100 m backstroke	1:24.0		—N/a		1:24.2	4
Eleanor Holm	100 m backstroke	1:23.6		—N/a		1:24.4	=5
Lisa Lindstrom	100 m backstroke	1:23.0		—N/a		1:24.4	=5
Jane Fauntz	200 m breaststroke	3:29.0		Unknown		Did not advance	
Agnes Geraghty	200 m breaststroke	3:18.8		Unknown		Did not advance	
Margaret Hoffman	200 m breaststroke	3:21.6		3:22.4		3:19.2	5
Adelaide Lambert; Albina Osipowich; Eleanor Garatti; Martha Norelius; Josephine McKim; Susan Laird	4 × 100 m freestyle relay	—N/a		4:55.6 WR	1 Q	4:47.6 WR	1st place, gold medalist(s)
