= Swimming at the 1928 Summer Olympics – Women's 4 × 100 metre freestyle relay =

Women's 4 × 100 metre freestyle relay at the Games of the IX Olympiad
- Venue: Olympic Sports Park Swim Stadium
- Date: 9 August 1928
- Competitors: 31 from 7 nations
- Teams: 7
- Winning time: 4:47.6 WR

Medalists
1st place, gold medalist(s)		Adelaide Lambert, Albina Osipowich, Eleanor Garatti, Martha Norelius, Josephine McKim*, Susan Laird*	United States
2nd place, silver medalist(s)		Joyce Cooper, Cissie Stewart, Vera Tanner, Ellen King	Great Britain
3rd place, bronze medalist(s)		Kathleen Russell, Rhoda Rennie, Mary Bedford, Freddie van der Goes *Swimmer who participated in the heats only. Under 1928 Olympic rules, they did not receive a medal.	South Africa

The women's 4 × 100 metre freestyle relay was a swimming event held as part of the swimming at the 1928 Summer Olympics programme. It was the fourth appearance of the event, which was established in 1912. The competition was held on Thursday 9 August 1928.

The United States replaced two swimmers between the semi-finals and the final, while France replaced one. Thirty-one swimmers from seven nations competed.

Note: The International Olympic Committee medal database shows only these four swimmers from the United States as gold medalist. Susan Laird and Josephine McKim both swam in the semi-final are not credited with medals.

== Records ==
These were the standing world and Olympic records (in minutes) prior to the 1928 Summer Olympics.

World record	4:58.8	(United States) Euphrasia Donnelly (United States) Gertrude Ederle (United States) Ethel Lackie (United States) Mariechen Wehselau	Paris (FRA)	18 July 1924
Olympic record	4:58.8	(United States) Euphrasia Donnelly (United States) Gertrude Ederle (United States) Ethel Lackie (United States) Mariechen Wehselau	Paris (FRA)	18 July 1924

The United States with Adelaide Lambert, Josephine McKim, Susan Laird, and Albina Osipowich set a new world record in the semi-final with 4:55.6 minutes. In the final the United States with Adelaide Lambert, Albina Osipowich, Eleanor Garatti, and Martha Norelius bettered the world record to 4:47.6 minutes.

== Results ==
=== Semifinals ===
==== Semifinal 1 ====
Rank	Nation	Swimmers	Time	Notes
1	United States	Adelaide Lambert; Josephine McKim; Susan Laird; Albina Osipowich	4:55.6	Q, WR
2	Netherlands	Eva Smits; Truus Baumeister; Maria Vierdag; Marie Braun	5:08.8	Q
3	South Africa	Rhoda Rennie; Freddie van der Goes; Mary Bedford; Kathleen Russell	5:17.4	Q
4	Denmark	Lilian Staugaard; Rigmor Olsen; Gerda Bredgaard; Agnete Olsen	Unknown	

==== Semifinal 2 ====
Rank	Nation	Swimmers	Time	Notes
1	Great Britain	Joyce Cooper; Iris Tanner; Cissie Stewart; Ellen King	5:16.6	Q
2	Germany	Charlotte Lehmann; Reni Erkens; Herta Wunder; Irmintraut Schneider	5:19.0	Q
3	France	Bienna Pélégry; Georgina Roty; Marguerite Ledoux; Claire Horrent	5:42.4	Q

=== Final ===
Rank	Nation	Swimmers	Time	Notes
1st place, gold medalist(s)	United States	Adelaide Lambert; Albina Osipowich; Eleanor Garatti; Martha Norelius	4:47.6	WR
2nd place, silver medalist(s)	Great Britain	Joyce Cooper; Cissie Stewart; Iris Tanner; Ellen King	5:02.8	
3rd place, bronze medalist(s)	South Africa	Kathleen Russell; Rhoda Rennie; Mary Bedford; Freddie van der Goes	5:13.4	
4	Germany	Charlotte Lehmann; Herta Wunder; Irmintraut Schneider; Reni Erkens	5:14.4	
5	France	Bienna Pélégry; Anne Dupire; Marguerite Ledoux; Claire Horrent	5:32.0	
—	Netherlands	Eva Smits; Truus Baumeister; Maria Vierdag; Marie Braun	DQ	
