= Swimming at the 1928 Summer Olympics – Women's 100 metre freestyle =

Women's 100 metre freestyle at the Games of the IX Olympiad
- Date: 10–11 August
- Competitors: 24 from 11 nations

Medalists
1st place, gold medalist(s)		Albina Osipowich	United States
2nd place, silver medalist(s)		Eleanor Garatti	United States
3rd place, bronze medalist(s)		Joyce Cooper	Great Britain

The women's 100 metre freestyle was a swimming event held as part of the swimming at the 1928 Summer Olympics programme. It was the fourth appearance of the event, which was established in 1912. The competition was held on Friday and Saturday, 10 and 11 August 1928.

Twenty-four swimmers from eleven nations competed.

== Records ==
These were the standing world and Olympic records (in seconds) prior to the 1928 Summer Olympics.

World record	1:10.0	(United States) Ethel Lackie	Toledo (USA)	28 January 1926
Olympic record	1:12.2	(United States) Mariechen Wehselau	Paris (FRA)	19 July 1924

In the first semi-final Albina Osipowich equaled the Olympic record with 1 minute 12.2 seconds. In the second semi-final Eleanor Garatti improved the record with a time of 1 minute 11.4 seconds. In the final Albina Osipowich again bettered the Olympic record with 1 minute 11.0 seconds.

== Results ==
=== Heats ===
The fastest two in each heat and the fastest third-placed from across the heats advanced.

==== Heat 1 ====
Rank	Swimmer	Nation	Time	Notes
1	Jean McDowell	Great Britain	1:14.0	Q
2	Susan Laird	United States	1:14.2	Q
3	Maria Vierdag	Netherlands	1:14.4	q
4	Reni Erkens	Germany	1:15.0	
5	Rhoda Rennie	South Africa	Unknown	
6	Claire Horrent	France	Unknown	

==== Heat 2 ====
Rank	Swimmer	Nation	Time	Notes
1	Agnete Olsen	Denmark	1:15.8	Q
2	Ena Stockley	New Zealand	1:16.4	Q
3	Zus Engelenberg	South Africa	1:22.6	
4	Edna Davey	Australia	Unknown	
5	Marguerite Ledoux	France	Unknown	

==== Heat 3 ====
Rank	Swimmer	Nation	Time	Notes
1	Eleanor Garatti	United States	1:14.8	Q
2	Iris Tanner	Great Britain	1:26.4	Q

==== Heat 4 ====
Rank	Swimmer	Nation	Time	Notes
1	Albina Osipowich	United States	1:12.4	Q
2	Kathleen Miller	New Zealand	1:17.2	Q
3	Margit Sipos	Hungary	1:18.8	

==== Heat 5 ====
Rank	Swimmer	Nation	Time	Notes
1	Kathleen Russell	South Africa	1:15.4	Q
2	Sarolta Stieber	Hungary	1:22.2	Q
3	Marguerite Dockrell	Ireland	1:31.6	

==== Heat 6 ====
Rank	Swimmer	Nation	Time	Notes
1	Charlotte Lehmann	Germany	1:15.6	Q
2	Joyce Cooper	Great Britain	1:16.8	Q
3	Bonnie Mealing	Australia	1:20.6	
4	Gerda Bredgaard	Denmark	Unknown	
5	Anne Dupire	France	Unknown	

=== Semifinals ===
The fastest three in each semi-final advanced.

==== Semifinal 1 ====
Rank	Swimmer	Nation	Time	Notes
1	Albina Osipowich	United States	1:12.2	Q, =OR
2	Susan Laird	United States	1:13.8	Q
3	Joyce Cooper	Great Britain	1:14.0	Q
4	Iris Tanner	Great Britain	1:04.8	
5	Ena Stockley	New Zealand	Unknown	
6	Agnete Olsen	Denmark	Unknown	
—	Sarolta Stieber	Hungary	DNF	

==== Semifinal 2 ====
Rank	Swimmer	Nation	Time	Notes
1	Eleanor Garatti	United States	1:11.4	Q, OR
2	Jean McDowell	Great Britain	1:15.6	Q
3	Charlotte Lehmann	Germany	1:15.8	Q
4	Kathleen Russell	South Africa	Unknown	
5	Maria Vierdag	Netherlands	Unknown	
6	Kathleen Miller	New Zealand	Unknown	

=== Final ===
Saturday 11 August 1928:

Rank	Swimmer	Nation	Time	Notes
1st place, gold medalist(s)	Albina Osipowich	United States	1:11.0	OR
2nd place, silver medalist(s)	Eleanor Garatti	United States	1:11.4	
3rd place, bronze medalist(s)	Joyce Cooper	Great Britain	1:13.6	
4	Jean McDowell	Great Britain	1:13.8	
5	Susan Laird	United States	1:14.6	
6	Charlotte Lehmann	Germany	1:15.2	
