= South Africa at the 1928 Summer Olympics =

- IOC code: RSA (ZAF used at these Games)
- NOC: South African Olympic and Empire Games Association

in Amsterdam
- Competitors: 24 (18 men, 6 women) in 7 sports
- Medals Ranked 23rd: Gold 1 Silver 0 Bronze 2 Total 3

Summer Olympics appearances (overview)
- 1904; 1908; 1912; 1920; 1924; 1928; 1932; 1936; 1948; 1952; 1956; 1960; 1964–1988; 1992; 1996; 2000; 2004; 2008; 2012; 2016; 2020; 2024

The Union of South Africa competed at the 1928 Summer Olympics in Amsterdam, Netherlands. 24 competitors, 18 men and 6 women, took part in 25 events in 7 sports.

== Medalists ==
Medal	Name	Sport	Event	Date
Gold	Sydney Atkinson	Athletics	Men's 110 m hurdles	August 1
Bronze	Harry Isaacs	Boxing	Men's bantamweight	August 11
Bronze	Mary Bedford, Rhoda Rennie, Kathleen Russell, Freddie van der Goes	Swimming	Women's 4 × 100 m freestyle relay	August 9

== Boxing ==
Men's Flyweight (– 50.8 kg)

- Baddie Lebanon

- First round — Bye
- Second round — Defeated Olav Nielsen (NOR), points
- Quarterfinals — Defeated Ben Bril (HOL), points
- Semifinals — Lost to Armand Apell (FRA), points
- Third Place Match — Lost to Carlo Covagnioli (ITA), points

== Cycling ==
One male cyclist represented South Africa in 1928.

Individual road race

- Fred Short

== Swimming ==
Women

Athlete	Event	Heat		Semifinal		Final	
Athlete	Event	Time	Rank	Time	Rank	Time	Rank
Zus Engelenberg	100 m freestyle	1:22.6		Did not advance			
Rhoda Rennie	100 m freestyle	Unknown		Did not advance			
Kathleen Russell	100 m freestyle	1:15.4		Unknown		Did not advance	
Mary Bedford	400 m freestyle	Unknown		Did not advance			
Rhoda Rennie	400 m freestyle	Unknown		Did not advance			
Freddie van der Goes	400 m freestyle	6:03.6		6:01.6		6:07.2	5
Rhoda Rennie; Freddie van der Goes; Mary Bedford; Kathleen Russell	4 × 100 m freestyle relay	—N/a		5:17.4		5:13.4	3rd place, bronze medalist(s)
