= Swimming at the 1928 Summer Olympics =

Coordinates: 52.3475°N 4.8561°E

Swimming at the Games of the IX Olympiad
- Venue: Olympic Sports Park Swim Stadium
- Dates: 4–11 August 1928
- No. of events: 11
- Competitors: 182 from 28 nations

At the 1928 Summer Olympics in Amsterdam, eleven swimming events were contested, six for men and five for women. The competitions were held from Saturday August 4, 1928, to Saturday August 11, 1928.

There were 182 participants from 28 countries competing.

== Medal table ==
Rank	Nation	Gold	Silver	Bronze	Total
1	United States	6	2	3	11
2	Netherlands	1	2	0	3
3	Germany	1	1	1	3
3	Japan	1	1	1	3
5	Sweden	1	0	1	2
6	Argentina	1	0	0	1
7	Great Britain	0	2	2	4
8	Australia	0	2	0	2
9	Hungary	0	1	0	1
10	Canada	0	0	1	1
10	Philippines	0	0	1	1
10	South Africa	0	0	1	1
Totals (12 entries)		11	11	11	33

== Medal summary ==
=== Men's events ===
Games	Gold	Silver	Bronze
100 m freestyle	Johnny Weissmuller; United States	István Bárány; Hungary	Katsuo Takaishi; Japan
400 m freestyle	Alberto Zorrilla; Argentina	Boy Charlton; Australia	Arne Borg; Sweden
1500 m freestyle	Arne Borg; Sweden	Boy Charlton; Australia	Buster Crabbe; United States
100 m backstroke	George Kojac; United States	Walter Laufer; United States	Paul Wyatt; United States
200 m breaststroke	Yoshiyuki Tsuruta; Japan	Erich Rademacher; Germany	Teófilo Yldefonso; Philippines
4 × 200 m freestyle relay	United States; Austin Clapp; George Kojac; Walter Laufer; Johnny Weissmuller	Japan; Nobuo Arai; Tokuhei Sada; Katsuo Takaishi; Hiroshi Yoneyama	Canada; Garnet Ault; Munroe Bourne; Walter Spence; James Thompson

=== Women's events ===
Games	Gold	Silver	Bronze
100 m freestyle	Albina Osipowich; United States	Eleanor Garatti; United States	Joyce Cooper; Great Britain
400 m freestyle	Martha Norelius; United States	Marie Braun; Netherlands	Josephine McKim; United States
100 m backstroke	Marie Braun; Netherlands	Ellen King; Great Britain	Joyce Cooper; Great Britain
200 m breaststroke	Hilde Schrader; Germany	Marie Baron; Netherlands	Charlotte Mühe; Germany
4 × 100 m freestyle relay	United States; Eleanor Garatti; Adelaide Lambert; Martha Norelius; Albina Osipowich	Great Britain; Joyce Cooper; Ellen King; Cissie Stewart; Iris Tanner	South Africa; Mary Bedford; Freddie van der Goes; Rhoda Rennie; Kathleen Russell

== Participating nations ==
182 swimmers from 28 nations competed. Chile, Ireland, Panama, the Philippines, and Poland competed in swimming for the first time.

- Argentina (4)
- Australia (5)
- Austria (3)
- Belgium (5)
- Canada (6)
- Chile (4)
- Czechoslovakia (1)
- Denmark (5)
- Finland (1)
- France (13)

- Germany (19)
- Great Britain (21)
- Hungary (8)
- Ireland (2)
- Italy (5)
- Japan (10)
- Luxembourg (3)
- Netherlands (14)
- New Zealand (4)
- Norway (1)

- Panama (1)
- Philippines (2)
- Poland (2)
- South Africa (5)
- Spain (5)
- Sweden (9)
- Switzerland (1)
- United States (23)
