= Truus Baumeister =

Dutch swimmer (1907–2000)

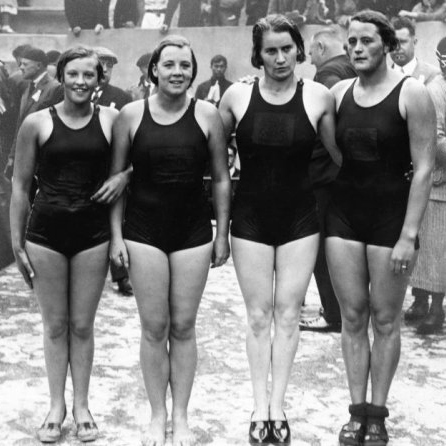
- Dutch 4×100 m team at the 1931 European Championships, with Willy den Ouden, Marie Braun, Truus Baumeister, and Maria Vierdag.

Personal information
- Born: 21 October 1907 Rotterdam, the Netherlands
- Died: 25 December 2000 (aged 93) Brooklyn, New York

Sport
- Sport: Swimming
- Club: ODZ, Rotterdam
Medal record
Representing the Netherlands
European Championships
Gold medal – first place	1931 Paris	4×100 m freestyle

Geertruida Christina "Truus" Baumeister (21 October 1907 – 25 December 2000) was a Dutch freestyle swimmer who won a gold medal in the 4 × 100 m relay at the 1931 European championships.

== Swimming career ==
In 1928, Baumeister competed in the 400 m and 4 × 100 m events at the 1928 Summer Olympics. She was eliminated at 3rd place in the first heat of the 400 m freestyle. The Dutch team of Eva Smits, Maria Vierdag, Marie Braun and Baumeister came in a close third, but were disqualified because Baumeister had jumped too early in the water at her changeover. Baumeister made amends in 1931 when she and her team won gold in the 4 × 100 m relay at the 1931 European championships, beating the closest competitors, Great Britain, by six seconds.

== Biography ==
She was born in Rotterdam as the daughter of Arnold Carl Theodor Baumeister and Geertruda Elisabeth Dielissen. In 1936-37 she worked as swimming pool attendant on the cruise ship Statendam and in October 1938 she married Johannes Hoftijzer, who was an engineer on the same ship. She emigrated with the name "Gertrude Hoftyzer" to the United States in December 1946, where she joined her husband who had taken residence on 78th Street in Brooklyn, New York, in May of that year. Hoftijzer died aged 69 in April 1968 in Rock Hill, New York, while Baumeister herself lived to the age of 93, and died on 25 December 2000, in Brooklyn.
