= Ena Stockley =

New Zealander swimmer

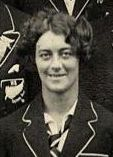
- Stockley in 1928

Personal information
- Born: 4 July 1906 New Plymouth, New Zealand
- Died: 21 May 1989 (aged 82) Takapuna, New Zealand

Sport
- Sport: Swimming

Ena Phyllis Stockley (4 July 1906 – 21 May 1989) was a New Zealand swimmer. She competed in two events at the 1928 Summer Olympics.

Stockley was 22 years old when she competed in the 1928 Summer Olympics, she entered the 100 metre freestyle and finished second in her heat, but finished fifth in her semi-final so didn't advance to the final, she fared better in the 100 metre backstroke finishing third in her heat, making her fastest loser, so qualified for the final, where she finished in seventh place.

Stockley was the National 100 yard freestyle Champion from 1925 to 1929 and held the National record time in 1929, she held the 100 yard backstroke record for two years breaking it four times herself between 1927 and 1929.
