= Albina Osipowich =

American swimmer (1911–1964)

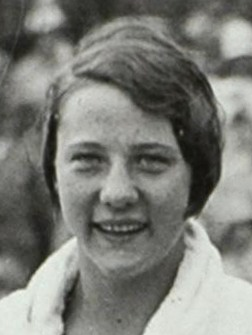
- Osipowich at the 1928 Olympics

Personal information
- Full name: Albina Lucy Charlotte Osipowich
- National team: United States
- Born: February 26, 1911 Worcester, Massachusetts, U.S.
- Died: June 6, 1964 (aged 53) Lynchburg, Virginia, U.S.
- Spouses: Harrison Von Aken, Jr.

Sport
- Sport: Swimming
- Strokes: Freestyle
- Club: Boys' Club Auxiliary
- College team: Pembroke College; Providence, RI
Medal record
Women's swimming
Representing the United States
Olympic Games
Gold medal – first place	1928 Amsterdam	100 m freestyle
Gold medal – first place	1928 Amsterdam	4×100 m freestyle relay

Albina Lucy Charlotte Osipowich (February 26, 1911 – June 6, 1964), later known by her married name Albina Van Aken, was an American competition swimmer for Pembroke Women's College, now Brown University, a 1928 Olympic champion, and a 1929 world record holder in the 100-meter freestyle. Osipowich won gold medals in the women's 100-meter freestyle and 4×100-meter freestyle relay at the 1928 Summer Olympics in Amsterdam, setting world records in both events. Though training less intensely in her Sophomore year at Pembroke, she helped lead the women's team to an undefeated regular season, and captained the team in her Junior Year. Removing herself from international competition, she declined to swim in national meets after her Freshman year at Pembroke, though continued to swim in regional meets.

== Early life and swimming ==
Albina Osipowich was born a daughter of immigrants on February 26, 1911 to Mr. Charles W. and Mrs. Veronica Osipowich, at 8 Columbia Street in Worcester, Massachusetts. In her youth, she began swimming against the boys at the Worcester Boy's Club, and it was soon discovered she was faster than most in the sprint distances. While spending summers in her youth at Cape Cod, she first took a seasonal interest in swimming and competing.

In early competition, she swam in the 1926 New England championships, winning the New England Senior title at Norumbega Park on August 14, 1926 in the 880-yard event, and set a new record winning the 220-yard event the following month. In March, 1926, she captured the junior 100-yard freestyle title, one of her signature events. In late 1926, she won regional titles in the 50, 220, and 500-yard distances in indoor championships, setting records in the 220 and 500. She attended Worcester North High School, graduating in 1929. With her exceptional times, by the age of 17 she was selected to compete in the trials for the 1928 U.S. Women's Olympic team.

In July, 1927, she placed first in the New England AAU one-mile swimming championship in a time of 29.25.2 seconds at the City of Boston Swimming Meet, followed by Delna Carlstrom, and frequent rival Joan McSheehy.

== 1928 Amsterdam Olympics ==
She officially qualified for the Olympic team at Rockaway Beach, Queens, New York on July 2, 1928. She had acquired a particularly bad case of the flu at the end of 1927, which may have accounted for her third place finish in the 100 free in the Olympic trials, though Eleanor Garatti's record 1:10.6 first place finish was a difficult pace to match, though it was not official. She sailed to Amsterdam on the S.S. President Roosevelt in July. Lacking a pool onboard, the team practiced in a canvas tank, swimming with a rope attached. The women's 4x100-meter Olympic relay team that year consisted of Adelaide Lambert, Osipowich, Eleanor Garatti, and Martha Norelius with Josephine McKim and Susan Laird as alternates.

At the 1928 Summer Olympics in Amsterdam, Osipowich won a gold medal in the women's 100-meter freestyle in the world record time of 1:11, touching only .4 seconds before the American favorite Eleanor Garatti who swam a 1:11.4. Garatti had outperformed Albina in the trials. Osipowich also won a gold medal with the American women's 4×100-meter freestyle relay team that swam a combined time of 4:47.6, another world record. In 1928, the U.S. Women's Olympic team was managed by Yale Coach Bob Kiphuth.

In recognition of her Olympic victories, she was presented her gold medal by Holland's Queen Wilhelmina. A reception of 100,000 awaited her in Worcester along with boxer Harry Devine.

In 1928, she held long course American records in the 200, 220, and 100-yard freestyle. She was the recipient of two National American Athletic Union titles in the 100 and 220 freestyle in 1928. Though highly recognized for a short period, her elite swimming career did not extend long after her 17th birthday, though she swam competitively at Pembroke, and continued to enter regional meets.

She officially broke the 100-meter freestyle record with a time of 109.40 in San Francisco, California on August 25, 1929.

Competing in 1929, she placed second in the 100 and 220-yard races at the AAU National Indoor Championship in Chicago, placing second to Martha Norelius of New York. Osipowich was awarded first place honors when Norelius turned professional.

== Pembroke College (Brown University) ==
As a result of her achievement in the 1928 Olympics, the town fathers of Worcester offered her a college scholarship to the University of her choice, and she chose Pembroke, now Brown University. Starting Pembroke in the Fall of 1929 after receiving a $4000 scholarship, she was not eligible to swim on the Men's varsity team and sent a letter to the Brown Men's swimming Coach Barry requesting to swim and train with Brown's top male sprinters including Ray Hall. As Osipowich could only train one or two days a week with Pembroke's women's team, she requested to train with the men's team to retain her elite training and conditioning. Several newspapers reported in December 1929 after her first college semester, she was retiring from competitive swimming, but this applied only to national competition, as she did plan at the time to defend her New England titles in more regional meets. She did not swim extensively in the first semester of her Freshman year. By the end of her Freshman year, she had decided not to defend her national 100 and 220-yard national championships at the National Outdoor Championships at Long Beach in 1930.

In her Freshman year, she swam with the Pembroke Women's team in the 1929-30 season defeating Radcliffe and Wheaton, winning the 60-yard dash in 36.1, and taking second in the 40-yard breaststroke by finishing only inches behind the winner who swam a 35.4. As a Sophomore in March, 1931, at the end of the 1930-31 season, where Pembroke went undefeated in regular season meets, she swam the 60-yard sprint for Pembroke in 40 seconds in a home meet defeating the Radcliffe Women's team, also swimming on winning relay teams. In her Junior year, she captained the Pembroke Women's swimming team in its successful 1931-32 season. She planned to swim into the 1932-1933 season, but was unable as a result of a ruptured appendix. By the 1932-3 season, the Pembroke women had recruited Jean Sheehy, and Lisa Lindstrom, a 1928 U.S. Women's Olympic participant in the backstroke. Both had swum for the Women's Swimming Association (WSA) of New York founded by Charlotte Epstein. In 1933, Osipowich graduated from Pembroke College (Brown University) in Providence, Rhode Island, where she played field hockey and continued swimming.

== Regional meets during college ==
Continuing to compete in regional competition, she represented the Worcester Women's Swimming Association on March 6, 1930, at the Brookline Swimming Meet in greater Boston, where she swam the 50-yard sprint event in 29 seconds, bettering her former time. She also was on the winning 150-yard medley relay where she swam anchor. In April, 1930, she comfortably won the 220-yard competition in 2:50.8 at a swimming meet in Pittsfield, Massachusetts, though Joan McSheehy took greater honors, setting records in three events.

Albina's brother John Osipowich was a varsity swimmer for Worcester Tech, and won the preliminary heat of the 440-yard event in a record time of 5:43 at the 1930 Intercollegiate Championships at the Bowdoin Pool.

== Later life ==
Around October 17, 1936, she married 1936 Brown graduate Harrison Van Aken Jr. in Chicago. Van Aken had played basketball two years for Brown University, where the couple met. Van Aken worked for Chicago's Continental Bank and Trust Company. At the time of her wedding, Osipowich was working as a Director for Rhode Island's activities for women for the National Youth Administration. She worked briefly as a buyer for a department store before her marriage in 1936. The couple had two sons and travelled extensively with her family in the U.S. from New York to Virginia and also enjoyed Arizona. They lived for many years in DeWitt, N.Y. East of nearby Syracuse, then in Lynchburg, Va.

She died at her home in Lynchburg, Virginia on June 6, 1964, after moving there from DeWitt, New York in 1959. She was survived by a son and two brothers. Her husband, Harrison Van Aken Jr., had worked for General Electric in Lynchburg but had been transferred to Phoenix, Arizona in February 1963, following a divorce. She had previously been in traffic accidents while living in Syracuse in 1952 and Lynchburg in 1962. A funeral was held on June 6, 1964 at the Community Church in DeWitt, New York, and she was buried in the Church cemetery, known as the DeWitt Cemetery, part of North Orville Cemetery.

== Honors ==
Osipowich was inducted into the International Swimming Hall of Fame as a Pioneer swimmer.

The Brown Athletic Hall of Fame includes Albina Osipowich Van Aken '33, who was inducted in 1984.

== See also ==
- List of members of the International Swimming Hall of Fame
- List of Brown University people
- List of Olympic medalists in swimming (women)
- World record progression 100 metres freestyle
- World record progression 4 × 100 metres freestyle relay

Records
Preceded by Eleanor Garatti	Women's 100-meter freestyle world record-holder (long course); August 25, 1929 – March 14, 1930	Succeeded by Helene Madison
