= Sarolta Stieber =

Hungarian swimmer

Personal information
- Born: 23 May 1905 Wygoda, Poland
- Died: January 30, 1985 Enschede, Netherlands

Sport
- Sport: Swimming

Sarolta Stieber (23 May 1905 – 30 January 1985) was a Hungarian swimmer. She competed in the women's 100 metre freestyle event at the 1928 Summer Olympics.
