= Reni Erkens =

German swimmer (1909–1987)

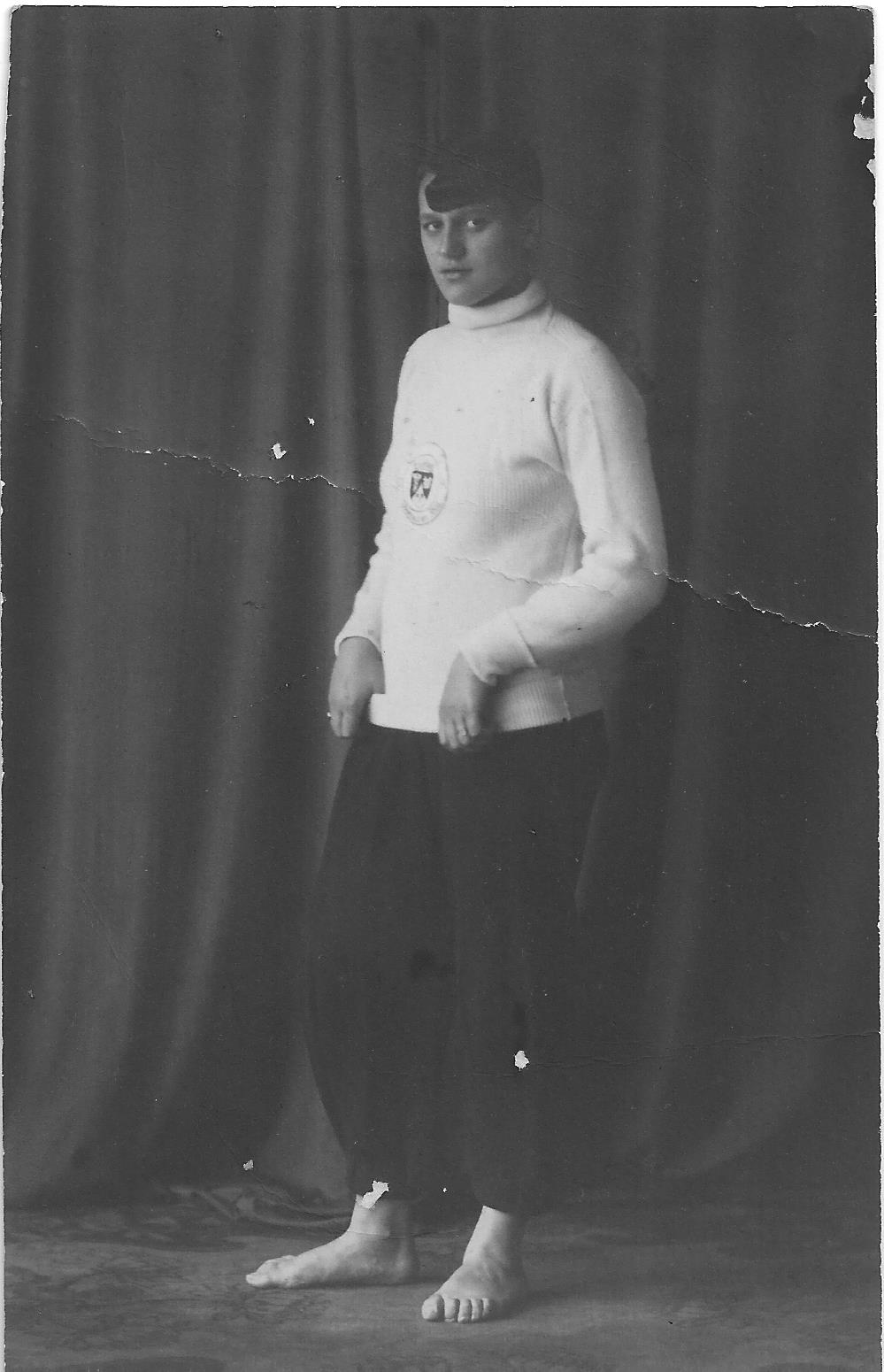

Personal information
- Born: 24 June 1909 Oberhausen, German Empire
- Died: 22 October 1987 (aged 78)

Sport
- Sport: Swimming
Medal record
Representing Germany
European Championships
Bronze medal – third place	1927 Bologna	4×100 m freestyle

Renate "Reni" Erkens (later Küppers, 24 June 1909 – 22 October 1987) was a German freestyle swimmer who competed in the 1928 Summer Olympics.

She was born in Oberhausen and was the wife of Ernst Küppers and the mother of Ernst-Joachim Küppers.

In 1928, she finished fourth with the German relay team in the 4×100 metre freestyle relay competition.

She also participated in the 100 metre freestyle event and in the 400 metre freestyle event but in both she was eliminated in the first round.
