= Herta Wunder =

German swimmer

Personal information
- Born: March 4, 1913 Leipzig, German Empire
- Died: January 28, 1992 (aged 78)

Sport
- Sport: Swimming

Herta Wunder (March 4, 1913 – January 28, 1992) was a German freestyle swimmer, born in Leipzig, who competed in the 1928 Summer Olympics.

In 1928 she finished fourth with the German relay team in the 4x100 metre freestyle relay competition.
