= Agnete Olsen =

Danish swimmer (1909–1997)

Personal information
- National team: Denmark
- Born: 22 December 1909 Copenhagen, Denmark
- Died: 13 September 1997 (aged 87)
- Relative: Rigmor Olsen

Sport
- Country: Denmark
- Sport: Swimming
- Event: Freestyle relay

Achievements and titles
- Olympic finals: 1924 Summer Olympics; 1928 Summer Olympics

Agnete Olsen (later Granholm, 22 December 1909 – 13 September 1997) was a Danish freestyle swimmer who competed in the 1924 and 1928 Summer Olympics. She was born in Copenhagen and was the sister of Rigmor Olsen. In 1924, she was a member of the Danish relay team which finished fourth in the 4×100 metre freestyle relay competition. In the 100 metre freestyle event she was eliminated in the first round. Four years later at the Amsterdam Games she was eliminated with the Danish relay team in the first round of the 4×100 metre freestyle relay competition. In the 100 metre freestyle event she was eliminated in the semi-finals.
