= Martha Norelius =

American swimmer

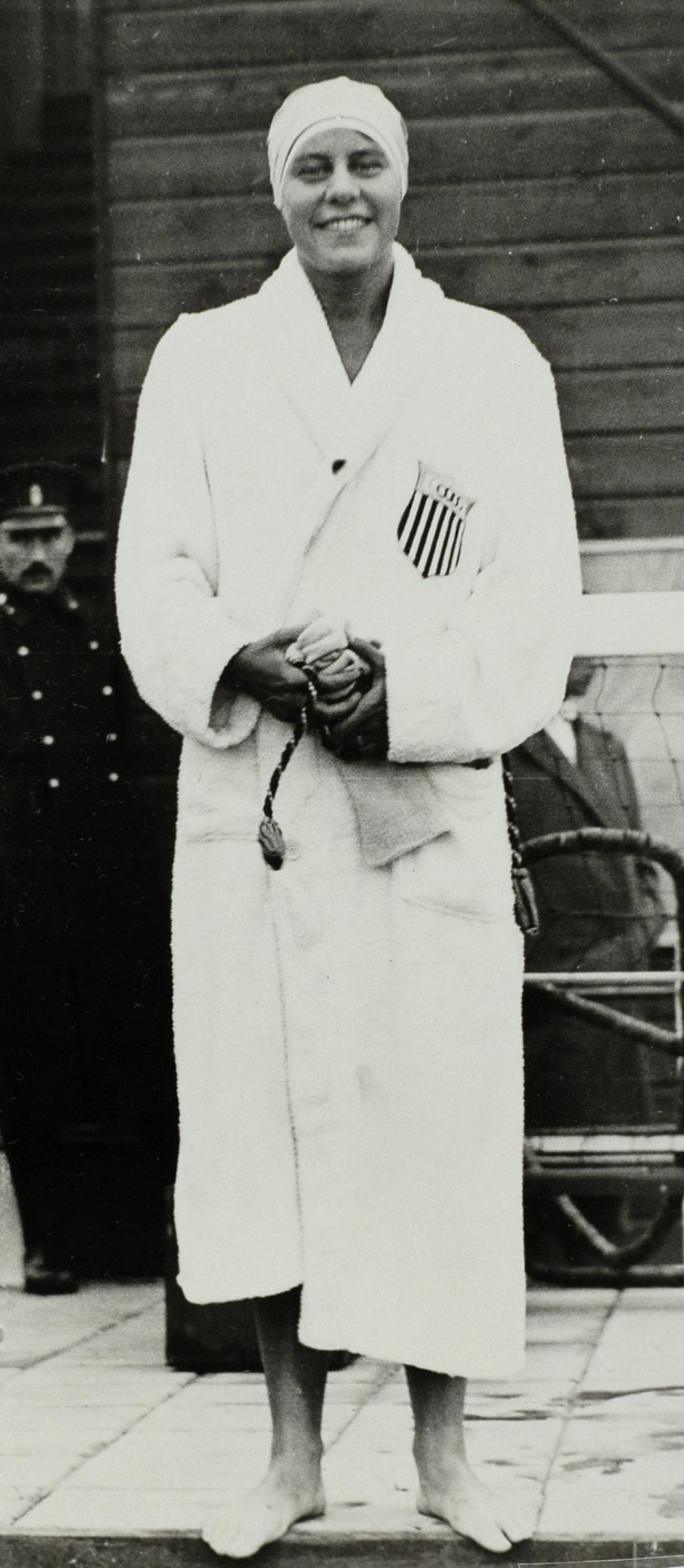
- Norelius at 1928 Olympics

Personal information
- Full name: Martha Maria Norelius
- National team: United States
- Born: January 22, 1909 Stockholm, Sweden
- Died: September 25, 1955 (aged 46) St. Louis, Missouri, U.S.

Sport
- Sport: Swimming
- Strokes: Freestyle
- Club: Women's Swimming Association
Medal record
Women's swimming
Representing the United States
Olympic Games
Gold medal – first place	1924 Paris	400 m freestyle
Gold medal – first place	1928 Amsterdam	400 m freestyle
Gold medal – first place	1928 Amsterdam	4×100 m freestyle

Martha Maria Norelius (January 22, 1909 – September 25, 1955) was a Swedish-born American competition swimmer, Olympic gold medalist, and former world record-holder in five different freestyle swimming events.

== Biography ==
Norelius was born in Stockholm, Sweden in 1909. Her father was Swedish Olympic swimmer Charles Norelius, who was also her swimming coach.

She was first recognized for her swimming and diving skills just after her seventh birthday, at an exhibition at the Greenbrier pool, where her father was a swimming instructor. He too had been an Olympic swimmer for Sweden and at the Summer Olympics 1912 in Stockholm offered a position in Florida to train the American swimming team. Daughter Martha became very good friends with top swimmer Johnny Weissmüller also trained by Marthas father Charles. At the age of 15, she represented the United States at the 1924 Summer Olympics in Paris. Norelius won the gold medal in the women's 400-meter freestyle in 1924, setting a new Olympic record (6:02.2), and edging fellow Americans Helen Wainwright (6:03.8) and Gertrude Ederle (6:04.8). Four years later, at the 1928 Summer Olympics in Amsterdam, she won two more gold medals. First, in individual competition, she won the women's 400-meter freestyle, breaking her own record with a new world mark of 5:42.8, and defeating Dutch swimmer Marie Braun by fifteen seconds. In the women's 4×100-meter freestyle relay event, Norelius and her American teammates Eleanor Garatti, Adelaide Lambert and Albina Osipowich, won the gold medal and set a new world record in the event semi-final, improving on the record in the event final with a time of 4:47.6.

Between 1925 and 1929, Norelius won eleven individual Amateur Athletic Union (AAU) titles and set at least 19 world and 30 American records. Before Australian Ariarne Titmus retained the Olympic 400m freestyle title at Paris 2024, Norelius had been the only woman to have received two Olympic back-to-back gold medals in the event.

In 1929 she turned professional and won the ten-mile Wrigley Marathon in Toronto. There she met Canadian Olympic rower Joseph Wright Jr., and later married him on March 15, 1930. They had a daughter Diane born in February 1931.

Norelius died in 1955, only 46 years old, following gall bladder surgery and was buried in Bellefontaine Cemetery. She was inducted into the International Swimming Hall of Fame as an "honor swimmer" in 1967.

== See also ==
- List of members of the International Swimming Hall of Fame
- List of multiple Olympic gold medalists
- List of Olympic medalists in swimming (women)
- World record progression 200 metres freestyle
- World record progression 400 metres freestyle
- World record progression 800 metres freestyle
- World record progression 1500 metres freestyle
- World record progression 4 × 100 metres freestyle relay

Records
Preceded by Gertrude Ederle	Women's 200-meter freestyle world record-holder (long course); February 28, 1926 – March 6, 1930	Succeeded by Helene Madison
Preceded by Gertrude Ederle	Women's 400-meter freestyle world record-holder (long course); January 23, 1927 – February 3, 1931	Succeeded by Helene Madison
Preceded by Ethel McGary	Women's 800-meter freestyle world record-holder (long course); August 7, 1926 – August 10, 1929	Succeeded by Josephine McKim
Preceded by Edith Mayne	Women's 1,500-meter freestyle world record-holder (long course); July 28, 1927 – July 15, 1931	Succeeded by Helene Madison
