= Peter Smessaert =

Belgian-born American cyclist

Personal information
- Born: July 20, 1908 Belgium
- Died: November 22, 2000 (aged 92) Baldwin, Georgia, United States

Cycling career
- Sport: Cycling

Albert Peter Smessaert (July 20, 1908 – November 22, 2000) was an American cyclist. He competed in the individual and team road race events at the 1928 Summer Olympics.
