= Eva Smits =

Dutch swimmer

Personal information
- Born: October 26, 1906 Amsterdam, Netherlands
- Died: April 23, 1992 (aged 85) Schagen, Netherlands

Sport
- Sport: Swimming

Eva Anna Gijsberta Smits (26 October 1906 – 23 April 1992) was a Dutch freestyle swimmer who competed in the 1928 Summer Olympics.

In 1928 she was also a member of the Dutch relay team which was disqualified in the final of the 4 x 100 metre freestyle relay competition, because a member of the relay team had jumped in the water too early at her changeover.
