= Gerda Bredgaard =

Danish swimmer

Personal information
- Born: 14 May 1908 Copenhagen, Denmark
- Died: 8 June 1996 (aged 88) Copenhagen, Denmark

Sport
- Sport: Swimming

Gerda Bredgaard (14 May 1908 – 8 June 1996) was a Danish swimmer. She competed in two events at the 1928 Summer Olympics.
