= Marguerite Ledoux =

French swimmer

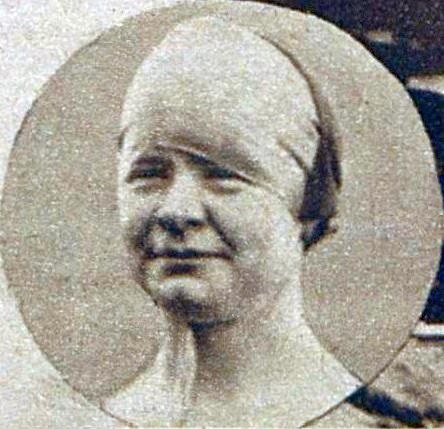

Personal information
- Full name: Marguerite Ledoux
- Born: 7 February 1906
- Died: 17 October 1963 (aged 57)

Sport
- Sport: Swimming

Marguerite Ledoux (7 February 1906 – 17 October 1963) was a French freestyle swimmer. She competed in three events at the 1928 Summer Olympics.
