= Susan Laird =

American swimmer (1908–1933)

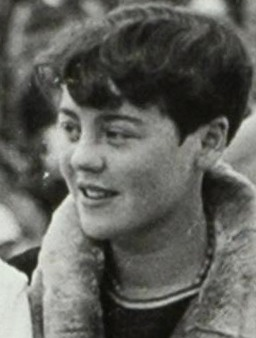
- Laird at the 1928 Olympics

Personal information
- Full name: Susanne E. Laird
- Nickname: "Susan"
- National team: United States
- Born: July 18, 1908 Homestead, Pennsylvania, U.S.
- Died: November 7, 1933 (aged 25) Pittsburgh, Pennsylvania, U.S.

Sport
- Sport: Swimming
- Strokes: Freestyle
- Club: Carnegie Library Athletic Club

Susanne E. Laird (July 18, 1908 – November 7, 1933), also known by her married name Susan Scavey, was an American competition swimmer who represented the United States at the 1928 Summer Olympics.

Laird was born in Homestead, Pennsylvania, and was one of four girls, including Josephine McKim and Lenore Kight, who trained at the Carnegie Library Athletic Club under coach Jack Scarry, her uncle, to represent the United States as members of the Olympic swim team. She began swimming at age 14 on the advice of a physician after developing St. Vitus Dance. The doctor believed swimming as a daily exercise would help to cure her nervous condition.

Laird won her first championship in 1924 at Lake Elizabeth in Pittsburgh, completing the 50-yard freestyle in 32 seconds. She placed second in the 100 meters and third in the 300-yard medley at the 1926 Sesquicentennial in Philadelphia. That year, she went on to win the national 100-yard junior championship. In 1928 she qualified for the American Olympic Team, and traveled aboard the S.S. President Roosevelt to Amsterdam, the Netherlands, for the 1928 Summer Olympics. Laird finished fifth in the women's 100-meter freestyle. She also helped the American relay team to qualify for the final of the women's 4×100-meter freestyle relay as they set a new world record in the semifinals. Laird did not receive a gold medal, even though the American team finished first in the event final, because she did not swim in the final.

After graduating from Temple University in 1930, Laird was appointed girls' coach and physical education instructor at Homestead High School, a position she held until her death from a rare blood disorder and subsequent pneumonia at age 25.

== See also ==
- List of Olympic medalists in swimming (women)
- List of Temple University people
- World record progression 4 × 100 metres freestyle relay
