= Zus Engelenberg =

South African swimmer

Personal information
- Full name: Maria Geertruida Engelenberg
- Nationality: South African
- Born: 4 January 1909 Pretoria, South Africa
- Died: 16 May 1984 (aged 75) Durban, South Africa

Sport
- Sport: Swimming

Zus Engelenberg (4 January 1909 – 16 May 1984) was a South African swimmer. She competed in the women's 100 metre freestyle event at the 1928 Summer Olympics.
