= Chester Nelsen Sr. =

American cyclist

Chester Nelsen
Personal information
- Born: October 2, 1902 Waupaca, Wisconsin, United States
- Died: October 4, 1987 (aged 85) Elsberry, Missouri, United States

Cycling career
- Sport: Cycling

Chester Nelsen (October 2, 1902 – October 4, 1987) was an American cyclist who competed in the individual and team road race events at the 1928 Summer Olympics.
