= Adelaide Lambert =

American swimmer

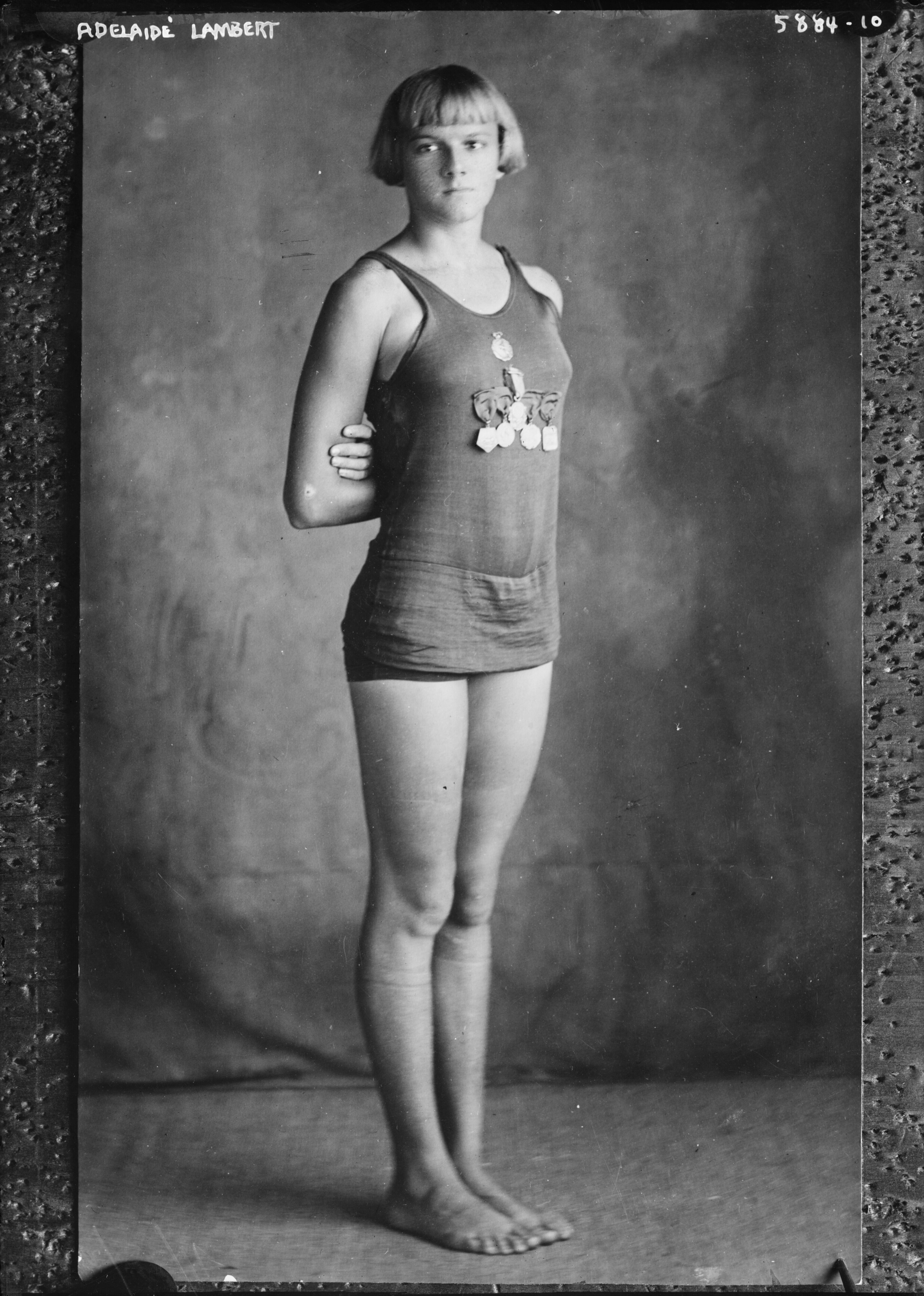
- Lambert, circa 1920, in progressive women's suit that allowed bare shoulders, legs, and feet

Personal information
- Full name: Adelaide Temperance Lambert
- National team: United States
- Born: October 27, 1907 Ancon, Panama
- Died: April 17, 1996 (aged 88) Bremerton, Washington, U.S.

Sport
- Sport: Swimming
- Strokes: Freestyle, Individual Medley
- Club: Women's Swimming Association, New York
- Coach: Louis de B. Handley (WSA, New York)
Medal record
Women's swimming
Representing the United States
Olympic Games
Gold medal – first place	1928 Amsterdam	4×100 m freestyle

Adelaide Lambert Ballard (born Adelaide Temperance Lambert; October 27, 1907 – April 17, 1996) was an American competition swimmer for the Women's Swimming Association of New York, who earned a gold medal at the 1928 Amsterdam Olympics, setting a world record in the 4×100-meter freestyle relay. She set a number of American swimming records, and set a world record in February, 1927, during the Women's National AAU Indoor Swimming Championships in Buffalo, New York, in the 300-yard medley of 4:34.4.

== Early life ==
Lambert was born on October 27, 1907, in Ancon, Panama, in the Panama Canal Zone, to Mary Adelaide Howard and Clarence Kent Lambert, a government superintendent of motor transportation. Panama was then a U.S. protectorate, and where she first learned to swim. Most American articles that detail her swimming achievements note that by the age of 14 that Cristobal, on Panama's West Coast, not Ancon where she was born, was her home. One of her early coaches was A. Mitchell of the Atlantic Water Sports Club. Lambert was known at the time for a rapid six-beat kick per arm stroke, instead of a more common three-beat kick for each arm stroke, though she used it primarily in distances under 100 yards. One of her primary coaches at the Women's Swimming Association of New York, Louis Handley, advocated as many as a 10-beat kick for each full two strokes of his swimmer's arms. Handley accepted a lower beat count, but approved of increasing the count from 4 kicks per full arm cycle. Many former coaches had considered the American crawl to have originally been designed to have four kicks to one cycle of the arms. During her youth she became an all-around Canal Zone swimming champion.

At the age of only 14, while still living in Panama, she swam 100 yards in a time of 1:09.4, approaching the American record.

== Women's Swimming Association ==
Around the age of 15, in a 220-yard handicap swum on August 8, 1923, representing the Women's Swimming Association of New York, Lambert finished first with a time of 2:51.2, in a meet sponsored by the International Printers' Tournament at Manhattan Beach. She held the 100-yard national freestyle championship that year. The Women's Swimming Association, founded by Charlotte Epstein in 1917, advocated women's swimming rights, and pushed for more comfortable suits for women that would be faster. They also advocated for the AAU to allow women as members and create more championship races for women, for women to be allowed to compete in distance races, rather than short sprints, for women to play water polo, and for women to compete in the Olympics. Many also advocated for Women's suffrage. On August 24, 1923, she set a record in the 300-meter distance of 4:29.6, bettering the former record by .2 seconds, and also set a record for the 300-yard distance. She finished ahead of the field by a full ten yards.

Lambert was the Amateur Athletic Union (AAU) champion in freestyle, backstroke, and the individual medley events. She was part of three record breaking relay teams for 1924 that included a 5x50-yard relay team, a 6×50-yard relay team and a 4×100-meter relay team that set a time of 5:00 minutes. Her 4×100-meter relay time would be significantly lowered in the 1928 Olympics. She also swam on a 4×110-yard relay team that set a 1924 record of 4:27.6, a 5x100-yard relay team that set a 1924 record of 5:35.8, and a 6×100-yard relay team that set a 1924 record of 6:47.4

== Stroke championships and records ==
At the age of 19, on Feb. 2, 1927, in Buffalo, New York, Lambert set a world record during the Women's National AAU Indoor Swimming Championships, winning the 300-yard medley in 4:34.4, bettering the former 1926 mark of Carin Nilsson by two seconds. She had won several AAU outdoor national titles by 1927, capturing the 100-yard freestyle in 1923, the 300-yard IM in 1925–1926, and the 220-yard backstroke in 1926 and 27. In August 1926, her winning National AAU Championship time at Philadelphia's Sequi Lagoon in the 220-yard backstroke was 3:15, though it did not match the National record. In January, 1927 in Miami, Florida, she broke American swimming records in the 500-meter backstroke with a time of 7:33.2, and also broke the American record in the 200-meter backstroke event with a time of 3:19.8. Her 200-meter time broke the old American record of Sybil Bauer by around 7 seconds. As part of the Women's Swimming Association, Lambert was coached by Louis de B. Handley.

== 1924 Olympic trials ==
At the 1924 Olympic trials, at Briarcliff Lodge in Scarsdale, New York, Lambert qualified, but was not able to travel with the U.S. team after she became ill just before the scheduled steamship departed for Paris. The 1924 Olympics were only the second in which women were allowed to compete. Charlotte Epstein, the founder of the Women's Swimming Association, of which Lambert was a member, managed the 1924 Women's Olympic team and served as Chaperone.

== 1928 Olympic gold medal ==
At the 1928 Olympic trial finals, Lambert finished third in the 100-meter backstroke, but did not enter this event in the Olympics that year. Charlotte Epstein, founder of the Women's Swimming Association, served as both chaperone and manager for the U.S. Women's Olympic team, and her Women's Swimming Association swimmers performed quite well in the games.

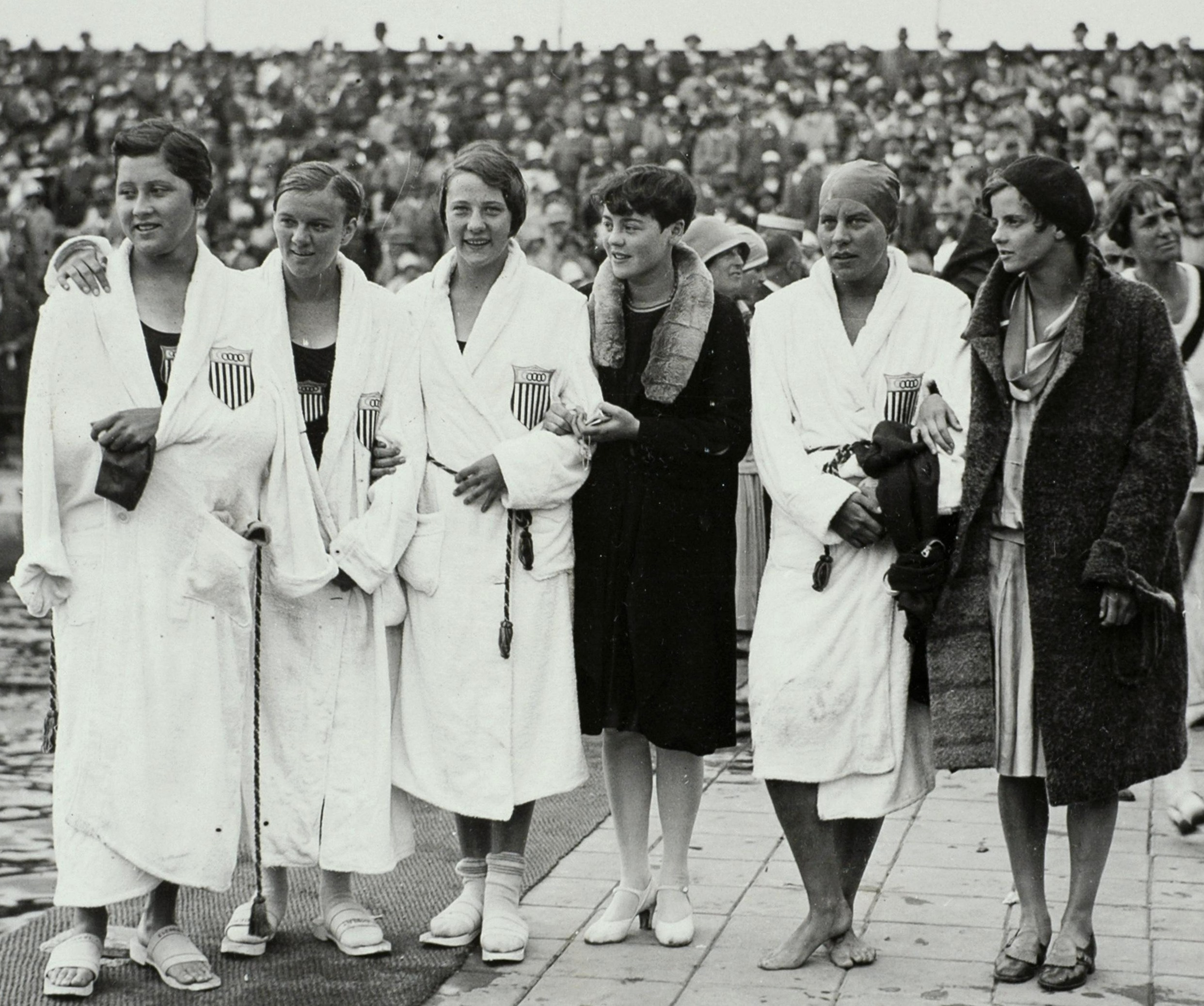
US Women 4 × 100 m team at 1928 Olympics, Lambert, second from left

At the age of 20, Lambert competed as a member of the winning U.S. team in the women's 4×100-meter freestyle relay at the August, 1928 Summer Olympics in Amsterdam, setting a new world record in both the semi-finals and the finals. Her relay team included Albina Osipowich, Eleanor Garatti and Martha Norelius. The world record had originally been set in 1924. Lambert led off the American women's team in the finals, which had a combined time of 4:47.6. By the end of the race, the American women's team had a substantial lead. Six countries competed in the finals with Great Britain taking second, finishing a full fifteen seconds behind the American team, and South Africa taking third.

In post-Olympic competition, Lambert was on the U.S. Outdoor 4 × 200 freestyle relay team that won the national championship in 1929.

Adelaide Lambert Ballard died on April 17, 1996, in Bremerton, Washington, with services held at St. Paul's Episcopal Church in Bremerton on April 23, 1996. She had been suffering from a heart ailment for several years.

== See also ==
- List of Olympic medalists in swimming (women)
- World record progression 4 × 100 metres freestyle relay
