= Eleanor Garatti =

American swimmer (1909–1998)

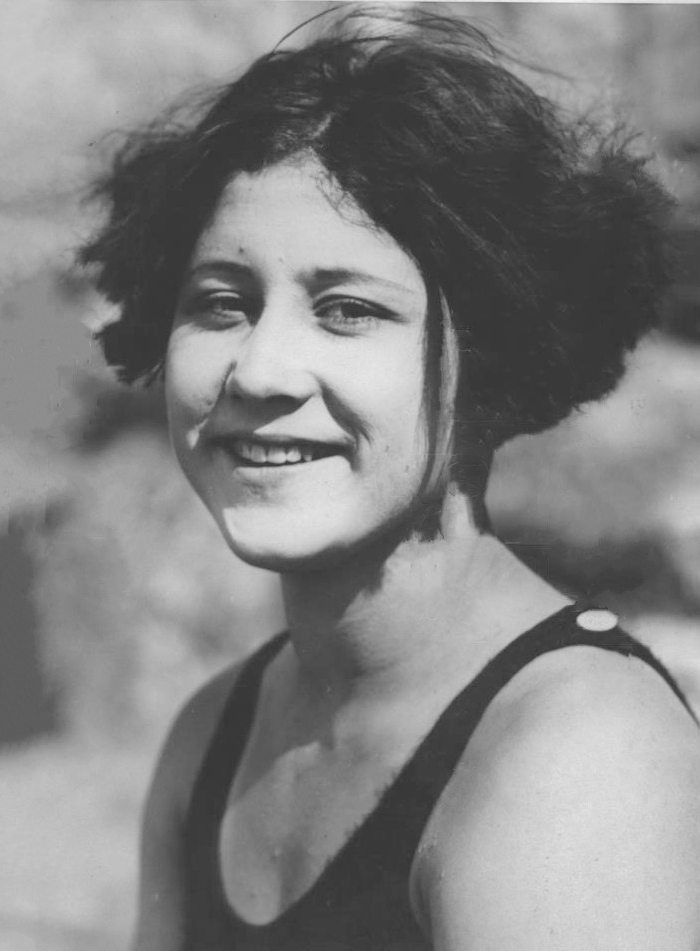
- Garatti in 1924

Personal information
- Full name: Eleanor A. Garatti
- National team: United States
- Born: July 12, 1909 Belvedere, California, U.S.
- Died: September 9, 1998 (aged 89) Walnut Creek, California, U.S.
- Spouse: Laurence Edward Saville

Sport
- Sport: Swimming
- Strokes: Freestyle
- Club: San Rafael Swim Club; Western Women's Club
- Coach: James Ward (San Rafael SC)
Medal record
Representing the United States
Olympic Games
Gold medal – first place	1928 Amsterdam	4×100 m freestyle
Silver medal – second place	1928 Amsterdam	100 m freestyle
Gold medal – first place	1932 Los Angeles	4×100 m freestyle
Bronze medal – third place	1932 Los Angeles	100 m freestyle

Eleanor A. Garatti (July 12, 1909 – September 9, 1998), later known by her married name Eleanor Saville, was an American competition swimmer for the San Rafael and Western Women's Swim Clubs, a 4x100-meter freestyle relay Olympic gold medalist in the 1928 and 1932 Olympics, and a former world record-holder in sprint freestyle events. A graduate of San Rafael High, she helped set up Marin County's first Red Cross Swimming program, and lived in San Francisco after her June, 1930 marriage to Lawrence Saville, a construction engineer.

== Early life and swimming ==
Eleanor was born one of four siblings on July 12, 1909, on Belvedere Island, California to Jennie Garatti, an Italian immigrant, and Vincenzio Garatti, a railroad worker. When she was a child in 1915 the family moved to San Rafael in the North Bay Region of San Francisco Bay. Eleanor graduated San Rafael High School in 1927, though the school lacked a girl's athletic program at the time. By 1930, she lived on San Rafael's 324 Second St., a few blocks from the San Rafael Municipal Baths where she had begun her swimming career. Familiar to the community, Garatti's family owned Garatti's Market on B Street, known for its ravioli. As a youth, Garatti swam for the San Rafael Swimming Club under the leadership of Nat Williams, Rafael Municipal Pool Manager Harold Duffy, and Coach Jim Ward. Though coaching was soon available to hone her natural talent, she was partly self-taught in her early years. When her coaches recognized her swimming talent at 15, neighborhood merchants helped send her to the National AAU Championships at the Alcazar Swimming Club in St. Augustine, Florida where on February 10, 1925, she won the 50-yard sprint event with what was then a world record time of 28.8. She later reduced her time to 27.6.

In a September 1927 meet at the San Rafael pool that featured swimming Olympian and future film star Johnny Weissmuller, Garatti lowered her 100-yard race time to 1:03.4. Lowering her time in the event and the 100-meter swim would be a focal point of her swimming career. Eleanor worked as a stenographer for the Pacific Gas and Electric Co. of San Rafael as did her coach James Ward. Depending on where she was receiving travel funds for meets, she would continue to represent San Rafael, but would later represent the Western Women's Swim Club in the late 1920's, though it was based in San Francisco.

Showing her consistency in short distance events, Garatti captured four American National Sprint Championships between 1925 and 1929.

== Brief 100-meter world record ==
Garatti in San Rafael Swimsuit

On August 7, 1929, Garatti set an AAU 100-meter world record, swimming a 1:10 in the individual 100-meter freestyle before a crowd of 500 at the National AAU Women's Swimming Meet in Honolulu. Other sources indicate she swam a 1:09.8 becoming the first woman to swim the distance in under 1:10. Returning to America from the AAU Meet in Honolulu on the USS Matsonia, she was honored with a luncheon in San Francisco, and greeted in each town on the drive from Sausalito to San Rafael by welcoming citizens and city officials, before arriving in San Rafael's Courthouse where here reception included a speech from city officials and the Mayor. She would improve on the record in the 1932 Olympics. Two and a half weeks later, in a National Meet in San Francisco on August 25, Albina Osipowich broke Garatti's short lived record for the 100-meter event by .4 seconds with a time of 1:09.4.

== Olympics ==
Garatti represented the United States at the 1928 and 1932 Summer Olympics in the 100-meter freestyle and the 4×100-meter freestyle relay. She won a silver and a bronze medal in the 100-meter freestyle, becoming the first woman to win two Olympic medals in the event. She was the only U.S. relay team member to compete at both 1928 and 1932 Olympics; on both occasions the U.S. relay team won the gold medal, breaking the world record in the process.

=== 1928 ===
With her trip sponsored by the merchants and citizens of San Rafael, Garatti attended the 1928 Olympic trials at Rockaway Beach, Queens, New York, on July 2, 1928, placing first in the 100-meter freestyle with a time of 1:10.6. Suzanne Land of Homestead, Pennsylvania finished second, and 100-meter rival Albina Opsipowich finished third. The 1928 Olympic Women's Head Swimming Coach was Bob Kiphuth.

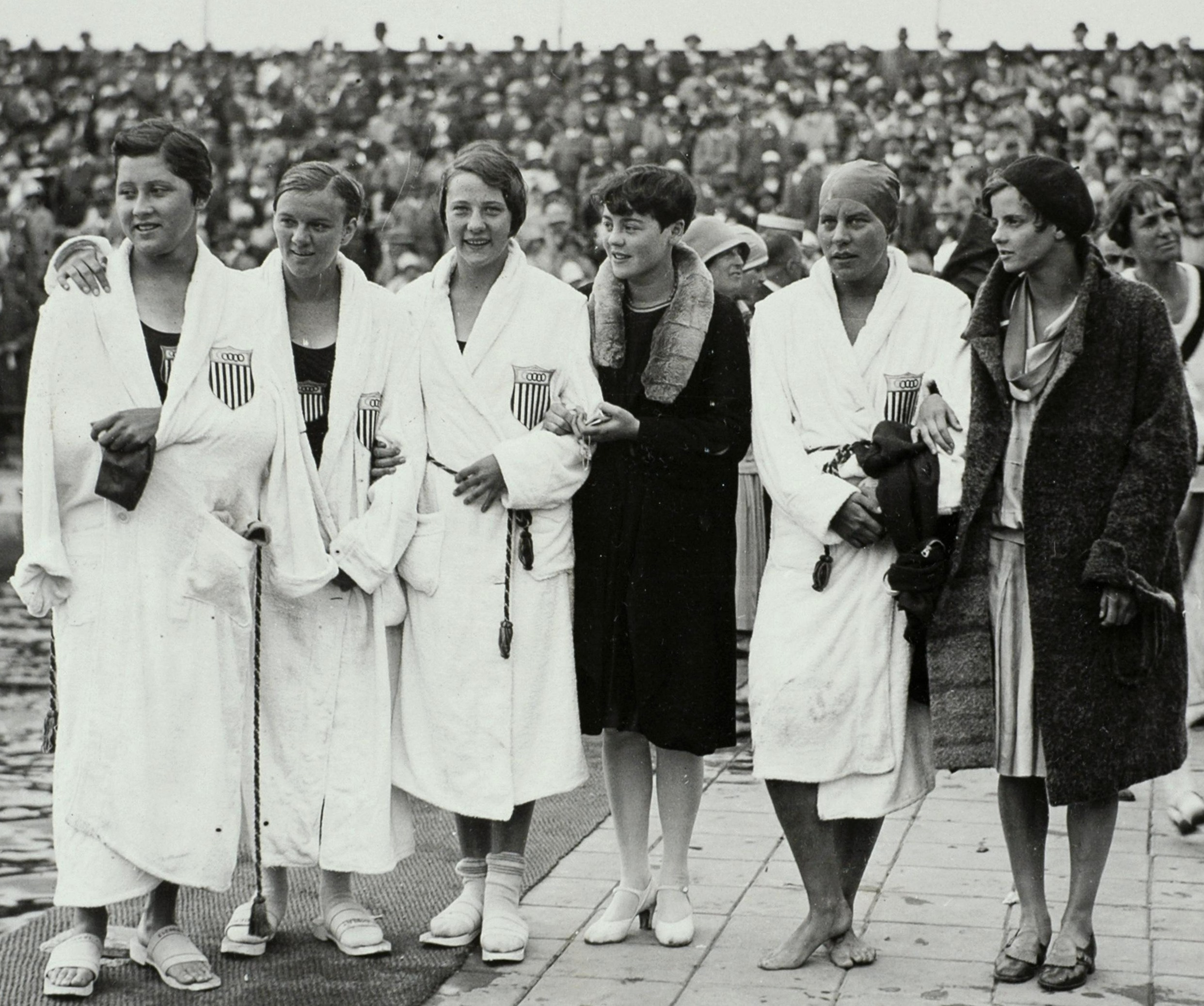
1928 US Women 4×100m team, Garatti, Lambert, Osipowich, Laird, Norelius, McKim

The gold medal winning combined time for Garatti's 4x100-meter freestyle relay team swum on August 9 in the 1928 Amsterdam Olympics was a world record 4:47.60. The women's relay team that year consisted of Adelaide Lambert, Albina Osipowich, Garatti, and Martha Norelius with Josephine McKim and Susan Laird as alternates. By the end of the race, the American women's team had a substantial lead. Six countries competed in the finals with Great Britain taking second, finishing a full fifteen seconds behind the American team, and South Africa taking third.

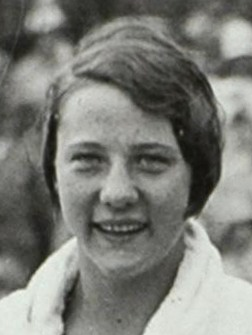
Osipowich

Garatti's individual silver medal time for the 100-meter swim in the 1928 Amsterdam Olympics was 1:11.40, finishing only .4 seconds behind Albina Osipowich who took the gold with a World Record time of 1:11. Garatti was followed by Joyce Cooper of Great Britain for the bronze and Great Britain's Jean H. McDowell in fourth place. Both Garatti and Osipowich would eventually swim the 100-meters in under 1:10, but Garatti would go under the historic 1:10 barrier before Osipowich.

In recognition of her Olympic victories, she was presented her medals by Holland's Queen Wilhelmina.

On her return from the 1928 Olympics, she took the Sausalito Ferry from San Francisco and boarded the Northwestern Pacific train Northbound to San Rafael. On her way home, the Northwestern Pacific stopped at each town so she could be greeted by city mayors and officials and welcoming residents. When the train reached San Rafael's Union Station on September 6, 1928, she was escorted by the town's police chief and three brass bands to City Hall where she was greeted by city officials.

=== 1932 ===
Garatti performed a portion of her training for the 1932 Olympics at San Francisco's Fleishhaker Pool. Her bronze medal winning time for the 100-meter freestyle in the 1932 Los Angeles Olympics was a personal best 1:08.20, which she swam on August 8, 1932, with the U.S. taking the gold, and the Netherlands taking second. Her 1932 Olympic combined time as a member of the 4x100-meter relay event, was a world record 4:38.00, with the Netherlands and Great Britain taking the silver and bronze respectively.The 1928 Olympic Women's Head Swimming Coach was Hall of Fame Coach Ray Daughters.

At 20, on June 2, 1930, Garatti married Laurence Edward Saville, 29, a San Francisco construction engineer and strong swimmer, at the Paloma Inn in San Rafael, and planned to reside in San Francisco. Eleanor's sisters Dora and Lillian acted as attendants. Eleanor continued swimming into the 1930s as Eleanor Garatti-Saville. Requiring a temporary break from training and competition, on August 28, 1930 it was reported Garatti-Saville was resting after undergoing an operation for appendicitis.

In the 1920's Garatti had been instrumental in setting up Marin County's first Red Cross Swimming program. By the early 1970's, Eleanor and her husband divided their time between homes in San Francisco, and a more scenic summer home in Healdsburg.

Garatti-Saville died on September 9, 1998, at 89 in Walnut Creek, California, and was buried in Oak Mound Cemetery in Healdsburg, Sonoma County, next to her husband Laurence who predeceased her in 1990.

=== Honors ===
Garatti was inducted into the International Swimming Hall of Fame as an "honor swimmer" in 1992.

She was also elected to the National Italian American Sports Hall of Fame in 2000.

An award in her name, the Eleanor Garatti-Saville Fund, was created through a bequest from Dora Hartford, Eleanor's sister, to provide stipends to Olympic hopefuls. Inaugural grants of $5,000 each were awarded to three aquatic athletes in 2010.

== See also ==
- List of members of the International Swimming Hall of Fame
- World record progression 4 × 100 metres freestyle relay

Records
Preceded by Ethel Lackie	Women's 100-meter freestyle world record-holder (long course); 7 August 1929 – 25 August 1929	Succeeded by Albina Osipowich
