= Rhoda Rennie =

South African swimmer (1905–1963)

Personal information
- Born: 2 May 1905 Benoni, Gauteng, South Africa
- Died: 11 March 1963 (aged 57) Johannesburg, South Africa

Sport
- Sport: Swimming
Medal record
Representing South Africa
Olympic Games
Bronze medal – third place	1928 Amsterdam	4×100 m freestyle

Rhoda Lillian Rennie (2 May 1905 in Benoni – 11 March 1963) was a South African freestyle swimmer who competed in the 1928 Summer Olympics.

In 1928 she was a member of the South African relay team which won the bronze medal in the 4×100 m freestyle relay event. She also competed in the 100 metre freestyle competition and in the 400 metre freestyle event, but was in both eliminated in the first round.

Rennie committed suicide in Johannesburg in 1963.
