= Mary Bedford =

East African swimmer

Personal information
- Born: March 27, 1907
- Died: September 8, 1997 (aged 90)

Sport
- Sport: Swimming
Medal record
Representing South Africa
Olympic Games
Bronze medal – third place	1928 Amsterdam	4×100 m freestyle

Mary Esther Bedford (27 March 1907 – 8 September 1997 in Durban) was a South African freestyle swimmer who competed in the 1928 Summer Olympics.

In 1928 she was a member of the South African relay team which won the bronze medal in the 4 × 100 m freestyle relay event. She also competed in the 400 metre freestyle competition, but was eliminated in the first round.
