= Maria Vierdag =

Dutch swimmer

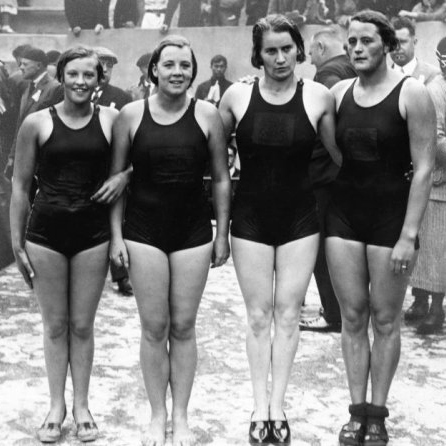
- Dutch 4×100 m team at the 1931 European Championships. Vierdag is right.

Personal information
- Born: 22 September 1905 Amersfoort, the Netherlands
- Died: 17 July 2005 (aged 99) Amsterdam, the Netherlands
- Height: 1.70 m (5 ft 7 in)

Sport
- Sport: Swimming
- Club: AZ&PC, Amersfoort
Medal record
Representing the Netherlands
Olympic Games
Silver medal – second place	1932 Los Angeles	4×100 m freestyle
European Championships
Gold medal – first place	1927 Bologna	100 m freestyle
Silver medal – second place	1927 Bologna	4×100 m freestyle
Gold medal – first place	1931 Paris	4×100 m freestyle

Maria "Rie" Vierdag (22 September 1905 – 17 July 2005) was a Dutch freestyle swimmer who competed at the 1924, 1928 and 1932 Summer Olympics. She won a silver medal in the 4×100 m relay in 1932, setting a European record, and finished sixth in 1924. She failed to reach the 100 m finals at all Games.

Vierdag was a European champion in the 100 m in 1927 and in the 4×100 m relay in 1931. In 1927 she finished her 100 m race in the same time as Joyce Cooper, and an addition trial was arranged between them. Cooper was too tired to attend it, and Vierdag was announced as the winner.

Nationally Vierdag set eight Dutch records, yet won only one national title, in the 100 m in 1929. In retirement she worked as a physical education teacher and physical therapist.
