= Kathleen Russell (swimmer) =

South African swimmer (1912–1992)

Personal information
- Born: November 17, 1912
- Died: November 26, 1992 (aged 80)

Sport
- Sport: Swimming
Medal record
Representing South Africa
Olympic Games
Bronze medal – third place	1928 Amsterdam	4×100 m freestyle
British Empire Games
Silver medal – second place	1934 London	4×100 yd freestyle

Kathleen Russell (17 November 1912 – 26 November 1992) was a South African freestyle swimmer who competed in the 1928 Summer Olympics.

In 1928 she was a member of the South African relay team which won the bronze medal in the 4×100 m freestyle relay event. She also competed in the 400 metre freestyle competition, but was eliminated in the semi-finals.

At the 1934 Empire Games she won the silver medal with the South African team in the 4×100 yards freestyle relay contest.
