= Marie Braun =

Dutch swimmer (1911–1982)

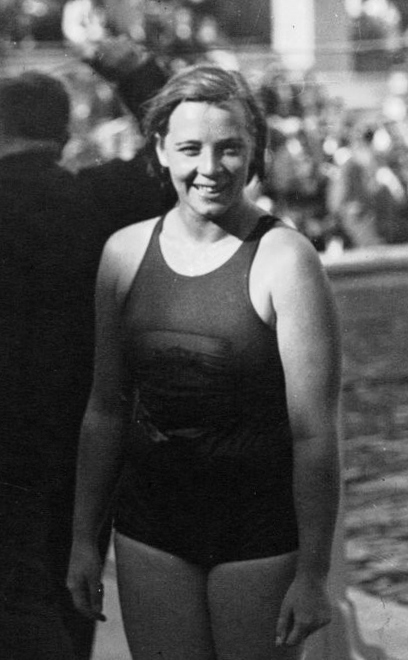
- Braun at the 1931 European Championships

Personal information
- Full name: Maria Johanna Philipsen-Braun
- National team: Netherlands
- Born: 22 June 1911 Rotterdam, the Netherlands
- Died: 23 June 1982 (aged 71) Gouda, the Netherlands
- Height: 1.70 m (5 ft 7 in)

Sport
- Sport: Swimming
- Strokes: Backstroke, Freestyle
Medal record
Representing Netherlands
Olympic Games
Gold medal – first place	1928 Amsterdam	100 m backstroke
Silver medal – second place	1928 Amsterdam	400 m freestyle
European Championships
Gold medal – first place	1927 Bologna	400 m freestyle
Silver medal – second place	1927 Bologna	100 m backstroke
Silver medal – second place	1927 Bologna	4×100 m freestyle
Gold medal – first place	1931 Paris	400 m freestyle
Gold medal – first place	1931 Paris	100 m backstroke
Gold medal – first place	1931 Paris	4×100 m freestyle

Maria "Marie" Johanna Philipsen-Braun (22 June 1911 – 23 June 1982), also known as Zus Braun, was a Dutch swimmer. She competed in the 1928 Summer Olympics in Amsterdam and in 1932 in Los Angeles, winning a gold medal in the 100 m backstroke and a silver in the 400 m freestyle in 1928. She failed to reach the finals of these events at the 1932 Games due to a sudden illness during the preliminary heats. During her career Braun set six world and 25 national records.

Braun was the daughter of the prominent Dutch swimming coach Ma Braun. She had her first international success at the 1927 European Championships, where she won one gold (400 m freestyle) and two bronze medals (4 × 100 m freestyle and 100 m backstroke). She won gold medals in these events at the next European championships in 1931. After these wins and her medals at the 1928 Olympics, Braun was a favorite at the 1932 Olympics. However, after swimming the 400 m heats she was hospitalized with a strong fever, and retired from swimming shortly after that. In 1980, she was inducted into the International Swimming Hall of Fame.

== Suspected poisoning ==
During the 1932 Olympic swimming competition in Los Angeles, Braun suddenly became very ill and was hospitalized for three weeks with a high fever. When she returned to the Netherlands, she gave a press statement stating that between events, she suddenly felt a pain in her leg and that two young American men who had been sitting in front of her in the stands and had been watching her suspiciously, "disappeared". There was a suspicion this was linked to illegal gambling on the final events.

== See also ==
- List of members of the International Swimming Hall of Fame
