= Josephine McKim =

American swimmer (1910–1992)

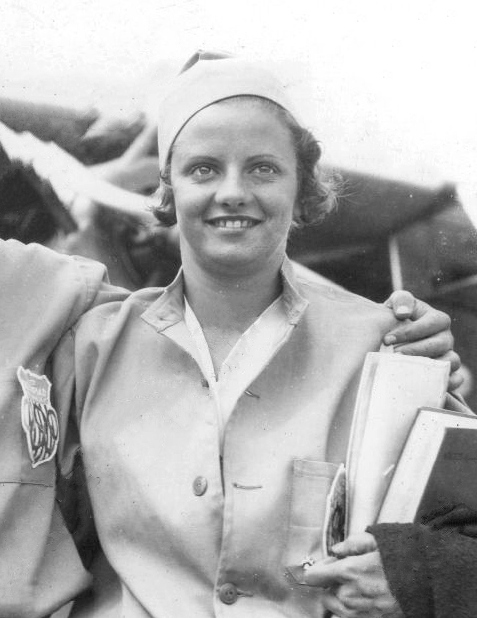
- McKim in 1932

Personal information
- Full name: Josephine Eveline McKim
- Born: January 4, 1910 Oil City, Pennsylvania, U.S.
- Died: December 10, 1992 (aged 82) Woodstock, New York, U.S.

Sport
- Sport: Swimming
- Strokes: Freestyle
- Club: Carnegie Library Athletic Club
Medal record
Representing the United States
Olympic Games
Gold medal – first place	1932 Los Angeles	4×100 m freestyle
Bronze medal – third place	1928 Amsterdam	400 m freestyle

Josephine Eveline McKim (January 4, 1910 – December 10, 1992), also known by her married name Josephine Chalmers, was an American swimmer who won three medals at the 1928 and 1932 Olympics. In 1928 she won the bronze medal in the 400-meter freestyle event. She also swam in the first heat of 4×100-meter freestyle relay, but was replaced by Eleanor Garatti in the final. Four years later she won the gold medal in the 4×100-meter freestyle relay and was fourth in the 100-meter freestyle. During her career McKim set five world records in various freestyle events.

McKim served as the body double for Maureen O'Sullivan in a deleted nude underwater scene from MGM's adventure film, Tarzan and His Mate (1934), which has since been restored to home video releases. She also had a bit part in Universal's Bride of Frankenstein (1935) as a mermaid, one of Dr. Pretorius' "miniaturized" people. This role was reprised in Columbia's The King Steps Out. She also appeared with her Olympic teammate Buster Crabbe in Lady Be Careful (1936). Both attended the University of Southern California. Later she had a stage career on Broadway (1938 to 1942) appearing in "Family Portrait" (1939) with Judith Anderson and Tom Ewell at the Morosco Theater and a Lee Strasburg production "Dance Night" (1938) among several others. She married her husband, John "Jack" Chalmers, in 1947. Her older sister, Musa McKim Guston, was the spouse of painter Philip Guston and a painter in her own right, as well as a published poet.

McKim was inducted into the International Swimming Hall of Fame as an "Honor Swimmer" in 1991.

She and her sister were born in Oil City, Pennsylvania, and both died in Woodstock, New York in 1992.

== See also ==
- List of members of the International Swimming Hall of Fame
- List of Olympic medalists in swimming (women)
- World record progression 800 metres freestyle
- World record progression 4 × 100 metres freestyle relay
