= Swimming at the 1920 Summer Olympics – Women's 300 metre freestyle =

Women's 300 metre freestyle at the Games of the VII Olympiad
- Venue: Stade Nautique d'Antwerp
- Dates: 26 August 1920 (semifinals); 28 August 1920 (final)
- Competitors: 16 from 7 nations
- Winning time: 4:34.0 WR

Medalists
| 1st place, gold medalist(s) | | Ethelda Bleibtrey | United States |
| 2nd place, silver medalist(s) | | Margaret Woodbridge | United States |
| 3rd place, bronze medalist(s) | | Frances Schroth | United States |

The women's 300 metre freestyle was a swimming event held as part of the swimming at the 1920 Summer Olympics programme. It was the first appearance of the event, which was later adjusted to 400 metres to match the men's competition.

A total of 16 swimmers from seven nations competed in the event, which was held on Thursday, August 26 and on Saturday, August 28, 1920.

== Records ==
These were the standing world and Olympic records (in minutes) prior to the 1920 Summer Olympics.

| World record | 4:56.2 | (Australia) Fanny Durack | ? | 1912 |
| Olympic record | - | none | - | - |

In the first semi-final Ethelda Bleibtrey set a new world record with 4:41.4 minutes. She bettered her own record in the final with 4:34.0 minutes.

== Results ==
=== Semifinals ===
Thursday, August 26, 1920: The fastest two in each semi-final and the fastest third-placed from across the semi-finals advanced.

Semifinal 1

| Place | Swimmer | Time | Qual. |
|---|---|---|---|
| 1 | Ethelda Bleibtrey (USA) | 4:41.4 | Q WR |
| 2 | Constance Jeans (GBR) | 4:57.8 | Q |
| 3 | Carin Nilsson (SWE) | 5:07.0 | |
| 4 | Hilda James (GBR) | 5:07.2 | |
| 5 | Lily Beaurepaire (AUS) | | |

Semifinal 2

| Place | Swimmer | Time | Qual. |
|---|---|---|---|
| 1 | Margaret Woodbridge (USA) | 4:56.6 | Q |
| 2 | Violet Walrond (NZL) | 5:04.6 | Q |
| 3 | Jane Gylling (SWE) | 5:04.8 | q |
| 4 | Grace McKenzie (GBR) | | |
| 5 | Ernestine Lebrun (FRA) | | |

Semifinal 3

| Place | Swimmer | Time | Qual. |
|---|---|---|---|
| 1 | Eleanor Uhl (USA) | 5:02.0 | Q |
| 2 | Frances Schroth (USA) | 5:03.2 | Q |
| 3 | Aina Berg (SWE) | 5:29.6 | |
| 4 | Suzanne Wurtz (FRA) | 5:33.0 | |
| 5 | Florence Sancroft (GBR) | | |
| 6 | Blanche Nash (RSA) | | |

=== Final ===
Saturday, August 28, 1920:

| Place | Swimmer | Time |
|---|---|---|
| 1 | Ethelda Bleibtrey (USA) | 4:34.0 WR |
| 2 | Margaret Woodbridge (USA) | 4:42.8 |
| 3 | Frances Schroth (USA) | 4:52.0 |
| 4 | Constance Jeans (GBR) | 4:52.4 |
| 5 | Eleanor Uhl (USA) | |
| 6 | Jane Gylling (SWE) | |
| 7 | Violet Walrond (NZL) | |
