= Swimming at the 1920 Summer Olympics – Women's 100 metre freestyle =

Women's 100 metre freestyle at the Games of the VII Olympiad
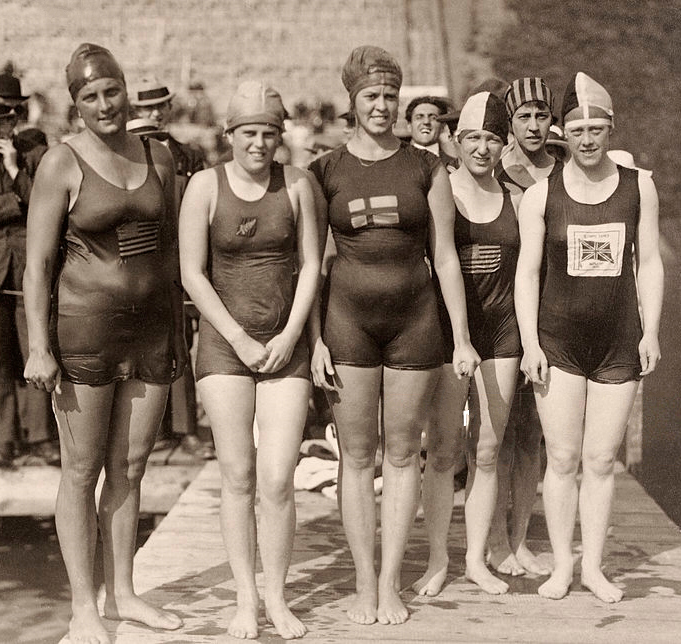
- 100 m finalists, left-right: Ethelda Bleibtrey, Violet Walrond, Jane Gylling, Irene Guest, Frances Schroth and Constance Jeans
- Venue: Stade Nautique d'Antwerp
- Dates: August 23–25
- Competitors: 19 from 9 nations

Medalists
1st place, gold medalist(s)		Ethelda Bleibtrey	United States
2nd place, silver medalist(s)		Irene Guest	United States
3rd place, bronze medalist(s)		Frances Schroth	United States

The women's 100 metre freestyle was a swimming event held as part of the swimming at the 1920 Summer Olympics programme. It was the second appearance of the event, which was one of the two women's events held in 1912.

A total of 19 swimmers from nine nations competed in the event, which was held on Monday, August 23 and on Wednesday, August 25, 1920.

== Records ==
These were the standing world and Olympic records (in minutes) prior to the 1920 Summer Olympics.

World record	1:16.2	(Australia) Fanny Durack	Sydney (AUS)	February 6, 1915
Olympic record	1:19.8	(Australia) Fanny Durack	Stockholm (SWE)	July 11, 1912

Frances Schroth broke the Olympic record in the first semifinal with a time of 1 minute 18.0 seconds. Ethelda Bleibtrey broke the world record in the third semifinal with 1 minute 14.4 seconds and lowered her own new record again in the final with 1 minute 13.6 seconds.

== Results ==
=== Semifinals ===
Monday, August 23, 1920: The fastest two in each semi-final and the fastest third-placed from across the semi-finals advanced.

Semifinal 1

Place	Swimmer	Time	Qual.
1	Frances Schroth (USA)	1:18.0	Q OR
2	Charlotte Boyle (USA)	1:20.4	Q
3	Rie Beisenherz (NED)	1:22.6	
4	Yvonne Degraine (FRA)		
5	Aina Berg (SWE)		
6	Lillian Birkenhead (GBR)		

Semifinal 2

Place	Swimmer	Time	Qual.
1	Irene Guest (USA)	1:18.8	Q
2	Constance Jeans (GBR)	1:20.8	Q
3	Violet Walrond (NZL)	1:21.4	q
4	Germaine Van Dievoet (BEL)		
5	Suzanne Wurtz (FRA)		
6	Carin Nilsson (SWE)		
7	Charlotte Radcliffe (GBR)		

Semifinal 3

Place	Swimmer	Time	Qual.
1	Ethelda Bleibtrey (USA)	1:14.4	Q WR
2	Jane Gylling (SWE)	1:25.6	Q
3	Grace McKenzie (GBR)	1:27.4	
4	Ernestine Lebrun (FRA)		
5	Blanche Nash (RSA)		
6	Lily Beaurepaire (AUS)		

=== Final ===
Wednesday, August 25, 1920:

Place	Swimmer	Time
1	Ethelda Bleibtrey (USA)	1:13.6 WR
2	Irene Guest (USA)	1:17.0
3	Frances Schroth (USA)	1:17.2
4	Constance Jeans (GBR)	1:22.8
5	Violet Walrond (NZL)	
6	Jane Gylling (SWE)	
—	Charlotte Boyle (USA)	DNF

== Notes ==
- Belgium Olympic Committee (1957). Olympic Games Antwerp 1920: Official Report (in French).
- Wudarski, Pawel (1999). "Wyniki Igrzysk Olimpijskich" (in Polish).
