= Swimming at the 1924 Summer Olympics – Women's 100 metre freestyle =

Women's 100 meter freestyle at the Games of the VIII Olympiad
- Date: 19–20 July
- Competitors: 16 from 7 nations

Medalists
1st place, gold medalist(s)		Ethel Lackie	United States
2nd place, silver medalist(s)		Mariechen Wehselau	United States
3rd place, bronze medalist(s)		Gertrude Ederle	United States

The women's 100 metre freestyle was a swimming event held as part of the swimming at the 1924 Summer Olympics programme. It was the third appearance of the event, which was established in 1912. The competition was held on Saturday 19 July 1924, and on Sunday 20 July 1924.

== Records ==
These were the standing world and Olympic records (in minutes) prior to the 1924 Summer Olympics.

World record	1:12.8	(United States) Gertrude Ederle	Newark (USA)	30 June 1923
Olympic record	1:13.6	(United States) Ethelda Bleibtrey	Antwerp (BEL)	25 August 1920

In the first heat Mariechen Wehselau set a new world record with 1 minute 12.2 seconds.

== Results ==
=== Heats ===
The fastest two in each heat and the fastest third-placed from across the heats advanced.

Heat 1

Place	Swimmer	Time	Qual.
1	Mariechen Wehselau (USA)	1:12.2	QQ WR
2	Iris Tanner (GBR)	1:22.4	QQ
3	Agnete Olsen (DEN)	1:23.0	

Heat 2

Place	Swimmer	Time	Qual.
1	Ethel Lackie (USA)	1:12.8	QQ
2	Florence Barker (GBR)	1:20.8	QQ
3	Ernestine Lebrun (FRA)	1:23.4	
4	Wivan Pettersson (SWE)	1:27.4	
5	Karen Maud Rasmussen (DEN)	1:29.0	

Heat 3

Place	Swimmer	Time	Qual.
1	Gertrude Ederle (USA)	1:12.6	QQ
2	Mariette Protin (FRA)	1:22.2	QQ
3	Hedevig Rasmussen (DEN)	1:22.4	
4	Gurli Ewerlund (SWE)	1:23.2	

Heat 4

Place	Swimmer	Time	Qual.
1	Constance Jeans (GBR)	1:16.0	QQ
2	Gwitha Shand (NZL)	1:21.0	QQ
3	Maria Vierdag (NED)	1:22.0	qq
4	Hjördis Töpel (SWE)	1:25.8	

=== Semifinals ===
The fastest two in each semi-final and the faster of the two third-placed swimmer advanced to the final.

Semifinal 1

Place	Swimmer	Time	Qual.
1	Mariechen Wehselau (USA)	1:15.2	QF
2	Ethel Lackie (USA)	1:16.0	QF
3	Iris Tanner (GBR)	1:18.6	qf
4	Maria Vierdag (NED)	1:21.2	
5	Florence Barker (GBR)	1:21.4	

Semifinal 2

Place	Swimmer	Time	Qual.
1	Gertrude Ederle (USA)	1:15.4	QF
2	Constance Jeans (GBR)	1:16.6	QF
3	Gwitha Shand (NZL)	1:22.4	
4	Mariette Protin (FRA)	1:22.8	

=== Final ===
Place	Swimmer	Time
1	Ethel Lackie (USA)	1:12.4
2	Mariechen Wehselau (USA)	1:12.8
3	Gertrude Ederle (USA)	1:14.2
4	Constance Jeans (GBR)	1:15.4
5	Iris Tanner (GBR)	1:20.8
