= Swimming at the 1924 Summer Olympics – Women's 4 × 100 metre freestyle relay =

Women's 4 × 100 metre freestyle relay at the Games of the VIII Olympiad
- Venue: Piscine des Tourelles
- Date: 18 July 1924
- Competitors: 24 from 6 nations
- Teams: 6
- Winning time: 4:58.8 WR

Medalists
1st place, gold medalist(s)		Euphrasia Donnelly, Gertrude Ederle, Ethel Lackie, Mariechen Wehselau; United States
2nd place, silver medalist(s)		Florence Barker, Constance Jeans, Grace McKenzie, Iris Tanner; Great Britain
3rd place, bronze medalist(s)		Aina Berg, Gurli Ewerlund, Wivan Pettersson, Hjördis Töpel; Sweden

The women's 4 × 100 metre freestyle relay was a swimming event held as part of the swimming at the 1924 Summer Olympics programme. It was the third appearance of the event, which had been established in 1912. The competition was held on Friday 18 July 1924.

== Records ==
These were the standing world and Olympic records (in minutes) prior to the 1924 Summer Olympics.

World record	5:11.6	(United States) Margaret Woodbridge (United States) Frances Schroth (United States) Irene Guest (United States) Ethelda Bleibtrey	Antwerp (BEL)	29 August 1920
Olympic record	5:11.6	(United States) Margaret Woodbridge (United States) Frances Schroth (United States) Irene Guest (United States) Ethelda Bleibtrey	Antwerp (BEL)	29 August 1920

The United States set a new world record and broke the five-minute barrier with 4:58.8 minutes.

== Results ==
=== Final ===
Place	Swimmers	Time
1	Euphrasia Donnelly, Gertrude Ederle, Ethel Lackie, and Mariechen Wehselau (USA)	4:58.8 WR
2	Florence Barker, Constance Jeans, Grace McKenzie, and Iris Tanner (GBR)	5:17.0
3	Aina Berg, Gurli Ewerlund, Wivan Pettersson, and Hjördis Töpel (SWE)	5:35.6
4	Vibeke Møller, Agnete Olsen, Hedevig Rasmussen, and Karen Maud Rasmussen (DEN)	5:42.4
5	Ernestine Lebrun, Gilberte Mortier, Bienna Pélégry, and Mariette Protin (FRA)	5:43.4
6	Mietje Baron, Alida Bolten, Truus Klapwijk, and Maria Vierdag (NED)	5:45.8
