= New Zealand at the 1924 Summer Olympics =

- IOC code: NZL
- NOC: Olympic Council of New Zealand
- Website: www.olympic.org.nz

in Paris
- Competitors: 4 in 3 sports
- Flag bearer: Arthur Porritt (athlete)
- Medals Ranked 23rd: Gold 0 Silver 0 Bronze 1 Total 1

Summer Olympics appearances (overview)
- 1908; 1912; 1920; 1924; 1928; 1932; 1936; 1948; 1952; 1956; 1960; 1964; 1968; 1972; 1976; 1980; 1984; 1988; 1992; 1996; 2000; 2004; 2008; 2012; 2016; 2020; 2024

Other related appearances
- Australasia (1908–1912)

New Zealand competed at the 1924 Summer Olympics in Paris, France. The team consisted of four competitors: an athlete (Arthur Porritt), a boxer (Charlie Purdy), and two swimmers (Clarrie Heard and Gwitha Shand). Porritt was also the team's manager, and he won the nation's first medal in athletics.

== Medallists ==
Medal	Name	Sport	Event	Date
Bronze	Arthur Porritt	Athletics	Men's 100 m	7 July

== Delegation ==
The New Zealand Olympic Council decided on the New Zealand representatives at their meeting in Wellington on 11 March 1924 that subject to funding becoming available, fourteen competitors for four disciplines would be put sent to Paris. But in the end, only four competitors were sent.

A New Zealand rowing eight was to be sent, i.e. eight rowers and one cox. The rowers were Clarrie Healey, W. Ryland, H. Sharpe, and W. Coombes (all from Wanganui), C. J. Adams, R. G. Croudis, E. T. Hegglun, and W. Pinkham (all from Blenheim), and W. Sergison (Christchurch). The biggest challenge at the time was a lack of funds and ultimately, the necessary money could not be raised and no rowers were sent. Darcy Hadfield was a dominant single sculler at the time but he had become professional in 1922 and was thus no longer eligible to compete at the Olympics.

Randolph Rose was the Australasian champion over 3 miles and was one of the Olympic nominees, but he was operated for appendicitis in March 1924 and could not go to Paris. The other athletics competitors, Arthur Porritt, was at the time studying in England as a Rhodes scholar at Magdalen College in Oxford. In June 1924, Porritt was appointed captain and manager of the team. The secretary for the team in New Zealand was Philip Rundle, who would be Chef de Mission in 1932.

Another New Zealander, Ernest "Buz" Sutherland from Palmerston North, competed for South Africa finishing fifth in the decathlon.

The New Zealanders did not travel as a team to Paris. Porritt made his way from Oxford to France. Purdy left Auckland on 19 April by the Ulimaroa for Sydney, where he joined the Australian boxing team. The boxers left Sydney on the Ormonde on 30 April. Shand left Auckland on the Niagara on 13 May.

== Results and competitors by event ==
=== Athletics ===
A single athlete represented New Zealand in 1924. It was the nation's second appearance in the sport as well as the Games, though New Zealanders had previously competed in 1908 and 1912 in the Australasia combined team. Porritt won the nation's first medal in the sport with a bronze in the 100 metres. The 100 metres competition was held on 6 and 7 July, and the 200 metres competition was held on 8 and 9 July.

Ranks given are within the heat.

Athlete	Event	Heats		Quarterfinals		Semifinals		Final	
Athlete	Event	Result	Rank	Result	Rank	Result	Rank	Result	Rank
Arthur Porritt	100 m	Unknown	2 Q	10.9	2 Q	11.1	2 Q	10.8	3rd place, bronze medalist(s)
Arthur Porritt	200 m	22.4	1 Q	22.0	1 Q	22.6	6	did not advance	

=== Boxing ===
A single boxer represented New Zealand at the 1924 Games. It was the nation's debut in the sport. Purdy lost his only bout on 16 July.

Boxer	Weight class	Round of 32	Round of 16	Quarterfinals	Semifinals	Final / Bronze match	
Boxer	Weight class	Opposition Score	Opposition Score	Opposition Score	Opposition Score	Opposition Score	Rank
Charlie Purdy	Lightweight	Tholey (FRA); L	did not advance				17

Opponent nation	Wins	Losses	Percent
France	0	1	.000
Total	0	1	.000

Round	Wins	Losses	Percent
Round of 32	0	1	.000
Round of 16	0	0	–
Quarterfinals	0	0	–
Semifinals	0	0	–
Final	0	0	–
Bronze match	0	0	–
Total	0	1	.000

=== Swimming ===
In the women's 400 metre freestyle, Shand won her heat on 13 July, and she qualified in the semi-final the following day by coming third. She did not compete in the final on 15 July, though.

In the men's 200 metre breaststroke, Heard came third in his heat on 15 July. As only the first two would automatically advance to the semi-final, and Heard didn't have the fastest third-placed time across the five heats, he was eliminated.

In the women's 100 metre freestyle, Shand came second in her heat on 19 July, and she thus advanced to the semi-final. The following day, she came third in her semi-final, but Great Britain's Vera Tanner came third in the other semi-final with a faster time, hence Shand was eliminated.

Ranks given are within the heat.

Men

Swimmer	Event	Heats		Semifinals		Final	
Swimmer	Event	Result	Rank	Result	Rank	Result	Rank
Clarrie Heard	200 m breaststroke	3:09.0	3	did not advance			

Women

Swimmer	Event	Heats		Semifinals		Final	
Swimmer	Event	Result	Rank	Result	Rank	Result	Rank
Gwitha Shand	100 m freestyle	1:21.0	2 Q	1:22.4	3	did not advance	
Gwitha Shand	400 m freestyle	6:23.6	1 Q	6:24.4	3 q	DNF	—
