= Swimming at the 1924 Summer Olympics – Women's 400 metre freestyle =

Women's 400 metre freestyle at the Games of the VIII Olympiad
- Venue: Piscine des Tourelles
- Date: 13 July 1924 (heats); 14 July 1924 (semifinals); 15 July 1924 (final)
- Competitors: 18 from 8 nations
- Winning time: 6:02.2 OR

Medalists
1st place, gold medalist(s)		Martha Norelius	United States
2nd place, silver medalist(s)		Helen Wainwright	United States
3rd place, bronze medalist(s)		Gertrude Ederle	United States

The women's 400 metre freestyle was a swimming event held as part of the swimming at the 1924 Summer Olympics programme. It was the first appearance of the event, in 1920 a 300-metre race was contested. The competition was held from Sunday 13 July 1924, to Tuesday 15 July 1924.

== Records ==
These were the standing world and Olympic records (in minutes) prior to the 1924 Summer Olympics.

World record	5:53.2	(United States) Gertrude Ederle	Indianapolis (USA)	4 August 1922
Olympic record	-	none	-	-

In the first heat Gertrude Ederle set the first Olympic record for this event with 6:12.2 minutes. In the final Martha Norelius won with the new Olympic record of 6:02.2 minutes.

== Results ==
=== Heats ===
Sunday 13 July 1924: The fastest two in each heat and the fastest third-placed from across the heats advanced.

Heat 1

Place	Swimmer	Time	Qual.
1	Gertrude Ederle (USA)	6:12.2	QQ OR
2	Doris Molesworth (GBR)	6:28.6	QQ
3	Hedevig Rasmussen (DEN)	6:58.2	qq
4	Gurli Ewerlund (SWE)	7:05.4	
5	Ernestine Lebrun (FRA)	7:06.4	

Heat 2

Place	Swimmer	Time	Qual.
1	Martha Norelius (USA)	6:23.2	QQ
2	Constance Jeans (GBR)	6:34.6	QQ
3	Truus Klapwijk (NED)	7:15.0	
4	Gilberte Mortier (FRA)	7:35.0	

Heat 3

Place	Swimmer	Time	Qual.
1	Helen Wainwright (USA)	6:46.8	QQ
2	Mariette Protin (FRA)	6:58.2	QQ
3	Vibeke Møller (DEN)	7:02.2	
4	Jane Gylling (SWE)	7:55.0	
5	Eva Chaloupková (TCH)	8:14.0	

Heat 4

Place	Swimmer	Time	Qual.
1	Gwitha Shand (NZL)	6:23.6	QQ
2	Iris Tanner (GBR)	6:35.4	QQ
3	Hjördis Töpel (SWE)	6:59.8	
4	Maria Vierdag (NED)	7:02.4	

=== Semifinals ===
Monday 14 July 1924: The fastest two in each semi-final and the faster of the two third-placed swimmer advanced to the final.

Semifinal 1

Place	Swimmer	Time	Qual.
1	Helen Wainwright (USA)	6:19.6	QF
2	Doris Molesworth (GBR)	6:19.8	QF
3	Gwitha Shand (NZL)	6:24.4	qf
4	Constance Jeans (GBR)	6:37.8	
5	Mariette Protin (FRA)	6:56.6	

Semifinal 2

Place	Swimmer	Time	Qual.
1	Gertrude Ederle (USA)	6:23.8	QF
2	Martha Norelius (USA)	6:26.6	QF
3	Iris Tanner (GBR)	6:34.0	
4	Hedevig Rasmussen (DEN)	6:55.2	

=== Final ===
Tuesday 15 July 1924:

Place	Swimmer	Time
1	Martha Norelius (USA)	6:02.2 OR
2	Helen Wainwright (USA)	6:03.8
3	Gertrude Ederle (USA)	6:04.8
4	Doris Molesworth (GBR)	6:25.4
—	Gwitha Shand (NZL)	DNF
