= Emy Machnow =

Swedish swimmer

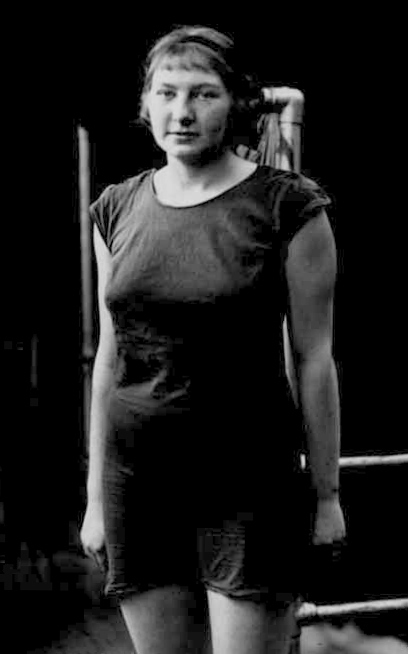

Personal information
- Born: 1 September 1897 Stockholm, Sweden
- Died: 23 November 1974 (aged 77) Malmö, Sweden

Sport
- Sport: Swimming
- Strokes: Freestyle
- Club: Malmö SS
Medal record
Representing Sweden
Olympic Games
Bronze medal – third place	1920 Antwerp	4×100 m freestyle relay

Emmy Gunilla "Emy" Machnow (1 September 1897 – 23 November 1974) was a Swedish freestyle swimmer. She won a bronze medal in 4 × 100 m freestyle relay at the 1920 Summer Olympics in Antwerp along with Aina Berg, Carin Nilsson and Jane Gylling.
