= Gladys Carson =

British swimmer (1903–1987)

Personal information
- Full name: Gladys Helena Carson
- National team: Great Britain
- Born: 8 February 1903 Leicester, England
- Died: 17 November 1987 (aged 84) Spilsby, England

Sport
- Sport: Swimming
- Strokes: Breaststroke
Medal record
Women's swimming
Representing Great Britain
Olympic Games
Bronze medal – third place	1924 Paris	200 m breaststroke

Gladys Helena Carson (8 February 1903 – 17 November 1987), later known by her married name Gladys Hewitt, was an English competitive swimmer who represented Great Britain at the 1924 Summer Olympics in Paris. She won a bronze medal for coming third in the event final of the women's 200-metre breaststroke in a time of 3:35.4, finishing behind fellow Briton Lucy Morton (3:32.2) and American Agnes Geraghty (3:34.0).

Carson was born in Leicester, England.

== See also ==
- List of Olympic medalists in swimming (women)
