= Topel =

Topel or Töpel may refer to:

- Topel Lee, Filipino film and music video director
- Bernard Joseph Topel (1903–1986), American prelate of the Roman Catholic Church
- Cengiz Topel (1934–1964), Turkish fighter pilot
  - Cengiz Topel Naval Air Station in Turkey
- Hjördis Töpel (1904–1987), Swedish freestyle swimmer and diver
- Ingegärd Töpel (1906–1988), Swedish freestyle swimmer and diver, sister of Hjördis
- Zehra Topel (born 1987), Turkish chess player
