= Odette Monard =

French swimmer

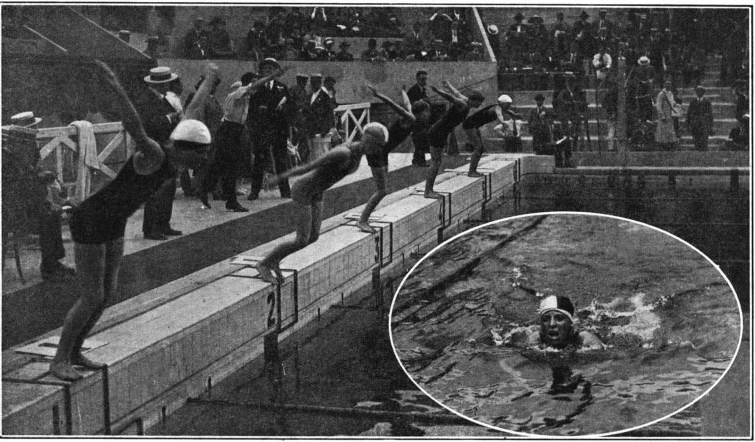
- From left to right (bottom to top): Agnes Geraghty (USA, 1st); Odette Monard (FRA, 4th); Irene Gilbert (GBR, 2nd); Wivan Pettersson (SWE, 3rd); Marie Baron (NED, disqualified). Insert: Marie Baron swimming.

Personal information
- Born: 5 August 1903
- Died: 14 January 1989 (aged 85)

Sport
- Sport: Swimming

Odette Monard (5 August 1903 – 14 January 1989) was a French swimmer. She competed in the women's 200 metre breaststroke event at the 1924 Summer Olympics.
