= Florence Barker =

Florence Barker may refer to:

- Florence Barker (swimmer) (1908–1986), British swimmer
- Florence Barker (actress) (1891–1913), American actress
