= Sancroft =

Sancroft is a surname. Notable people with the surname include:

- Florence Sancroft (1902–1978), English swimmer
- William Sancroft (1617–1693), English Anglican bishop
