= Monard =

Monard may refer to:

- Monard, County Cork, townland close to Cork city, Ireland
- Monard, County Tipperary, Ireland, a townland; see List of townlands of County Tipperary
- Albert Monard (1886–1952), zoologist from whom are named:
  - Monard's dormouse
  - Monard's African climbing mouse
- Jorge Monard, Ecuadorian boxer at the 1980 Olympics
- Odette Monard (1903–1989), French swimmer at the 1924 Olympics
