= Swimming at the 1924 Summer Olympics – Women's 200 metre breaststroke =

Women's 200 metre breaststroke at the Games of the VIII Olympiad
- Venue: Piscine des Tourelles
- Date: 16 July 1924 (semifinals); 18 July 1924 (final)
- Competitors: 15 from 8 nations
- Winning time: 3.33.2

Medalists
1st place, gold medalist(s)		Lucy Morton	Great Britain
2nd place, silver medalist(s)		Agnes Geraghty	United States
3rd place, bronze medalist(s)		Gladys Carson	Great Britain

The women's 200 metre breaststroke was a swimming event held as part of the swimming at the 1924 Summer Olympics programme. It was the first appearance of the event, as women only swam freestyle events before this Games. The competition was held on Wednesday July 16, 1924 and on Friday July 18, 1924.

== Records ==
These were the standing world and Olympic records (in minutes) prior to the 1924 Summer Olympics.

World record	3:20.4	(United Kingdom) Irene Gilbert	Rotherham (GBR)	June 18, 1923
Olympic record	-	none	-	-

In the first heat Agnes Geraghty set the first Olympic record with 3:27.6 minutes. This record was not bettered during this competition.

== Results ==
=== Semifinals ===
Wednesday July 16, 1924: The fastest two in each semi-final and the fastest third-placed from across the semi-finals advanced.

Semifinal 1

Mietje Baron was disqualified, because she touched the wall with only one hand.

Place	Swimmer	Time	Qual.
1	Agnes Geraghty (USA)	3:27.6	QF OR
2	Irene Gilbert (GBR)	3:32.8	QF
3	Wivan Pettersson (SWE)	3:37.0	qf
4	Odette Monard (FRA)	3:48.4	
—	Mietje Baron (NED)	(3:22.6)	DSQ

Semifinal 2

Place	Swimmer	Time	Qual.
1	Lucy Morton (GBR)	3:29.4	QF
2	Laure Koster (LUX)	3:35.0	QF
3	Eleanor Coleman (USA)	3:39.2	
4	Ella Molnár (HUN)	3:39.8	
5	Alice Stoffel (FRA)	3:48.0	

Semifinal 3

Place	Swimmer	Time	Qual.
1	Gladys Carson (GBR)	3:30.0	QF
2	Hjördis Töpel (SWE)	3:39.0	QF
3	Matilda Scheurich (USA)	3:41.2	
4	Běla Drážková (TCH)	3:43.0	
5	Suzanne Kiffer-Porte (FRA)	3:43.6	

=== Final ===
Friday July 18, 1924:

Place	Swimmer	Time
1	Lucy Morton (GBR)	3:33.2
2	Agnes Geraghty (USA)	3:34.0
3	Gladys Carson (GBR)	3:35.4
4	Wivan Pettersson (SWE)	3:37.6
5	Irene Gilbert (GBR)	3:38.0
6	Laure Koster (LUX)	3:39.2
7	Hjördis Töpel (SWE)	3:47.6
