= Babeta Dražková =

Czech swimmer

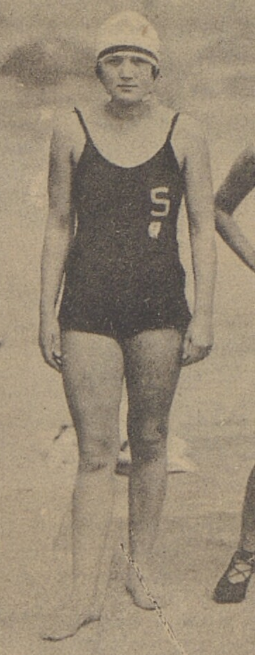
- Dražková in 1922

Personal information
- Nicknames: Babeta, Běta (Note: This nickname often appears with a typo, which is why she sometimes appears under the name Běla Dražková.)
- Nationality: Czech
- Born: Alžběta Dražková; 25 May 1905 Prague, Bohemia, Austria-Hungary
- Died: 12 October 1988 (aged 83)

Sport
- Sport: Swimming

Alžběta "Babeta" Dražková (Note: Incorrectly Drážková, as it sometimes appears) (married Vacínová; 25 May 1905 – 12 October 1988) was a Czech swimmer. She competed in the women's 200 metre breaststroke event at the 1924 Summer Olympics.

== Life ==
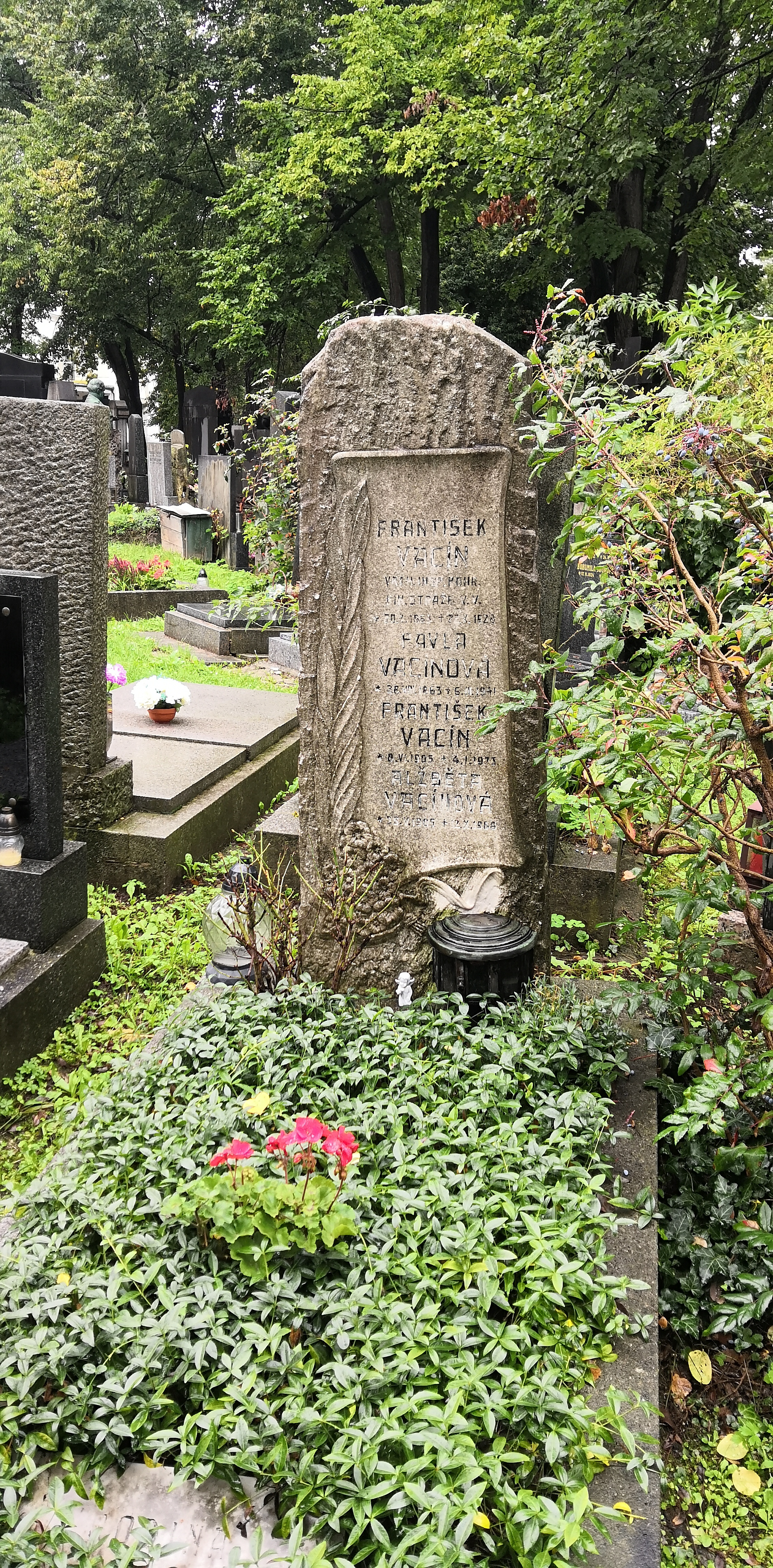
Grave of Dražková at Olšany Cemetery (Note: Listed as Alžběta Vacínová; her name is at the very bottom.)

She was born on 25 May 1905 in Prague. She married water polo player František Vacín in 1932.
