= Ella Molnár =

Hungarian swimmer

Personal information
- Born: 14 March 1906
- Died: 9 December 1990 (aged 84)

Sport
- Sport: Swimming

Ella Molnár (14 March 1906 – 9 December 1990) was a Hungarian swimmer. She competed in the women's 200 metre breaststroke event at the 1924 Summer Olympics.
