= Laure Koster =

Luxembourgish swimmer (1902–1999)

Personal information
- Born: 23 April 1902 Luxembourg City, Luxembourg
- Died: 22 October 1999 (aged 97) Luxembourg City, Luxembourg

Sport
- Sport: Swimming

Laure Koster (23 April 1902 – 22 October 1999) was a Luxembourgish swimmer. She competed in the women's 200 metre breaststroke event at the 1924 Summer Olympics. She was the first woman to represent Luxembourg at the Olympics.
