= Carin Nilsson =

Swedish swimmer

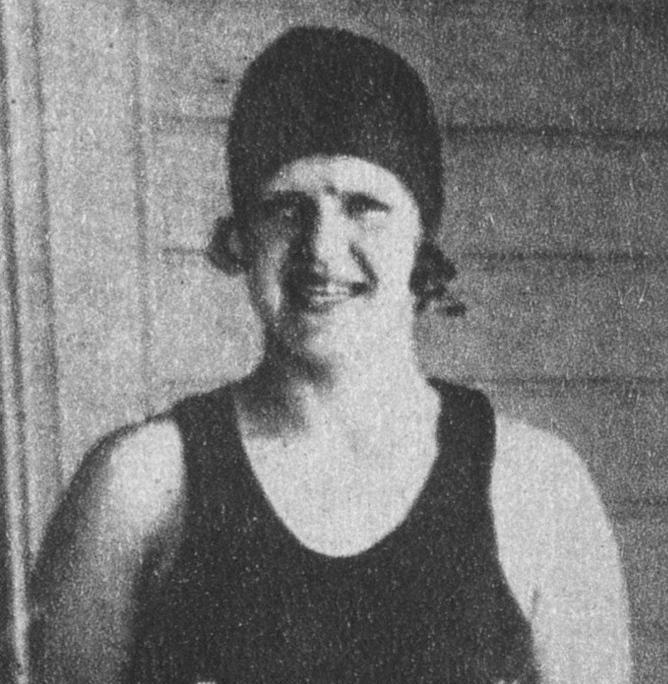

Personal information
- Born: 10 December 1904 Stockholm, Sweden
- Died: 20 December 1999 (aged 95) Branchville, New Jersey, United States

Sport
- Sport: Swimming
- Strokes: Freestyle
- Club: Stockholms KK
Medal record
Representing Sweden
Olympic Games
Bronze medal – third place	1920 Antwerp	4×100 m freestyle relay

Carin Maria Nilsson (later Lommerin, 10 December 1904 – 20 December 1999) was a Swedish freestyle swimmer. Aged 15 she won a bronze medal in 4 × 100 m freestyle relay at the 1920 Summer Olympics in Antwerp along with Aina Berg, Emily Machnow and Jane Gylling.
