= Hjördis Töpel =

Swedish swimmer

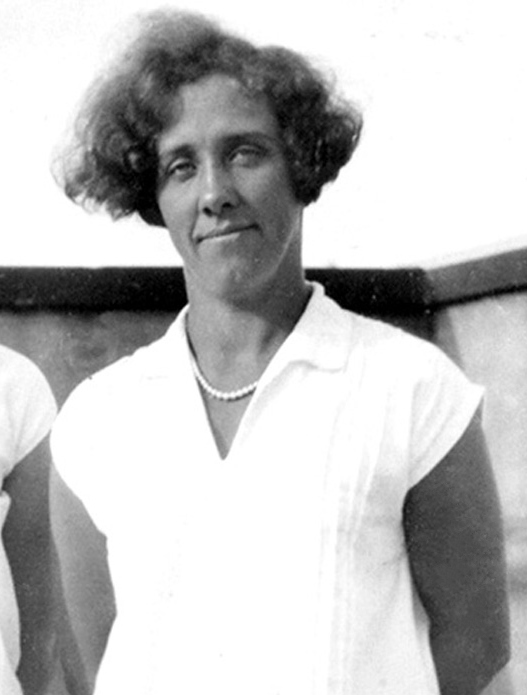

Personal information
- Born: 4 January 1904 Gothenburg, Sweden
- Died: 17 March 1987 (aged 83) Gothenburg, Sweden

Sport
- Sport: Swimming, Diving
- Club: SK Najaden, Göteborg
Medal record
Representing Sweden
Olympic Games
Swimming
Bronze medal – third place	1924 Paris	4×100m freestyle relay
Diving
Bronze medal – third place	1924 Paris	10 metre platform

Hjördis Viktoria Töpel (4 January 1904 (Note: Other sources report her date of birth as 5 January 1904.) – 17 March 1987) was a Swedish freestyle swimmer and diver who competed at the 1924 Summer Olympics in Paris and the 1928 Summer Olympics in Amsterdam.

She competed in both diving and swimming at the 1924 Olympics. In swimming she entered the 200m breaststroke, the 100m and 400m freestyle events and the 4×100m freestyle relay. Her team won bronze in the relay and she finished seventh in the breaststroke. She also won an individual bronze medal in the 10m platform event.

Remarkably, there were two female athletes at the 1924 Olympics who won medals in both diving and swimming. Hjördis Töpel and American Aileen Riggin both won diving and swimming medals, making them the first two female athletes to win medals in two different sports at a single Olympic games. (Note: Most sources claim Aileen Riggin to be the only female in Olympic history to win medals in both swimming and diving at a single Olympic Games, but the medal tables show that this is not true. The distinction may be in the fact that Töpel's swimming medal was for a team event so she did not in fact win two "individual" medals.)

In 1928 Töpel only competed in diving, alongside her younger sister Ingegärd. They both took part in the 10m platform event but neither of them advanced into the final round.

== Early life ==
Hjördis was born in Göteborg, Västra Götaland, Sweden on 4 January 1904 to parents Viktor Emanuel, a typographer and book printer, and Matilda Josefina Töpel. She had six brothers and two sisters: Yngve Gotthard Töpel, Frans Josef Töpel, Karin Helena Töpel, Erland Viktor Töpel, Olof Valdemar Töpel, Gilbert Reimond Töpel, Björn Fritiof Töpel, and most notably fellow Olympian Ingegärd Töpel. She was educated in Folkskola, Göteborg.

== Career ==
Hjördis Töpel, a notable Swedish athlete, was a member of Gothenburg's SK Najaden sports club, which was established in 1917. During the lead-up to the 1920 Antwerp Olympics, Sweden held qualifying competitions in Stockholm that also doubled as national championships. SK Najaden sent several female athletes to these trials, some of whom secured spots on the Olympic team. Unfortunately, Töpel was named a reserve and did not travel to Belgium.

In 1922, the first "regular women’s Olympiad" began with swimming events held in Monte Carlo. Representing Svenska Simförbundet, Töpel was among five Swedish competitors. She placed second in the plain diving event behind Eva Olliwier and was part of the Swedish team that won the freestyle relay.

Töpel competed in the 1924 Paris Olympics, earning a bronze medal in the plain diving event. She closely contested with the event favorite, an American diver. She also contributed to Sweden’s bronze medal victory in the 4x100 meter freestyle relay, alongside Aina Berg, Wivan Pettersson, and Gulli Ewerlund. At the 1928 Amsterdam Olympics, Töpel and her younger sister, Ingegärd Töpel, also an SK Najaden member, competed in the plain diving event but were eliminated in the first heat.

Throughout her career, Töpel claimed numerous national swimming titles, demonstrating her versatility. She was the Swedish champion in the 100-meter freestyle in 1923, 1924, and 1930; the 200-meter breaststroke in 1923; and the lifeguard event in 1923 and 1924. She dominated the 1923 Nordic Championships, winning the 100-meter freestyle, the 200-meter breaststroke, and the high dive. In 1925, she won the Nordic high dive title. Töpel set Swedish records in the 100-meter freestyle (1923), 400-meter freestyle (1930), and 200-meter breaststroke (1923).

At the 1923 Swedish Games in Gothenburg, Töpel won both the 100-meter and 300-meter freestyle events and led her team to victory in the 4x100-meter relay with a decisive final leg. In 1924, she triumphed in the first-ever Älvsborgsimningen, a 2,000-meter open-water swim, completing it in 44:30.50. Her competitive streak extended well into the 1930s, with a regional championship diving title in 1935 and a team win in the 4x100 meter relay in 1936 with SK Najaden.

== Later life ==
After her Olympic career, Hjördis retired as an office worker and died in Gothenburg on 17 March 1987 (aged 83). She is buried at the Västra cemetery in the same city.
