= Swimming at the 1920 Summer Olympics – Women's 4 × 100 metre freestyle relay =

Women's 4 × 100 metre freestyle relay at the Games of the VII Olympiad
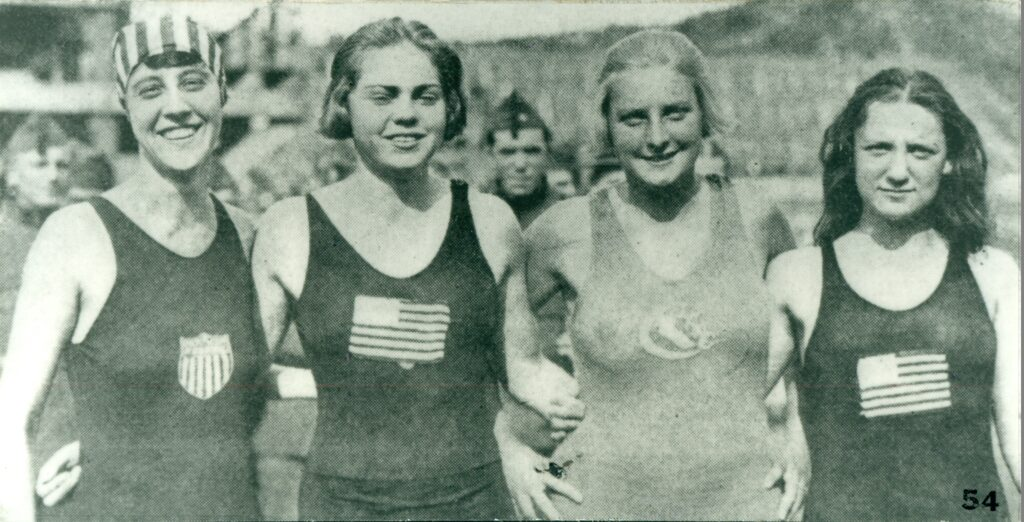
- The U.S. relay team
- Venue: Stade Nautique d'Antwerp
- Date: 29 August 1920
- Competitors: 12 from 3 nations
- Teams: 3
- Winning time: 5:11.6 WR

Medalists
1st place, gold medalist(s)		Ethelda Bleibtrey, Irene Guest, Frances Schroth, Margaret Woodbridge; United States
2nd place, silver medalist(s)		Hilda James, Constance Jeans, Grace McKenzie, Charlotte Radcliffe; Great Britain
3rd place, bronze medalist(s)		Aina Berg, Jane Gylling, Emily Machnow, Carin Nilsson; Sweden

The women's 4 × 100 metre freestyle relay was a swimming event held as part of the swimming at the 1920 Summer Olympics programme. It was the second appearance of the event.

A total of twelve swimmers, representing three teams from three nations, competed in the event, which was held on Sunday, August 29, 1920. The United States women, who had already swept all six medals in the 100 metre and 300 metre event, won easily, setting a new world record. Ethelda Bleibtrey won her third gold medal.

== Records ==
These were the standing world and Olympic records (in minutes) prior to the 1920 Summer Olympics.

World record	5:52.8	(United Kingdom) Belle Moore (United Kingdom) Jennie Fletcher (United Kingdom) Annie Speirs (United Kingdom) Irene Steer	Stockholm (SWE)	July 15, 1912
Olympic record	5:52.8	(United Kingdom) Belle Moore (United Kingdom) Jennie Fletcher (United Kingdom) Annie Speirs (United Kingdom) Irene Steer	Stockholm (SWE)	July 15, 1912

The United States set a new world record.

== Results ==
=== Final ===
Place	Swimmers	Time
1	Margaret Woodbridge, Frances Schroth, Irene Guest, and Ethelda Bleibtrey (USA)	5:11.6 WR
2	Hilda James, Constance Jeans, Charlotte Radcliffe, and Grace McKenzie (GBR)	5:40.8
3	Aina Berg, Emily Machnow, Carin Nilsson, and Jane Gylling (SWE)	5:43.6
