= Hedevig Rasmussen =

Danish swimmer (1902–1985)

Personal information
- Born: April 21, 1902 Copenhagen, Denmark
- Died: April 15, 1985 (aged 82) Lundtofte, Denmark

Sport
- Sport: Swimming

Hedevig Rasmussen (later Gjørling, later Jensen, 21 April 1902 – 15 April 1985) was a Danish freestyle swimmer who competed in the 1924 Summer Olympics. She was born in Copenhagen and died in Lundtofte, Hovedstaden.

In 1924 she was a member of the Danish relay team which finished fourth in the 4×100 metre freestyle relay competition. In the 400 metre freestyle event she was eliminated in the semi-finals and in the 100 metre freestyle event she was eliminated in the first round.
