= Irene Gilbert (swimmer) =

British swimmer

Personal information
- Born: 22 January 1903 Sheffield, England
- Died: October 1988 Sheffield, England

Sport
- Sport: Swimming

Irene Gilbert (22 January 1903 – October 1988) was a British swimmer. She competed in the women's 200 metre breaststroke event at the 1924 Summer Olympics.
