= Matilda Scheurich =

American swimmer

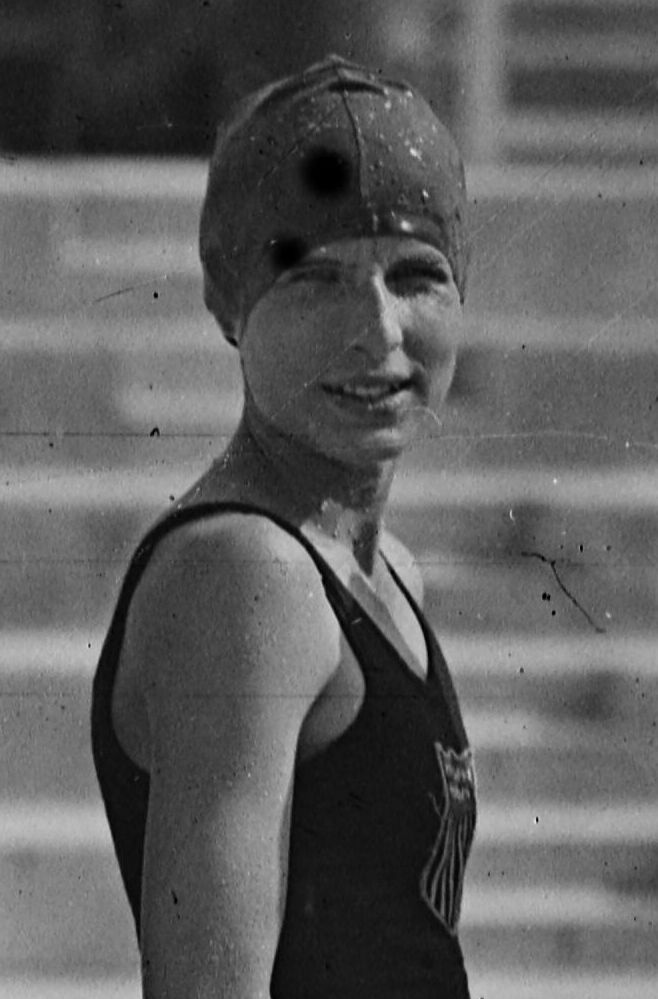
- Scheurich in 1924

Personal information
- Born: July 11, 1910 New York City, United States
- Died: July 1983 New York City, United States

Sport
- Sport: Swimming

Matilda Scheurich (July 11, 1910 – July 1983) was an American swimmer. She competed in the women's 200 metre breaststroke event at the 1924 Summer Olympics.
