= Mariette Protin =

French swimmer

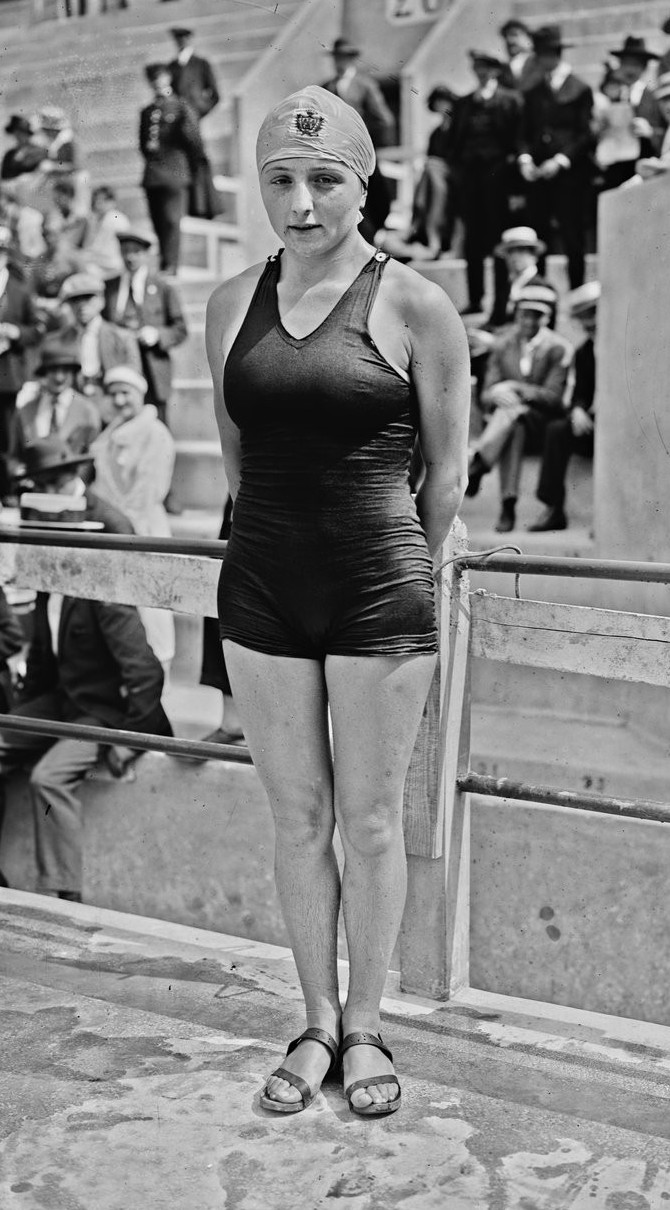
- Mariette Protin in 1924 at Piscine des Tourelles

Personal information
- Born: April 16, 1906 Paris, France
- Died: July 2, 1993 (aged 87) Nice, France

Sport
- Sport: Swimming

Mariette Protin (16 April 1906 – 2 July 1993) was a French freestyle swimmer who competed in the 1924 Summer Olympics.

In 1924 she was a member of the French relay team which finished fifth in the 4 x 100 metre freestyle relay competition. She also participated in the 100 metre freestyle event and in the 400 metre freestyle competition but in both she was eliminated in the semi-finals.
