= Alida Bolten =

Dutch swimmer (1903–1984)

Personal information
- Born: October 20, 1903 Amsterdam, Netherlands
- Died: January 29, 1984 (aged 80) Amsterdam, Netherlands

Sport
- Sport: Swimming

Alida "Ada" Cornelia Bolten (20 October 1903 – 29 January 1984) was a Dutch freestyle swimmer who competed in the 1924 Summer Olympics. She was born and died in Amsterdam. She was the sister of Wim Bolten. In 1924 she was a member of the Dutch relay team which finished sixth in the 4 × 100 metre freestyle relay competition.
