= Karen Maud Rasmussen =

Danish swimmer

Personal information
- Born: 27 June 1906 Copenhagen, Denmark
- Died: 5 September 1994 (aged 88) Copenhagen, Denmark

Sport
- Sport: Swimming

Karen Maud Rasmussen (later Pedersen, 27 June 1906 – 5 September 1994) was a Danish freestyle swimmer who competed in the 1924 Summer Olympics. She was born and died in Copenhagen. In 1924 she was a member of the Danish relay team which finished fourth in the 4×100 metre freestyle relay competition. In the 100 metre freestyle event she was eliminated in the first round.
