= Ethel Lackie =

American swimmer (1907–1979)

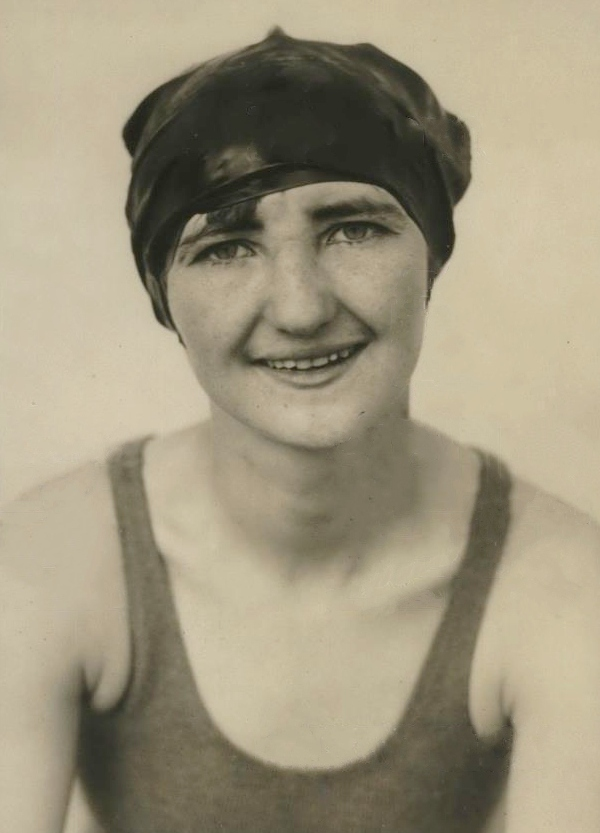
- Lackie in 1929

Personal information
- Full name: Ethel Minnie Lackie
- National team: United States
- Born: February 10, 1907 Chicago, Illinois, U.S.
- Died: December 15, 1979 (aged 72) Newbury Park, California, U.S.
- Height: 5 ft 4 in (1.63 m)

Sport
- Sport: Swimming
- Strokes: Freestyle
- Club: Illinois Athletic Club
- Coach: Bill Bachrach (Illinois AC)
Medal record
Representing the United States
Olympic Games
| Gold medal – first place | 1924 Paris | 100 m freestyle |
| Gold medal – first place | 1924 Paris | 4×100 m freestyle |

Ethel Minnie Lackie (February 10, 1907 – December 15, 1979), also known by her married name Ethel Watkins, was an American competition swimmer, Olympic champion, and world record-holder.

Lackie was born in Chicago, Illinois on February 10, 1907, to Mr. and Mrs. Lester E. Lackie, a highly competent swimmer who insisted that his daughter Ethel begin swimming by the age of three. She attended high school at University High in the Hyde Park community of Chicago. Ethel represented the Illinois Athletic Club in competition, under Hall of Fame Coach Bill Bachrach and was the first woman to break 60 seconds for the 100y freestyle and the first to clock 1:10.0 for the 100m freestyle. Bachrach coached many swimming legends. Among those who also won medals in the 1924 Paris Olympics were Johnny Weissmuller of Tarzan movie fame, Bob Skelton, Arne Borg, and Sybil Bauer.

Lackie set several American and world records. As referenced in the following section, Lackie set a world record of 1:10.0 for the 100-meter freestyle on 28 January 1926, that held until August 7, 1929. The combined time of 4:58.8 for swimming on the gold medal 4×100 m freestyle relay team at the 1924 Paris Olympics was set on July 20, 1924 and held until August 9, 1928.

== 1924 Olympics ==
Lackie represented the United States at the 1924 Summer Olympics in Paris. Individually, she won a gold medal in the women's 100-meter freestyle, finishing with an Olympic record time of 1:12.4, and leading an American medal sweep of the event. She also won a second gold medal as a member of the first-place U.S. team in the women's 4×100-meter freestyle relay, together with American teammates Euphrasia Donnelly, Gertrude Ederle and Mariechen Wehselau. The U.S. relay team set a new world record of 4:58.8 in the event final. Louis Handley was the women's Olympic head coach that year, but her coach at the Illinois Athletic Club, Bill Bachrach, was the men's Olympic head coach.

After retiring from competitions she married Bill Watkins, a rower from the Santa Monica area. Ethel noted in her Hall of Fame acceptance speech that her husband grew up swimming off the beaches of Santa Monica, served summers in college as a lifeguard, held records in paddle-boarding events, and captured championships in dory rowing.

She died in Newbury Park, California on December 15, 1979.

=== Honors ===
In 1969, she became an honor member of the International Swimming Hall of Fame.

== See also ==
- List of members of the International Swimming Hall of Fame
- List of Olympic medalists in swimming (women)
- World record progression 100 metres freestyle
- World record progression 4 × 100 metres freestyle relay

Records
| Preceded by Mariechen Wehselau | Women's 100-meter freestyle world record-holder (long course); January 28, 1926 – August 7, 1929 | Succeeded by Eleanor Garatti |
