= Gilberte Mortier =

French swimmer

Personal information
- Born: March 12, 1907 Paris, France
- Died: January 18, 1991 (aged 83) Vielle-Saint-Girons, France

Sport
- Sport: Swimming

Gilberte Mortier (12 March 1907 – 18 January 1991) was a French freestyle swimmer. Mortier competed in the 1924 Summer Olympics. In 1924, she was a member of the French relay team which finished fifth in the 4 x 100 metre freestyle relay competition. In the 400 metre freestyle event, she was eliminated in the first round.
