= Lillian Birkenhead =

British swimmer

Personal information
- Born: 19 January 1905 Garston, Liverpool, England
- Died: 4 February 1979 (aged 74) Liverpool, England

Sport
- Sport: Swimming

Lillian Birkenhead (19 January 1905 – 4 February 1979) was a British swimmer. She competed in the women's 100 metre freestyle event at the 1920 Summer Olympics.
