= Charlotte Radcliffe =

British swimmer (1903–1979)

Personal information
- Full name: Charlotte Ellen Radcliffe
- National team: Great Britain
- Born: 3 August 1903 Liverpool, England
- Died: 12 December 1979 (aged 76) Liverpool, England

Sport
- Sport: Swimming
- Strokes: Freestyle
Medal record
Women's swimming
Representing Great Britain
Olympic Games
Silver medal – second place	1920 Antwerp	4×100 m freestyle relay

Charlotte Ellen Radcliffe (3 August 1903 – 12 December 1979) was an English competitive swimmer from Liverpool who competed for Great Britain in the 1920 Summer Olympics.

In the 1920 Olympics in Antwerp, Belgium, at age 17, she won a silver medal in the 4×100-metre freestyle relay, in which she swam the third leg of the race. She finished seventh in her first heat of 100-metre freestyle event and did not advance.

She is the grand-aunt of long-distance runner Paula Radcliffe.

== See also ==
- List of Olympic medalists in swimming (women)
