= Blanche Nash =

South African swimmer (1902–1964)

Blanche Emily Maynard Nash
Personal information
- Born: 30 July 1902 Cape Town, Cape Colony
- Died: 19 June 1964 (aged 61) Cape Town, South Africa

Sport
- Sport: Swimming

Blanche Nash (30 July 1902 – 19 June 1964) was a South African swimmer who was a national record holder in the 50 yards. She competed in the women's 100 metre freestyle and women's 300 metre freestyle events at the 1920 Summer Olympics. She was the first woman to represent South Africa at the Olympics.
