= Ernestine Lebrun =

French swimmer

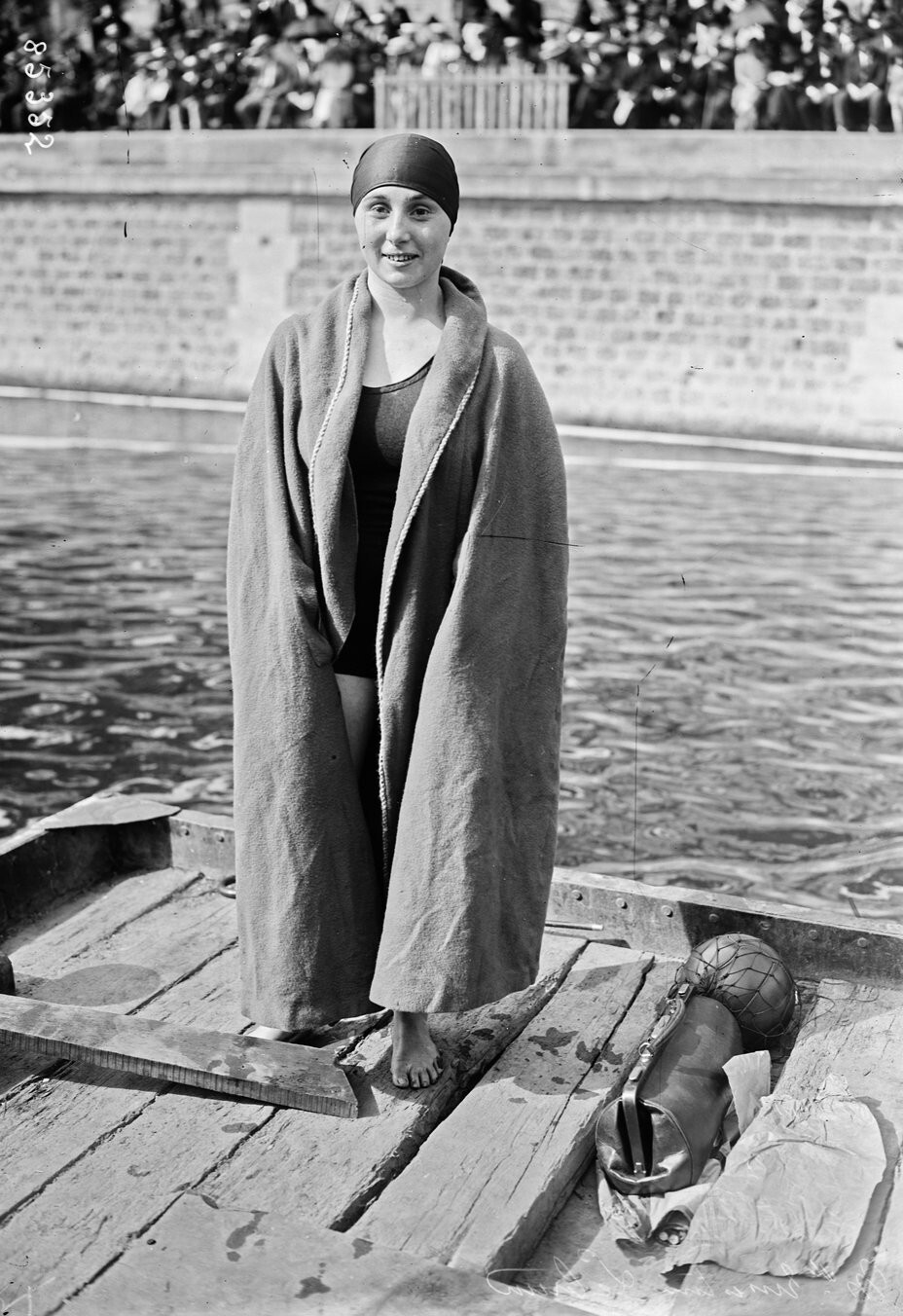
- Ernestine Lebrun in 1923

Personal information
- Born: February 25, 1906 Tourcoing, France
- Died: May 6, 2005 (aged 99) Allauch, France

Sport
- Sport: Swimming

Ernestine Lebrun (25 February 1906 – 6 May 2005) was a French freestyle swimmer who competed in the 1920 Summer Olympics and in the 1924 Summer Olympics.

In 1920 she was eliminated in the first round of the 100 metre freestyle event as well as in the first round of the 300 metre freestyle competition. Four years later, at the Paris Games, she was a member of the French relay team, which finished fifth in the 4 × 100 metre freestyle relay competition. She also participated in the 100 metre freestyle event and in the 400 metre freestyle competition, but in both, she was eliminated in the first round. At the French swimming championships in 1923 and 1925, Lebrun won the same three events: 100 metre freestyle, 400 metre freestyle, and 1000 metre freestyle.
