= Mariechen Wehselau =

American swimmer

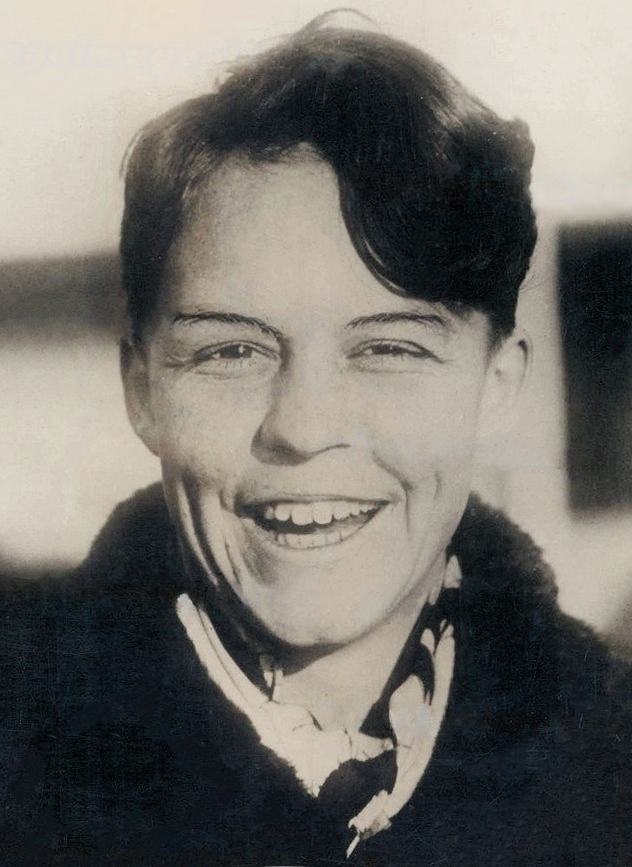
- Wehselau in 1926

Personal information
- Full name: Mariechen M. Wehselau
- National team: United States
- Born: May 15, 1906 Honolulu, Territory of Hawaii, U.S.
- Died: July 12, 1992 (aged 86) Honolulu, Hawaii, U.S.

Sport
- Sport: Swimming
- Strokes: Freestyle
- Club: Outrigger Canoe Club
- Coach: Dad Center
Medal record
Representing the United States
Olympic Games
Gold medal – first place	1924 Paris	4×100 m freestyle
Silver medal – second place	1924 Paris	100 m freestyle

Mariechen M. Wehselau (May 15, 1906 – July 12, 1992), also known by her married name Mariechen Jackson, was an American competition swimmer, Olympic champion, and world record-holder.

Wehselau represented the United States at the 1924 Summer Olympics in Paris. She won a gold medal as a member of the winning U.S. team in the 4×100-meter freestyle relay, together with American teammates Euphrasia Donnelly, Gertrude Ederle and Ethel Lackie. The U.S. relay team set a new world record of 4:58.8 in the event final. Individually, she also received a silver medal for her second-place performance in the 100-meter freestyle, finishing with a time of 1:12.8, immediately behind American teammate Ethel Lackie.

After the Games Wehselau was invited by the Australian Swimming Association to compete in local championships and perform in exhibitions. She then returned to Hawaii, where from 1928 to 1937 she trained swimmers together with her past coach Dad Center. In 1989 she was inducted into the International Swimming Hall of Fame as an "Honor Pioneer Swimmer". She died in Honolulu, Hawaii in 1992.

== See also ==
- List of members of the International Swimming Hall of Fame
- List of Olympic medalists in swimming (women)
- World record progression 100 metres freestyle
- World record progression 4 × 100 metres freestyle relay

Records
Preceded by Gertrude Ederle	Women's 100-meter freestyle world record-holder (long course); July 19, 1924 – January 28, 1926	Succeeded by Ethel Lackie
