= Euphrasia Donnelly =

American swimmer (1905–1963)

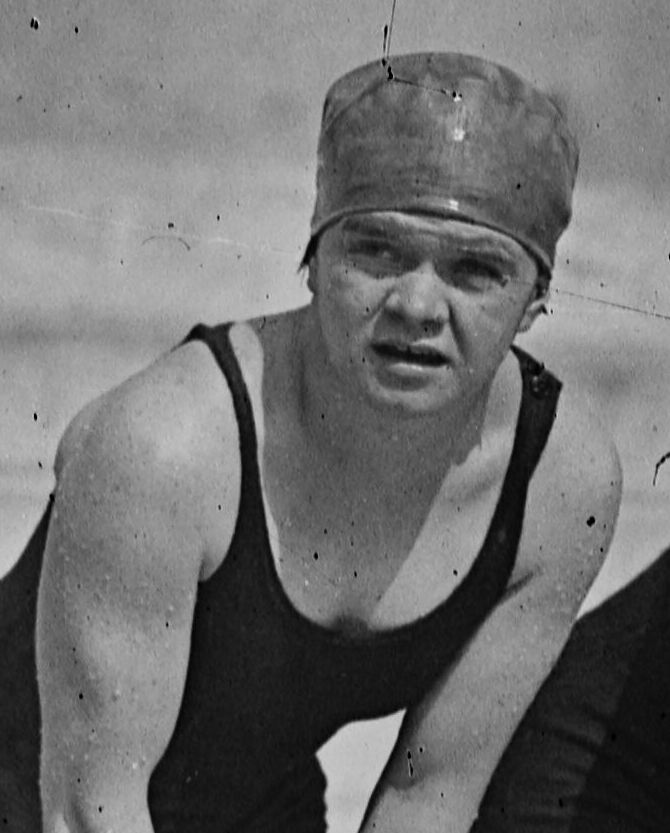
- Donnelly in 1924

Personal information
- Full name: Euphrasia Louise Donnelly
- Nickname: "Fraze"
- National team: United States
- Born: June 6, 1905 Indianapolis, Indiana, U.S.
- Died: May 20, 1963 (aged 57) Warsaw, Indiana, U.S.
- Occupations: Professional swimmer Swim instructor, swimming careers X-Ray and lab tech
- Height: 5 ft 4 in (1.63 m)
- Spouses: Bruce Raymond Bungard (1934); Richard L. Berlin (1957)

Sport
- Sport: Swimming
- Strokes: Freestyle
- Club: Hoosier Athletic Club
- Coach: William S. Merriam (Hoosier Athletic); Louis De B. Handley ('24 Olympics)
Medal record
Women's swimming
Representing the United States
Olympic Games
Gold medal – first place	1924 Paris	4×100 m freestyle relay

Euphrasia Louise "Fraze" Donnelly (June 6, 1905 – May 20, 1963), also known by her married names Euphrasia Donnelly Bungard, and later Euphrasia Bungard Berlin, was an American competition swimmer, Olympic champion in the 4x100-meter freestyle relay, and former world record-holder. She would later swim professionally, marry twice, serve as an instructor with Saint Mary-of-the-Woods College, hold a variety of swimming-related jobs, and work for a period as an X-ray and lab technician in Warsaw, Indiana.

== Early life ==
Donnelly was born on June 6, 1905, in Indianapolis to Maurice Donnelly, of Irish descent, and Sarah Jane McCarthy. She was one of seven children: Maurice, Eileen, Mary, Cecile, Virginia, and Crawford. Fraze, as she was called by her family and friends, was known for her athleticism and quick sense of humor. Donnelly attended Technical High School in Indianapolis, and began training and competing in races by the age of ten with the Hoosier Athletic Club in her hometown of Indianapolis, where she remained through most of her swimming career prior to the Olympics. One of her earliest and most influential coaches was Indianapolis's William S. Merriam, who coached her with the Hoosier Athletic Club. He would later coach swimming and water polo at the University of Pennsylvania from 1927 to 1943. His coaching career included stints with the Indianapolis Athletic Club, and Indiana University, in addition to the Hoosier Athletic Club. At a Hoosier Athletic Club meet on November 3, 1923, Donnelly set a 100-yard freestyle AAU Indiana State record of 1:09.2, breaking the old record by a full second. During her swimming career, Donnelly held Indiana State records in the 50, 100, and 220-yard freestyle events. In addition to her highly competitive times in swimming events in Indiana and Kentucky, Donnelly also excelled in several diving competitions.

== 1924 Paris Olympic gold ==
Donnelly secured her place on the 1924 U.S. women's team by placing third in the 100-meter freestyle at the June 7–8, 1924 Olympic trials at Briarcliff Lodge, just North of New York City. The U.S. team later sailed to Paris aboard the S.S. America, where the U.S. Olympic Women's swim team was favored to win the individual freestyle events, as well as Donnelly's 4x100 freestyle relay event.

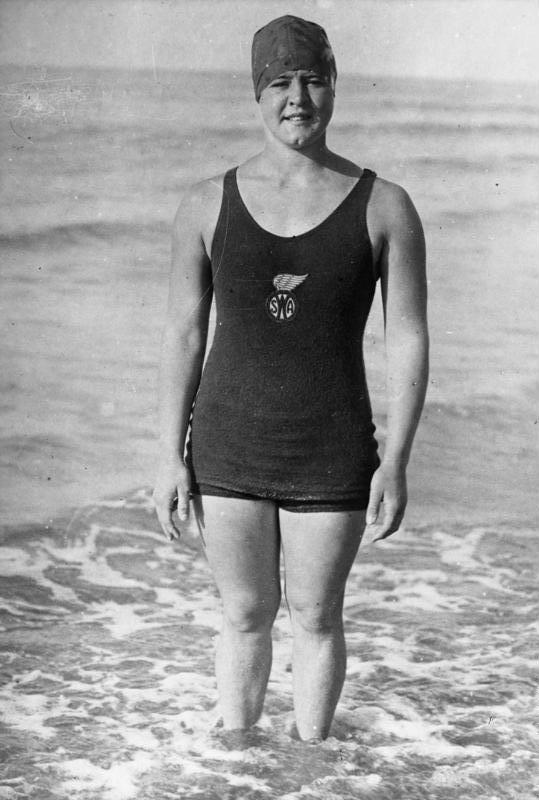
Gertrude Ederle, 1926

Donnelly represented the United States at the 1924 Summer Olympics on July 18 in Paris, where she won a gold medal as a member of the winning U.S. Women's team in the finals of the women's 4×100-meter freestyle relay. Donnelly, who swam the first 100-metre leg of the relay, and her American teammates Gertrude Ederle, famed for later swimming the English Channel, Ethel Lackie of the Illinois Athletic Club and Mariechen Wehselau set a new world record in the event final of 4:58.8, defeating the second-place silver medal team from Great Britain by close to a twenty-second margin. Donnely's women's 4x100 freestyle relay team's combined time was also a new Olympic record by a thirteen-second margin, the first Olympic time under five minutes for the event, and held as a world record for four years. In a finish that would not be considered close by modern standards, the British Women's 4x100 team that swam a 5:17.0, placed a full 18 seconds ahead of the Swedish team that took the bronze medal with a time of 5:35.6. Though all three of Euphrasia's 4x100 meter freestyle teammates won individual medals, Euphrasia competed exclusively as part of the 4x100 team relay, and did not enter an individual event. The 1924 U.S. Women's Olympic swimming team Head Coach was Louis De B. Handley, who coached New York's Women's Swimming Association founded and managed by Charlotte Epstein. Handley provided some pre-Olympic tips and training to Donnelly as part of her preparation for the Women's Olympic team.

Donnelly's U.S. 1924 Olympic teammates and travelling companions included three-time 1924 freestyle Olympic gold medalist, and future film star Johnny Weismuller, and 1924 Olympic silver medalist, Hawaiian Duke Kahanamoku of Honolulu. Also travelling with Donnelly and attending the 1924 Olympics was 1920 Antwerp rowing gold medalist Jack Kelly Sr., father of actress Grace Kelly. As part of her Olympic experience, Donelly met the Prince of Wales, actors Mary Pickford and Douglas Fairbanks, and after Olympic competition, the U.S. team performed for Belgium's Queen Elizabeth and King Albert I. Donnelly was chosen to compete in a 100-meter freestyle event as part of the Irish Tailteann Games in Dublin, Ireland, in August, 1924, which she won. The 1924 games were a revival of a much older traditional Irish sporting event dating back to 632 B.C.

Though known for her achievement of an Olympic gold medal in 1924, and her state titles in swimming events, Donnelly did not win a medal or title on the National level as part of American Athletic Union (AAU) competition during her swimming career.

== Post-Olympic life and careers ==
By 1925, Donnelly swam in a few professional meets. In her early post-Olympic career, she won a 9-mile professional distance swim in Toledo, Ohio, and took home $250 for her first-place finish. A few years after the Olympics, she worked as an instructor at Saint Mary-of-the-Woods College, a private Catholic liberal arts college in the greater Terre Haute area in West Central Indiana, about 80 miles Southeast of her native Indianapolis. During her time with Saint Mary-of-the-Woods, she taught swimming for six years. She subsequently filled a number of other swimming-related jobs, and worked as an instructor for the Riviera Club in Indianapolis in 1936. With her engagement announced in May 1931, on November 1, 1934, she married Bruce Raymond Bungard of Terre Haute, a fireman who died in 1952. In the 1940s and 50s she lived with husband Bruce Bungard in Indiana's Little Chapman Lake area, and enjoyed bowling to retain her fitness. She worked for a period as a lab and X-ray tech at the Murphy Medical Center in Warsaw, Indiana. In 1957, she married Richard L. Berlin, five years after the death of her former husband Bruce Ray Bungard.

Donnelly died at the Murphy Medical Center at the age of 57 on May 20, 1963, in greater Warsaw, Indiana, after being admitted on April 22, and had been in failing health for about a year. She began living in Warsaw around 1944, where she had been a member of the Sacred Heart Catholic Church and Tri Kappa, a service sorority, involved primarily in charity and fund-raising for non-profit organizations. Services were held for Donnelly on the morning of May 23 at the Sacred Heart Catholic Church, and she was later buried at Warsaw's Oakwood Cemetery.

== See also ==
- List of Olympic medalists in swimming (women)
- World record progression 4 × 100 metres freestyle relay
