= Doris Molesworth =

British swimmer

Personal information
- Born: 30 April 1902 Aston Manor, West Midlands, England
- Died: 26 June 1976 (aged 74) Birmingham, England

Sport
- Sport: Swimming

Doris Molesworth (30 April 1902 – 26 June 1976) was a British swimmer. She competed in the women's 400 metre freestyle event at the 1924 Summer Olympics.
