= Vibeke Møller =

Danish freestyle swimmer (1904–1987)

Personal information
- Born: November 21, 1904 Gentofte, Denmark
- Died: August 7, 1987 (aged 82)

Sport
- Sport: Swimming

Vibeke Merete Wulff Møller (later Boisen, 21 November 1904 – 7 August 1987) was a Danish freestyle swimmer who competed in the 1924 Summer Olympics. She was born in Gentofte. In 1924 she was a member of the Danish relay team which finished fourth in the 4×100 metre freestyle relay competition. In the 400 metre freestyle event she was eliminated in the first round.
