= Eleanor Uhl =

American swimmer

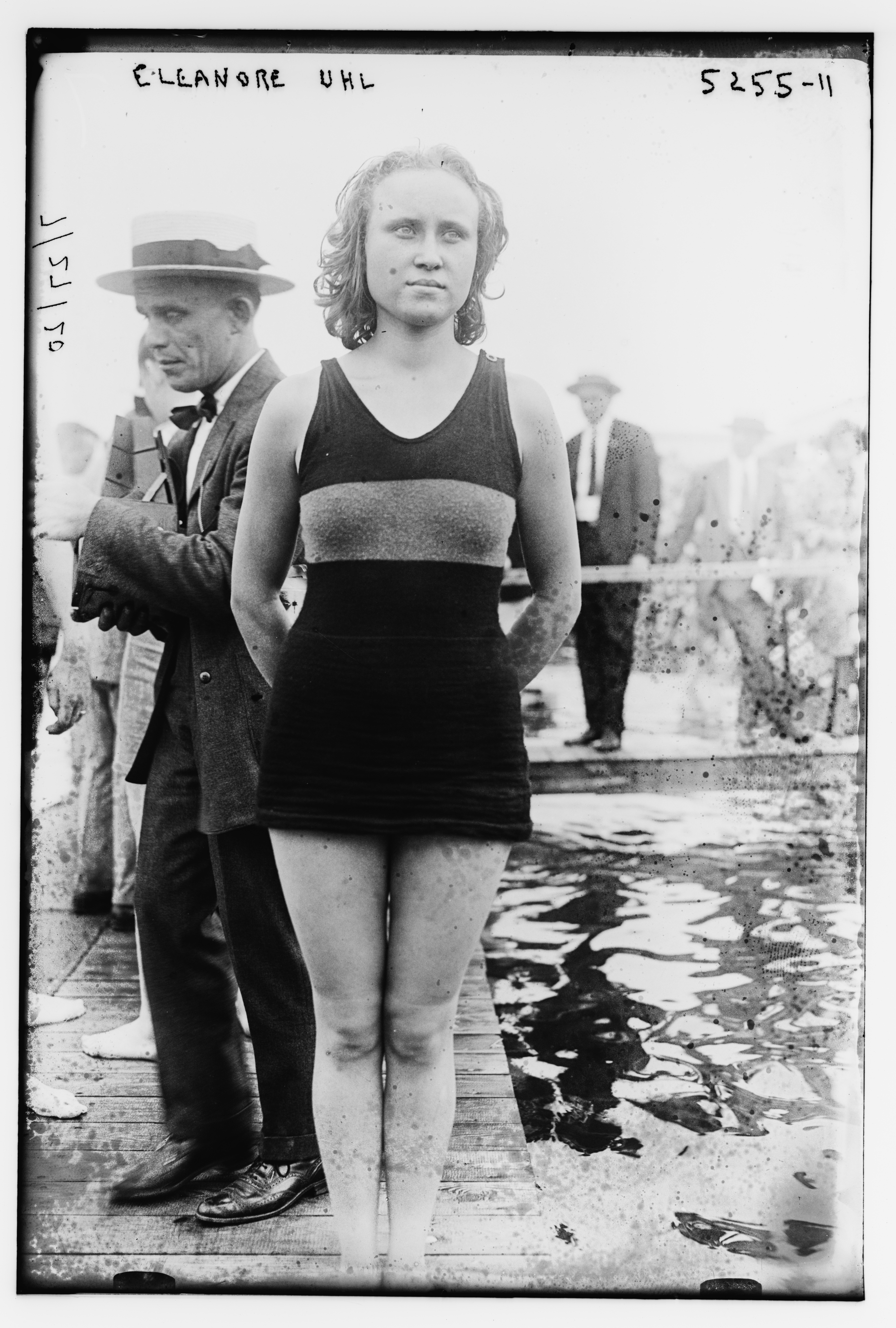

Personal information
- Full name: Eleanor Marie Uhl
- National team: United States
- Born: March 21, 1902 Philadelphia, Pennsylvania, U.S.
- Died: July 21, 1981 (aged 79) Doylestown, Pennsylvania, U.S.
- Height: 5 ft 5 in (1.65 m)

Sport
- Sport: Swimming
- Strokes: Freestyle
- Club: Meadowbrook Club

Eleanor Marie Uhl (March 21, 1902 – July 21, 1981), also known by her married name Eleanor Gash, was an American competition swimmer who represented the United States as an 18-year-old at the 1920 Summer Olympics in Antwerp, Belgium. Uhl competed in the women's 300-meter freestyle, advanced to the event final, and finished fifth overall.
