= Eva Chaloupková =

Czech swimmer

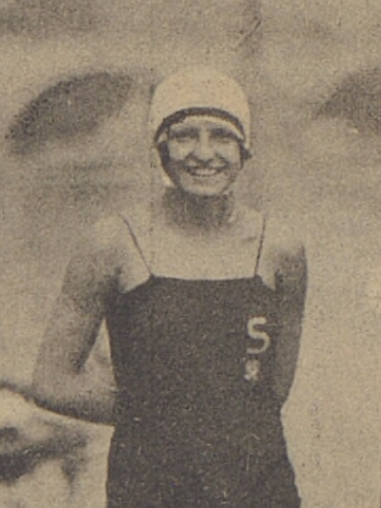

Personal information
- Born: 2 January 1905 Nový Bydžov, Austria-Hungary

Sport
- Sport: Swimming

Eva Chaloupková (born 2 January 1905, date of death unknown) was a Czech swimmer. She competed in the women's 400 metre freestyle event at the 1924 Summer Olympics.
