= Frances Schroth =

American swimmer (1893–1961)

- Schroth at 1920 Olympics

Personal information
- Full name: Frances Cowells Schroth
- National team: United States
- Born: April 11, 1893 Toledo, Ohio, U.S.
- Died: October 6, 1961 (aged 68) Guadalajara, Mexico
- Height: 5 ft 6 in (1.68 m)
- Spouse: George Schroth Jr. (m. 1918)

Sport
- Sport: Swimming
- Strokes: Freestyle
- Club: Athens Athletic Club
Medal record
Women's swimming
Representing the United States
Olympic Games
Gold medal – first place	1920 Antwerp	4×100 m freestyle
Bronze medal – third place	1920 Antwerp	100 m freestyle
Bronze medal – third place	1920 Antwerp	300 m freestyle

Frances Cowells Schroth (April 11, 1893 – October 6, 1961), known as Frances Cowells prior to her marriage to George Schroth Jr. in October, 1918, was an American competition swimmer for the Athens Athletic Club, a 1920 Antwerp Olympic champion in the Women's 4×100-meter freestyle relay, a bronze medalist in both the 100 and 300-meter freestyle events, and a former world record-holder. She attended the 1924 Olympics as an alternate in the 100-meter backstroke, but did not participate.

Frances Cowells was born in Toledo, Ohio on April 11, 1893. By 1918, she trained and competed for the Athens Club of Oakland, California.

Cowells was undefeated in women's competition at the swimming exhibition given at San Francisco's World Fair in 1915. In her swimming career, she set four American records, and by 1925 held Pacific Athletic Association (PAA) records in every women's event but the 220-yard backstroke.

== Marriage to George Schroth ==
In October, 1918, Cowells married George Schroth Jr., an American Olympic bronze medalist in water polo at the 1924 Summer Olympics, and a member of the U.S. Men's Olympic swimming team at Antwerp in 1920. George Schroth Jr. swam for Sacramento's Riverside Baths Team in his hometown, then moved to San Francisco's Olympic Club. George and Frances Schroth separated in August, 1925 and on November 15 of that year, Frances Schroth sought a divorce in Alameda, California, contending that her husband George Jr. and his father George Sr. were compelling her to continue as a swim athlete, and to work as a sports journalist for swimming competition against her will. She sought alimony, legal fees, and the custody of their son George, born in 1921. In December, 1925, once her divorce was finalized, she obtained a property settlement, rather than alimony, and her son George was temporarily placed in the care of her mother, though she continued to be known as Frances Schroth.

== 1920 Antwerp Olympics ==
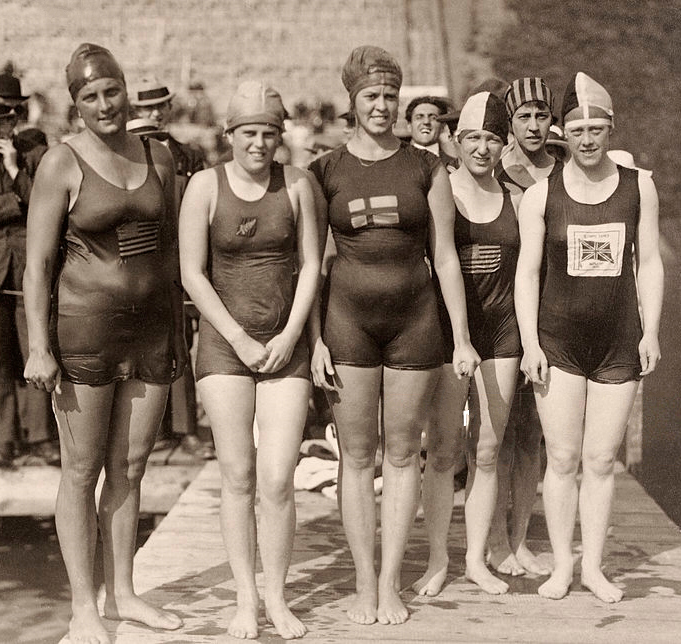
1920 100-meter finalists, Bliebtrey, Walrond, Gylling, Guest, Schroth, Jeans; Schroth with striped bathing cap, 2nd from right

As Frances Schroth, she represented the United States at the 1920 Summer Olympics in Antwerp, Belgium, winning a gold and two bronze medals.

She won the gold medal as a member of the first-place U.S. team in the 4×100-meter freestyle relay, together with Margaret Woodbridge, Irene Guest and Ethelda Bleibtrey. The American relay team set a new world record of 5:11.6 in the event final.

Individually, Schroth won a bronze medal for her third-place performance in the women's 100-meter freestyle recording a time of 1:17.2, in a close finish with American Irene Guest who swam a 1:17.0. American teammate Ethelda Bleibtrey won the event with a world record time of 1:13.6 by a significant 4 second margin over Irene Geust. Bleibtrey had previously set a world record of 1:14.4 in the preliminaries for the event.

She won another bronze medal in the women's 300-meter freestyle recording a time of 4:52.0.

== 1924 Paris Olympics ==
In the 1924 Olympic trials in Indianapolis, Indiana, Schroth finished third in the 100-meter backstroke to Sybil Bauer and Doris O'Mara, qualifying her as an alternate in the event. At the age of 31 Schroth attended the Paris Olympics as an alternate in the 100-meter backstroke, but did not participate in the competition.

=== Olympic world record ===
Schroth's best known record was her world record set at the Antwerp Olympics on August 29, 1920, in the 4x100-meter freestyle relay. Her U.S. Women's Olympic relay team combined world record time of 5:11.6 held until July 20, 1924.

=== Post swimming careers ===
In 1925, she helped in the coaching of swimming prospect Edith Bradley, favored as a junior backstroke champion and a member of Schroth's Athens Club, and in 1925 assisted in the coaching of 15-year old Eleanor Garatti of San Rafael at the National Swimming Championship in Florida.

Schroth competed in women's golf, attempting to qualify for the women's Pebble Beach Championship in Del Monte, California on February 14, 1926, though she was not considered a favorite to place.

In 1929, Schroth worked as an artist, with several of her drawings of cats featured in the San Francisco Examiner, helping to advertise a Cat Show sponsored by the Pacific Cat Club in San Francisco. She later competed in chess tournaments as an avocation, placing second at a tournament in Sonoma, California in June, 1952.

Her dachshund "Asbeck Hennich", was featured as an entry at the Oakland Kennel Club in September, 1936.

Frances Cowells Schroth died October 6, 1961, in Guadalajara, Mexico and was buried in Panteon Guadalajara.

== See also ==
- List of Olympic medalists in swimming (women)
- World record progression 4 × 100 metres freestyle relay
