= Irene Guest =

American swimmer (1900–1970)

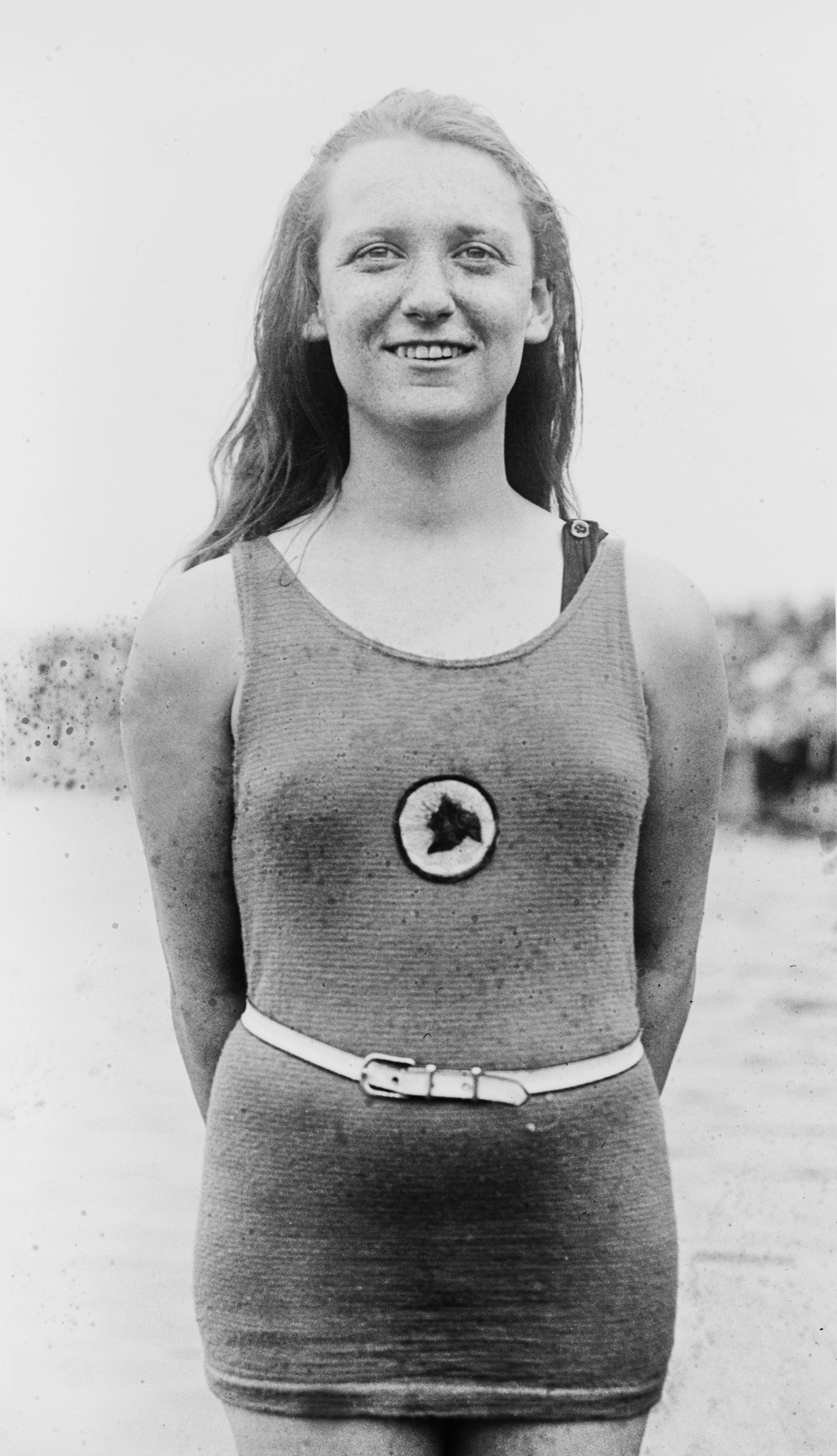

Personal information
- Full name: Irene May Guest
- National team: United States
- Born: July 22, 1900 Philadelphia, Pennsylvania, U.S.
- Died: June 14, 1970 (aged 69) Ocean Gate, New Jersey, U.S.
- Height: 5 ft 2 in (1.57 m)

Sport
- Sport: Swimming
- Strokes: Freestyle
- Club: Meadowbrook Club
- College team: Temple University
Medal record
Women's swimming
Representing the United States
Olympic Games
Gold medal – first place	1920 Antwerp	4×100 m freestyle
Silver medal – second place	1920 Antwerp	100 m freestyle

Irene May Guest (July 22, 1900 – June 14, 1970), also known by her married name Irene Loog, was an American competition swimmer, 1920 Olympic champion in the 4x100 meter freestyle relay, and world record-holder.

Early in her swimming career at 17 in April, 1918, while representing the local YMCA she took second place in the Middle Atlanta AAU 220-yard title swim, with a time of 3:14.6.

== 1920 Olympics ==
At the 1920 Olympic trails, swimming for Philadelphia's Meadowbrook Club, Guest placed third in the 100-meter freestyle, qualifying for her for the Olympic games.

Travelling with the team, Guest represented the United States as a 19-year-old at the 1920 Summer Olympics in Antwerp, Belgium, where she received a pair of medals. She received her first medal in the women's 100-meter freestyle in which she finished second behind fellow American Ethelda Bleibtrey, earning a silver medal with a time of 1:17.0. Though Guest won her preliminary heat in a time of 1:18.8 and made a nearly two-second improvement in the final, she was unable to beat Bleibtrey’s new world record of 1:13.6.

In the women's 4×100 metres freestyle relay, she won a gold medal with U.S. teammates Bleibtrey, Frances Schroth and Margaret Woodbridge in a new world-record time of 5:11.6.

In the Middle Atlantic AAU Diving Championship in Philadelphia in February 1921, while representing the Meadowbrook Athletic Club, Guest swam a 1:09 in the 100 freestyle, defeating frequent rival Elizabeth Becker. At the March 1921 National Women's Indoor championship in New Jersey, Guest took second in the women's 100-yard Open Final.

Guest attended and swam for Temple University in Philadelphia. In 1920, at a meeting of the Temple University Women's Club, she played selected violin pieces. In February, 1921, swimming for the Meadowbrook Athletic Club, guest won the 100-yard freestyle event in a time of 1:09 minutes at the Middle Atlantic AAU Championship, with Elizabeth Beck placing second.

=== Honors ===
Guest was inducted into the International Swimming Hall of Fame as an "honor pioneer swimmer" in 1990.

== See also ==
- List of members of the International Swimming Hall of Fame
- List of Olympic medalists in swimming (women)
- World record progression 4 × 100 metres freestyle relay
