= Gwitha Shand =

New Zealand swimmer

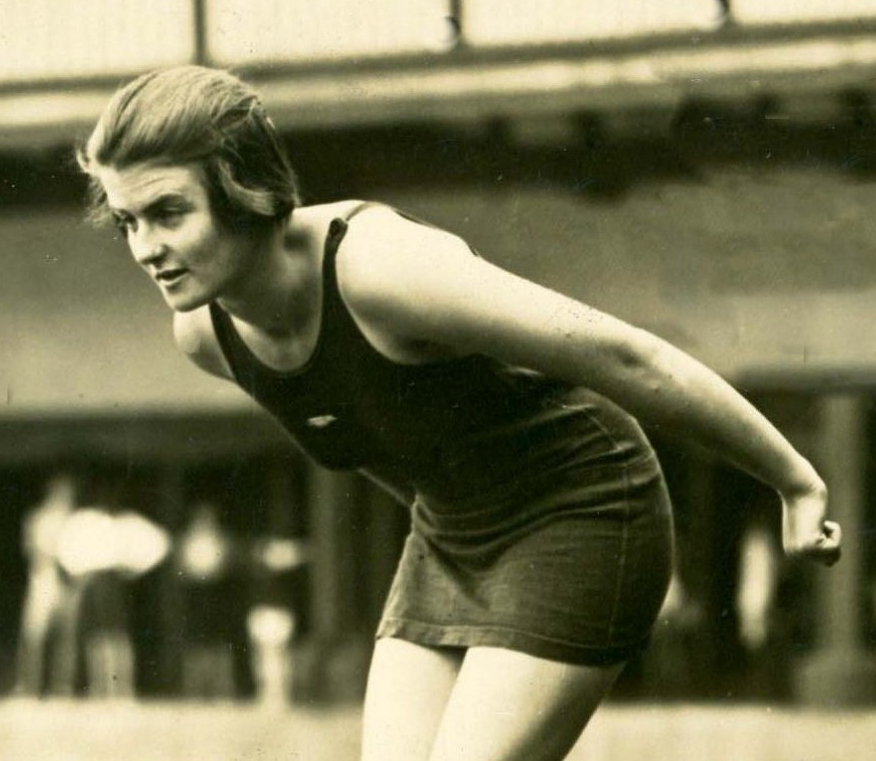
- Gwitha Shand in 1923

Personal information
- Born: 31 July 1904 Christchurch, New Zealand
- Died: 11 December 1962 (aged 58)
- Height: 1.65 m (5 ft 5 in)

Sport
- Sport: Swimming

Gwitha Ifwersen Shand (31 July 1904 – 11 December 1962) was a New Zealand swimmer, who competed in two events at the 1924 Summer Olympics in Paris. In the 100m freestyle she was eliminated in the semi-finals. In the final of the 400m freestyle she did not finish. Shand and fellow swimmer Clarrie Heard caught colds before the Olympics and neither was able to swim at their best, Shand in particular having trouble breathing during her races.

Shand was the National record holder in the 200 metres freestyle in 1924.

In 1929, she married Douglas Rupert Waghorn and they went on to have three children.
