= Florence Sancroft =

British swimmer

Personal information
- Born: 30 December 1902 Hoxton, London, England
- Died: 22 January 1978 (aged 75) Islington, London, England

Sport
- Sport: Swimming

Florence Sancroft (30 December 1902 – 22 January 1978) was a British swimmer. She competed in the women's 300 metre freestyle event at the 1920 Summer Olympics.
