= Clarrie Heard =

New Zealand swimmer

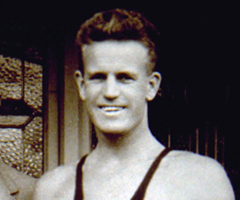

Personal information
- National team: New Zealand
- Born: 8 June 1906 Christchurch, New Zealand
- Died: 27 May 1990 (aged 83)

Sport
- Sport: Swimming
- Strokes: Breastroke

Ernest Clarence Trevail "Clarrie" Heard (8 June 1906 – 27 May 1990) was a New Zealand swimmer, who competed in the 200 m breaststroke at the 1924 Summer Olympics in Paris. Heard was eliminated in the heats with a time of 3:09.0. His best time before the Olympics was 3:02.2 which was the same as the fourth-placed finisher in the final. Along with fellow swimmer Gwitha Shand, Heard caught a cold before the Games and was not at his best.
