= Gurli Ewerlund =

Swedish swimmer

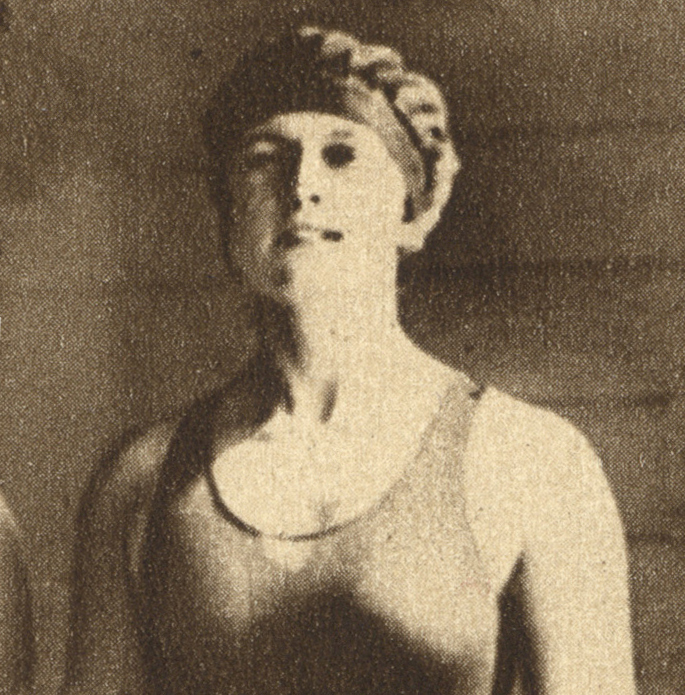

Personal information
- Nationality: Swedish
- Born: 13 October 1902 Malmö, Sweden
- Died: 10 June 1985 (aged 82) Malmö, Sweden

Sport
- Sport: Swimming
- Strokes: Freestyle
- Club: Malmö SS (−1934); SK Ran (1934–)
Medal record
Representing Sweden
Olympic Games
Bronze medal – third place	1924 Paris	4×100 m freestyle relay

Gurli Ewerlund (13 October 1902 – 10 June 1985) was a Swedish freestyle swimmer who won a bronze medal in the 4 × 100 m freestyle relay at the 1924 Summer Olympics, along with Aina Berg, Wivan Pettersson and Hjördis Töpel. She also competed in the individual 100 m and 400 m events, but failed to reach the finals.
