= Hilda James =

British swimmer (1904–1982)

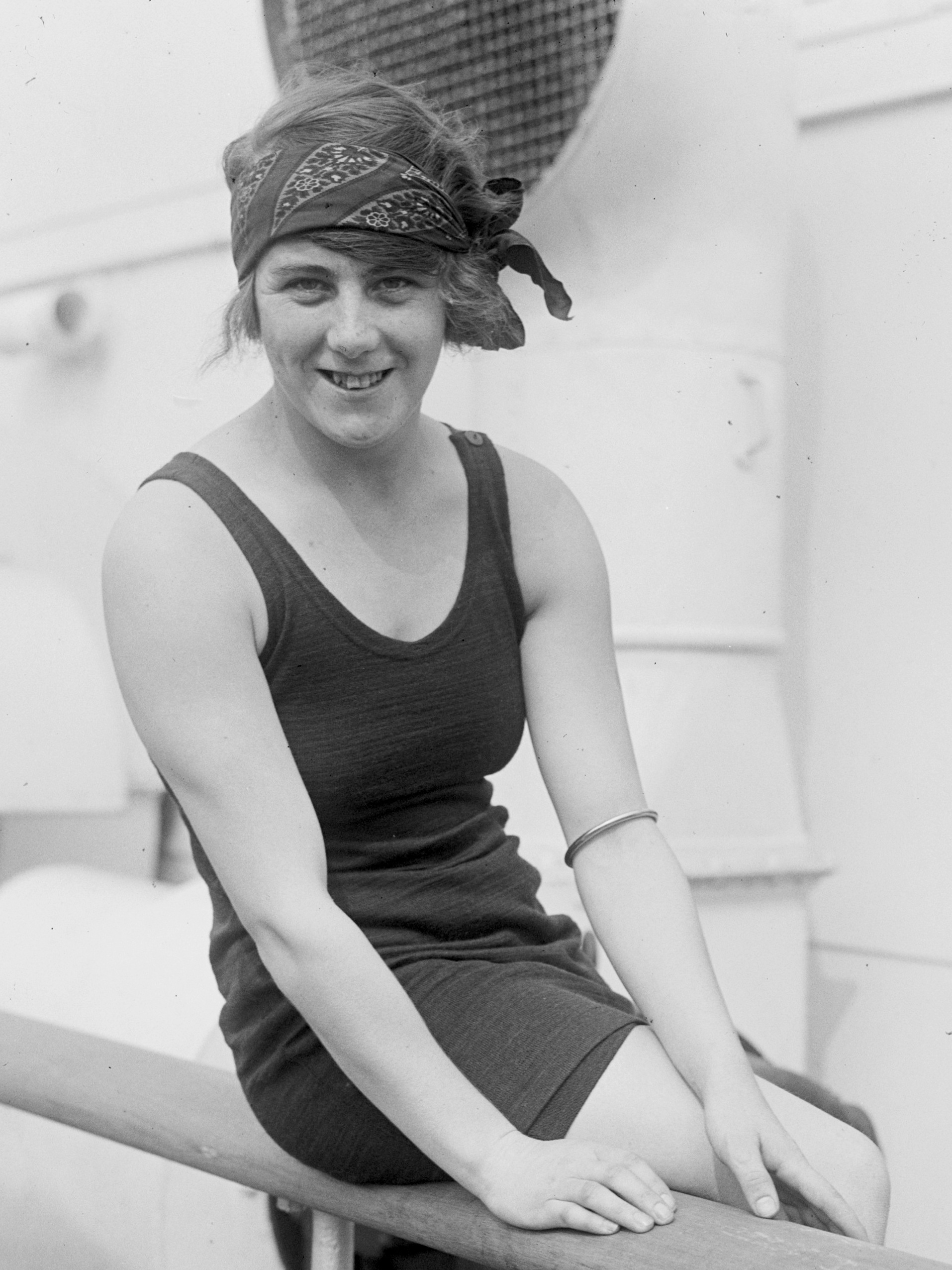
- James in 1925

Personal information
- Full name: Hilda Marjorie James
- National team: Great Britain
- Born: 27 April 1904 Liverpool, England
- Died: 27 July 1982 (aged 78) Birkenhead, England

Sport
- Sport: Swimming
- Club: Garston SC
Medal record
Women's swimming
Representing Great Britain
Olympic Games
| Silver medal – second place | 1920 Antwerp | 4×100 m freestyle relay |

Hilda Marjorie James (27 April 1904 – 27 July 1982) was a British competitive swimmer who competed at the 1920 Summer Olympics. James won a silver medal in the women's 4×100-metre freestyle relay and swam in the semifinals of the 300-metre freestyle event. She held seven world records and 29 English records.

== Life ==
James was born in 1904 to Gertrude Acton and John James. Her father was a postman and window cleaner. She began training at the Garston Baths in Liverpool. Her initial swims were arranged for her to occupy her time during her school's religious classes as her parents did not want her to attend.

By the time she was 16, she was the best choice to go to the Olympics, but her speed was no match for the Americans who took most of the medals. There were not many swimming events for women, but the British relay team took silver in the 4 × 100 m freestyle relay. By 1924, she held every British record from 100 yards to the mile. She should have gone to the 1924 Olympics, but she was yet 21, and her mother demanded that she should be sent too as a chaperone. In the standoff over this, James lost her place. She was thought to have taken three medals, but she cited "unfair criticism, unfair treatment and boycott by certain officials in the swimming world." Very shortly after the Olympics, she gained independence on her 21st birthday, and she took a job with Cunard Line. She was employed as a celebrity. She resigned from this job in 1927 as she was to be the first woman to swim the English Channel. She prepared in France, but no attempt was made that year, and in October, Mercedes Gleitze became the first woman to swim the Channel. Another attempt by James was proposed for 1928 but it never happened. One source says that during this time she was still working for Cunard.

She married (William) Hugh McAllister in 1930 who worked on Cunard's luxury liner Carinthia. They had one child, Donald Hugh McAllister. That same year in March, Mercedes Gleitze was in Liverpool where she was attempting a 31-hour exhibition endurance swim. James turned up without warning and after Gleitze realized who she was, she took up her offer to look after her and feed her during the long night of her attempt.

Hilda died in 1982 in Birkenhead.

== Records ==
She held seven world records and 29 English records and every British record from 150 yards to one mile.

== See also ==
- List of Olympic medalists in swimming (women)
- World record progression 400 metres freestyle
