= Margaret Woodbridge =

American swimmer

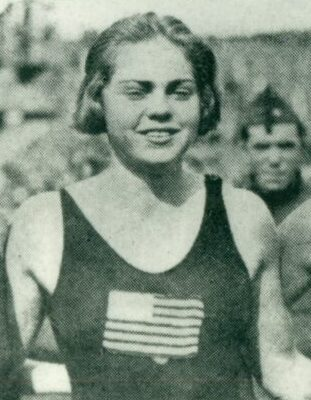
- Woodbridge in 1920

Personal information
- Full name: Margaret Darling Woodbridge
- National team: United States
- Born: January 6, 1902 Detroit, Michigan, U.S.
- Died: February 23, 1995 (aged 93) Brooklyn, New York, U.S.
- Height: 5 ft 7 in (1.70 m)

Sport
- Sport: Swimming
- Strokes: Freestyle
- Club: Detroit Athletic Club
Medal record
Women's swimming
Representing the United States
Olympic Games
Gold medal – first place	1920 Antwerp	4×100 m freestyle
Silver medal – second place	1920 Antwerp	300 m freestyle

Margaret Darling Woodbridge (January 6, 1902 – February 23, 1995), also known by her married name Margaret Presley, was an American competition swimmer for the Detroit Athletic Club, a 1920 Antwerp Olympic gold medalist, and a world record-holder. She was a member of the first U.S. Olympic Women's swimming team.

Swimming for the Detroit Athletic Club, she finished first at the Women's Aquatic Club 4-mile swim in Michigan with a time of 1:09.13, over two minutes ahead of her closest competitor, Euphrasia Donnely. The four mile route went from the Fellowcraft Athletic Club to the Detroit Boat Club.

Woodbridge, trained by Hall of Fame Coach Matthew Mann of the Detroit Athletic Club, set national records in both the 200 and 500-yard freestyle events and gave serious competition to the dominant swimmers from the Women’s Swimming Association of New York.

== 1920 Olympics ==
At the finals of the 1920 Olympic Trials, Woodbridge placed fifth in the 100-meter freestyle and fourth in the 300-meter freestyle. Though she qualified only as an alternate, she would improve her times in Olympic competition and play a major part in the winning of medals for the U.S. Women's team.

=== Gold medal ===
Later representing the United States at the 1920 Summer Olympics in Antwerp, Belgium, she won the gold medal as a member of the winning U.S. team in the women's 4×100-meter freestyle relay. Woodbridge and her American relay teammates Frances Schroth, Irene Guest and Ethelda Bleibtrey set a new world record of 5:11.6 in the event final.

=== Silver medal ===
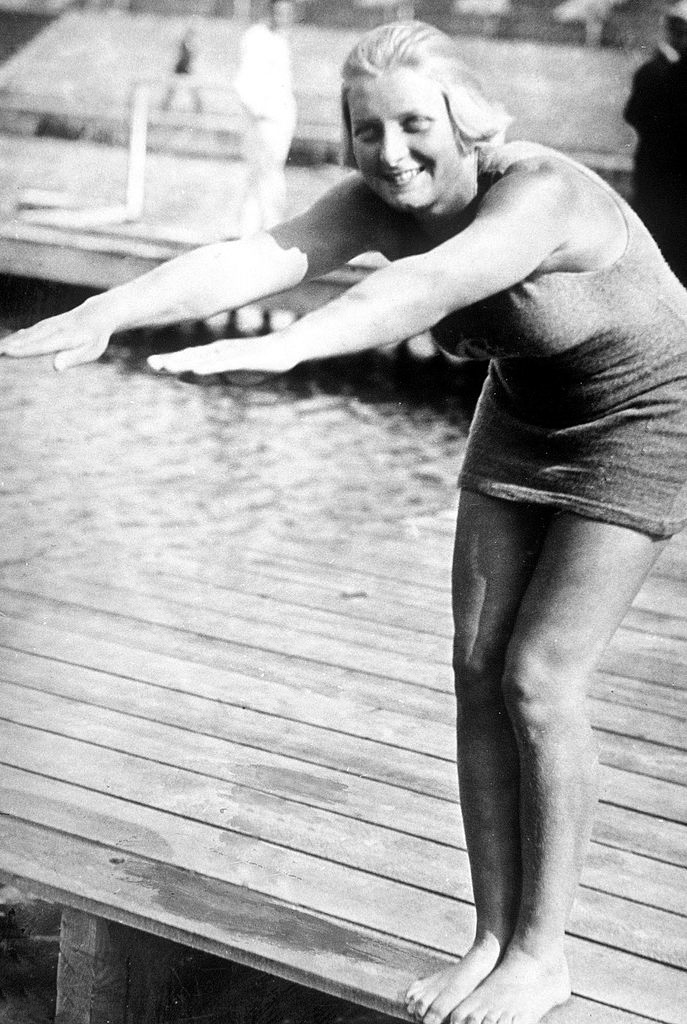
E. Bleibtrey, 1920

Individually, Woodbridge received a silver medal for her second-place performance of 4:42.8 in the women's 300-meter freestyle, finishing behind American teammate Ethelda Bleibtrey of New York's Women's Swimming Association. Having previously broken the world record in the 100-meter event, Bleibtrey then broke the world record for the women's 300-meter event as well in both the heats and the finals. The prior record had been 4:43.6, which Bleibtrey set earlier in the year. The 300-meter freestyle would never again be an Olympic event. In the following Olympics in 1924 and from then on, women competed at the more standard distance of 400 meters.

=== Honors ===
Woodbridge was inducted into the International Swimming Hall of Fame as an "Honor Pioneer Swimmer" in 1989.

== See also ==
- List of members of the International Swimming Hall of Fame
- List of Olympic medalists in swimming (women)
- World record progression 4 × 100 metres freestyle relay
