= Vera Tanner =

English swimmer

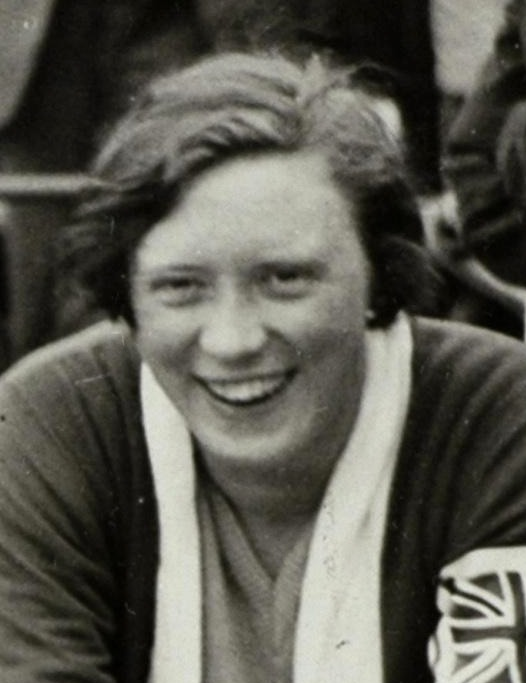
- Iris Vera Tanner (1928 Olympics)

Personal information
- Born: 20 November 1906 Eastbourne, Sussex, England
- Died: 22 February 1971 (aged 64)

Sport
- Sport: Swimming
Medal record
Women's swimming
Representing Great Britain
Olympic Games
Silver medal – second place	1924 Paris	4×100 m freestyle
Silver medal – second place	1928 Amsterdam	4×100 m freestyle

Iris Vera Tanner (20 November 1906 – 22 February 1971) was an English swimmer born in Eastbourne, who competed in the 1924 and 1928 Summer Olympics. At the 1924 Olympics she won a silver medal in the 4×100 m freestyle relay event and was fifth in the 100 m freestyle event. In the 400 m freestyle competition she was eliminated in the semi-finals. Four years later in Amsterdam she won her second silver medal in the 4×100 m freestyle relay event, was sixth in the 400 m freestyle event and fourth in her heat in the semi-finals of 100 m freestyle event and did not advance.

== See also ==
- List of Olympic medalists in swimming (women)
