= Agnes Geraghty =

American swimmer (1907–1974)

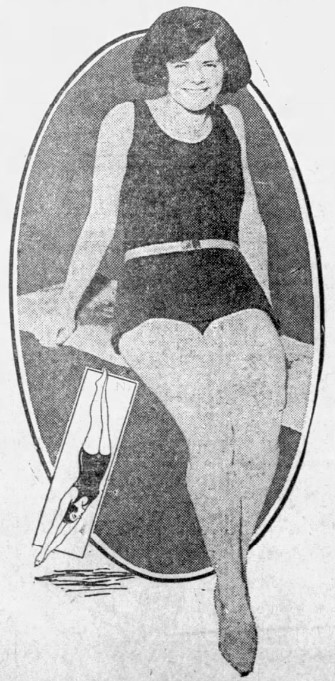

Personal information
- Full name: Agnes Geraghty -McAndrews
- National team: United States
- Born: November 26, 1907 New York, New York, U.S.
- Died: March 1, 1974 (aged 66) Oceanside, New York, U.S.
- Spouse: Felix McAndrews m. 1933

Sport
- Sport: Swimming
- Strokes: Breaststroke
- Club: Women's Swimming Association
- Coach: Louis Handley (WSA)
Medal record
Women's swimming
Representing the United States
Olympic Games
Silver medal – second place	1924 Paris	200 m breaststroke

Agnes Geraghty (November 26, 1907 – March 1, 1974), also known by her married name Agnes McAndrews, was an American competition swimmer who swam for the Women's Swimming Association of New York, and represented the United States at the 1924 and 1928 Summer Olympics.

== Early life ==
Agnes Geraghty was born on November 26, 1907 in New York City, to Ambrose G. Geraghty, a gem appraiser for the Provident Loan Society formerly from Ireland, and Gertrude A. Geraghty. Agnes began swimming in 1922-23, and was coached and mentored by 1904 Olympic Gold medalist L.D.B. Handley, of the New York Women's Swimming Association based in Brooklyn, where Agnes trained throughout her career. The club had an outstanding program that produced many women Olympians and champions including Gertrude Ederle, Aileen Riggin, Eleanor Holm, and Helen Wainwright. It was founded by Charlotte Epstein in 1917.

== 1924-1928 Olympics ==
At the 1924 Olympics in Paris, Geraghty won a silver medal in the women's 200-meter breaststroke with a time of 3:34.0. Unable to match her Olympic record time of 3:29.6 in the semi-final heat of the event, Geraghty would have won the gold if she had gone under 3:33, the gold medal winning time. Though None of the three medal winners in the event went under their semi-final times. The official 1924 U.S. Women's Swimming Head Coach was Louis Handley, her coach at WSA.

In a preliminary heat for the event, 200-meter breaststroke favorite Marie Baron of the Netherlands was disqualified for an illegal turn, when she touched the wall with only one hand instead of two hands required by the rules. Baron had set a time in her heat five seconds faster than any other entrants and would have been a very strong favorite in the finals. Another favorite, Britain's Irene Gilbert was ill, and could not compete. With Baron disqualified, and Gilbert ill, Geraghty became the favorite. Geraghty led the final event for around 150 meters, but an unexpected late sprint from British swimmer Lucy Morton gave the first individual gold medal to the British team.

At the 1928 Olympics, Geraghty was fourth with a time of 3:18.8 in her semifinal of the 200-meter breaststroke event and did not advance. Her time was 16 seconds faster than her 1924 Silver medal final time, but the highly competitive international field had become considerably faster since the 1924 Paris Olympics. Hall of Fame Coach Bob Kiphuth, who coached the Yale Men's swimming team, managed the U.S. Olympic women's swim team that year.

=== Swimming achievements ===
By 1926, she held 10 world records in the breaststroke for distances ranging from 50-yards to 400-meters. Geraghty won a total of 10 AAU breaststroke titles from 1924-1930. She was the 1928 and 1929 United States women's breast-stroke national champion at 220 yards, and held 17 swimming records during her career. She set an Olympic record in the semi-finals of the 1924 Paris Olympics, but was not able to match that time in the finals.

In 1932, turning professional, she performed in the Jones Beach Water Ballet.

She married Felix Andrews, an insurance adjuster, in 1933, and resided on Long Island through 1974.

=== Coaching ===
After marrying Felix McAndrews, Agnes Geraghty McAndrews coached swimming and provided lessons, initially at Jones Beach Park and then for the South Shore Yacht Club in Freeport, Long Island in the 40's and early 50's, and likely longer.

Geraghty McAndrews died on March 1, 1974 of cancer in South Nassau Community Hospital in Oceanside, New York. Services were held at the Queen of Most Holy Rosary Church in Roosevelt, Long Island. She had been living in Baldwin, New York in Nassau, County, Long Island. She was survived by a daughter, a sister, and two grandchildren.

== See also ==
- List of Olympic medalists in swimming (women)
