= Florence Barker (swimmer) =

British Olympic swimmer

Personal information
- Full name: Florence Barker
- National team: Great Britain
- Born: 23 March 1908
- Died: 1986 (aged 77–78)

Sport
- Sport: Swimming
- Strokes: Freestyle
Medal record
Women's swimming
Representing Great Britain
Olympic Games
Silver medal – second place	1924 Paris	4×100 m freestyle relay

Florence Barker (23 March 1908 – 1986) was a competitive swimmer who represented Great Britain at the 1924 Summer Olympics in Paris, where she won a silver medal as a member of the second-placed British women's team in the 4×100-metre freestyle relay event. In individual competition, she advanced to the semi-finals of the women's 100-metre freestyle event, finishing ninth overall.

== See also ==
- List of Olympic medalists in swimming (women)
