= Ingegärd Töpel =

Swedish diver

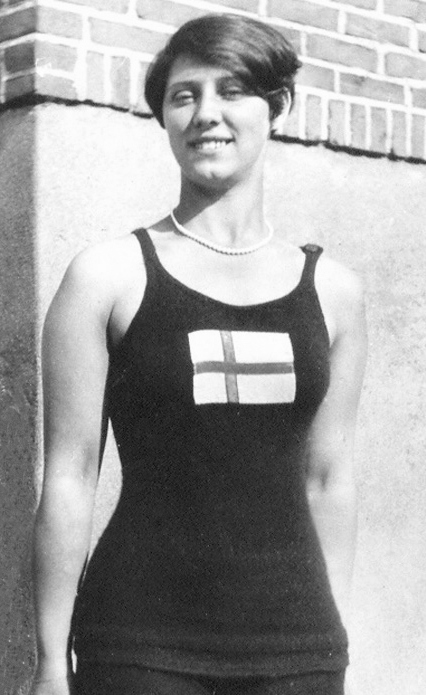

Personal information
- Born: 13 May 1906 Gothenburg, Sweden
- Died: 11 July 1988 (aged 82) Göteborg, Sweden

Sport
- Sport: Diving
- Club: SK Najaden, Göteborg

Ingegärd Margareta Töpel (13 May 1906 – 11 July 1988) was a Swedish diver. She competed in the 10 m platform event at the 1928 Summer Olympics, alongside her elder sister Hjördis, but neither of them advanced into the final round.
