= Ethelda Bleibtrey =

American swimmer (1902–1978)

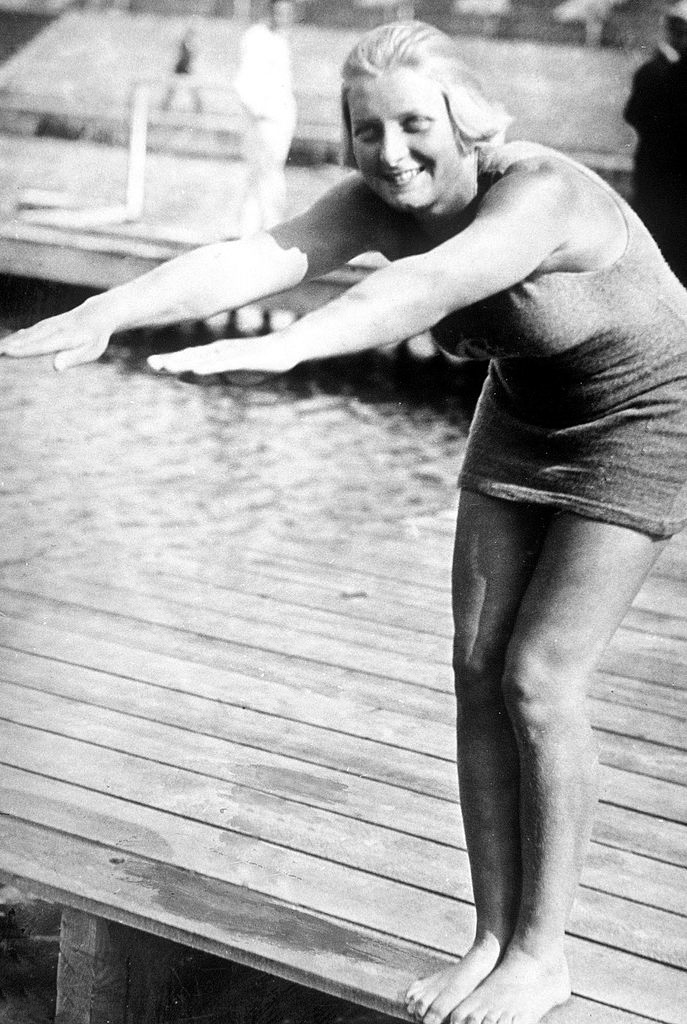
- Bleibtrey at 1920 Olympics

Personal information
- Full name: Ethelda Marguerite Bleibtrey
- Nickname: "Thel"
- National team: United States
- Born: February 27, 1902 Waterford, New York, U.S.
- Died: May 6, 1978 (aged 76) West Palm Beach, Florida, U.S.

Sport
- Sport: Swimming
- Strokes: Backstroke; Freestyle
- Club: Women's Swimming Association
- Coach: Louis Handley
Medal record
Women's swimming
Representing the United States
Olympic Games
Gold medal – first place	1920 Antwerp	100 m freestyle
Gold medal – first place	1920 Antwerp	300 m freestyle
Gold medal – first place	1920 Antwerp	4 × 100 m freestyle relay

Ethelda Marguerite Bleibtrey (February 27, 1902 – May 6, 1978), also known by her married name Ethelda Schlatke, was an American competition swimmer for the Women's Swimming Association, a three-time world record breaking 1920 Olympic gold medalist, and a former world record-holder in multiple events. She was first woman to win three Olympic gold medals.

== Early life and activism ==
Bleibtrey was born in Waterford, New York, to John and Maggie Bleibtrey. She started swimming to help recover from polio, which she contracted in 1917. Bleibtrey swam for the Women's Swimming Association (WSA) of New York, founded by Charlotte Epstein in 1917, and coached by Louis Handley, a former 1904 Olympic gold medalist in swimming and water polo. Epstein would also manage the 1920 U.S. Women's Olympic swim team when Bleibtrey attended.

In 1919, Bleibtrey was arrested for "nude swimming" at Manhattan Beach after removing her stockings at a pool where it was forbidden to bare "the lower female extremities for public bathing." The subsequent public support for Bleibtrey helped lead to the abandonment of stockings as a conventional element in women's swimwear. Charlote Epstein, the manager of Bleibtrey's Women's Swimming Association also campaigned for more practical women's swimsuits, for allowing women to be members of the American Athletic Union, to add more AAU swimming events for women, and to include distance events for women in AAU competition.

== World records ==
Bleibtrey set the first official world record in the 440-yards freestyle on August 16, 1919, in New York, with a time of 6:30.2. She set a world record in the 100-meter freestyle of 1:13.6 at the August, 1920 Antwerp Olympics.

== 1920 Olympics ==
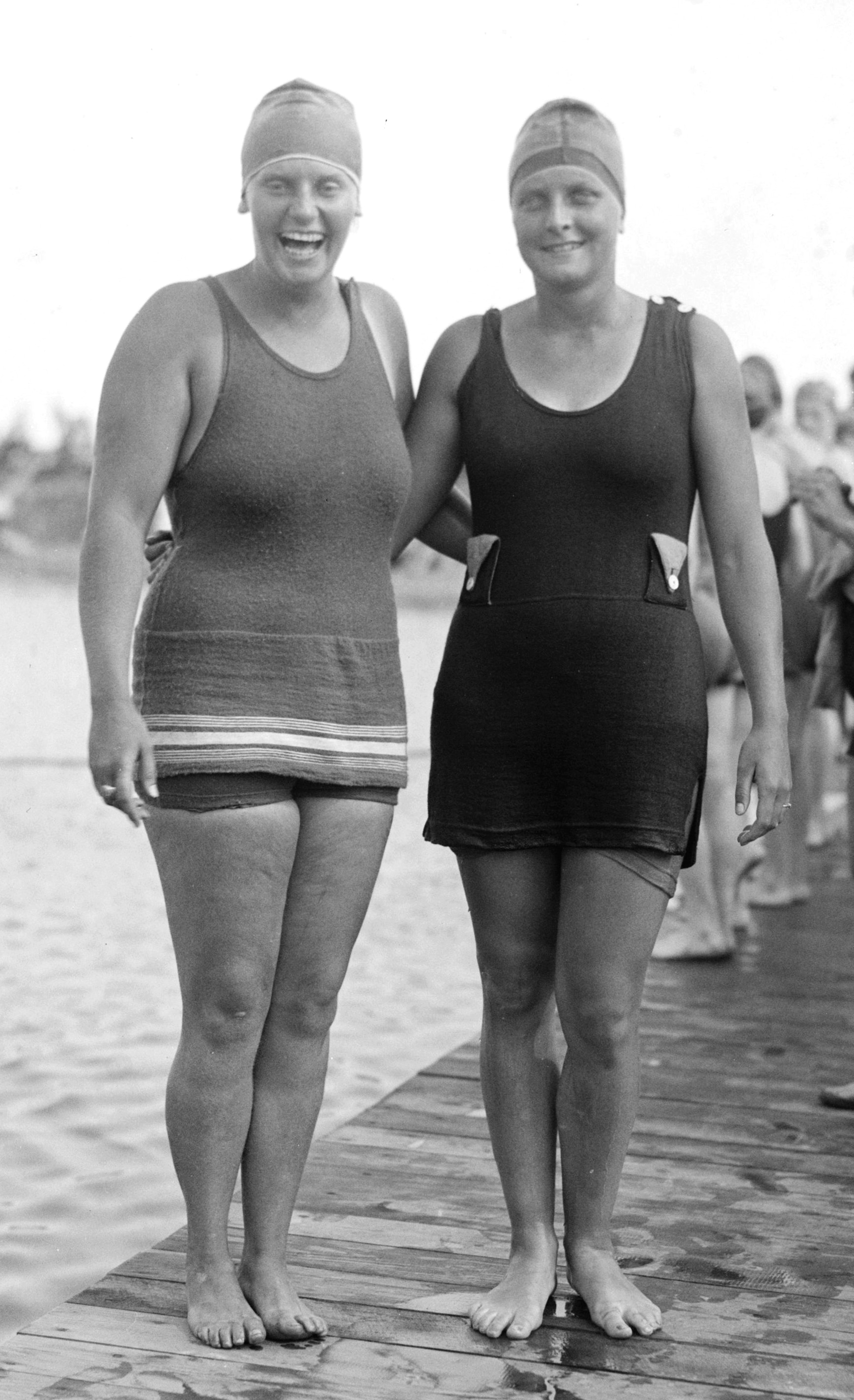
Boyle (l) and Bleibtrey (r)

Bleibtrey was a dominant backstroke swimmer but entered and won gold medals in three freestyle events as there were no women's backstroke events yet offered at the 1920 Summer Olympics in Antwerp, Belgium. Several of her 1920 U.S. Olympic teammates swam and trained with her at the WSA, including 1920 diving gold medalist Aileen Riggin, 1920 diving silver medalist Helen Wainwright, and 1920 100-meter participant Charlotte Boyle.

She also won a gold medal as a member of the winning U.S. team in the women's 4×100-meter freestyle relay, together with teammates Margaret Woodbridge, Frances Schroth and Irene Guest. The American relay team set a new world record of 5:11.6 in the event final. Individually, Bleibtrey also received gold medals and set world records in the women's 100-meter freestyle (1:13.6) and the women's 300-meter freestyle (4:34.0).

In later life, Bleibtrey coached and taught swimming in New York and Atlantic City and later became a nurse in North Palm Beach, Florida.

=== Honors ===
Bleibtrey was inducted into the International Swimming Hall of Fame as an "Honor Swimmer" in 1967. She died in West Palm Beach, Florida, in 1978.

== See also ==
- List of members of the International Swimming Hall of Fame
- List of multiple Olympic gold medalists
- List of Olympic medalists in swimming (women)
- World record progression 100 metres freestyle
- World record progression 400 metres freestyle
- World record progression 4 × 100 metres freestyle relay
- Charlotte Epstein

== Bibliography ==
- Floyd Conner, The Olympic's Most Wanted: The Top 10 Book of Gold Medal Gaffes, Improbable Triumphs, and Other Oddities, Brassey's (2002). ISBN 1-57488-413-1.

Records
Preceded by Fanny Durack	Women's 100-meter freestyle world record-holder (long course); August 23, 1920 – June 30, 1923	Succeeded by Gertrude Ederle
