= Lucy Morton =

British swimmer (1898–1980)

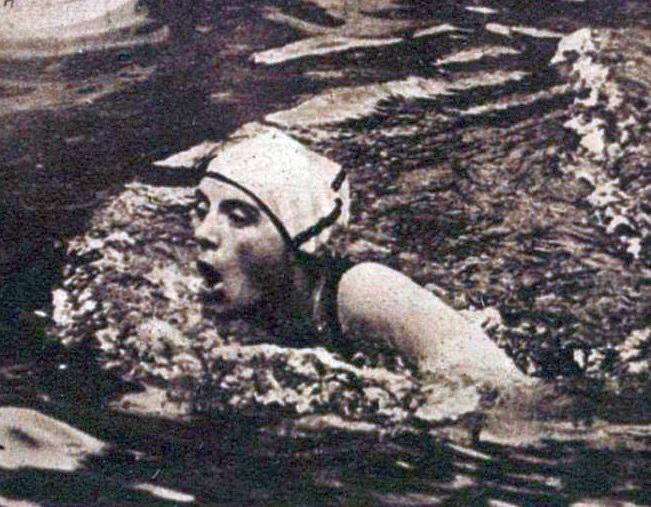

Personal information
- Full name: Lucy Morton
- National team: Great Britain
- Born: 23 February 1898 Knutsford, England
- Died: 26 August 1980 (aged 82) Blackpool, England

Sport
- Sport: Swimming
- Strokes: Breaststroke
Medal record
Women's swimming
Representing United Kingdom
Olympic Games
Gold medal – first place	1924 Paris	200 m breaststroke

Lucy Morton (23 February 1898 – 26 August 1980), later known by her married name Lucy Heaton, was an English competition swimmer who represented Great Britain at the 1924 Summer Olympics and won a gold medal in the 200-metre breaststroke event.

Morton was born in 1898 at New Tatton in Cheshire; her father Alfred was in domestic service as a groom. The family moved to Blackpool, and by the age of ten, Morton had joined the local amateur swimming club. By 1920, Morton held the world record for the 200-yard breaststroke. In 1924, she was chosen to be part of the British team at the 1924 Summer Olympics in Paris. Morton won the women's 200-metre breaststroke race and became the first British woman to win an Olympic gold medal for swimming in an individual (non-relay) event. At the time, she was working at the post office at St Annes. Blackpool council opened her local swimming baths so that she could train before and after work. On her return to the town, she was given a civic reception, where she was presented with the gift of a piano, and over ten thousand people lined the streets to greet her.

Morton retired from competitive swimming after the Olympics and married Harry Heaton in 1927. She continued supporting swimming events for the rest of her life, serving as a competitors' steward when she was aged 72. She died in Blackpool in 1980. She was inducted posthumously into the International Swimming Hall of Fame as an "Honor Pioneer Swimmer" in 1988.

A book based on her Olympic win and early life was published in June 2024, called Swim, written by Lisa Brace and published by Blue Pier Books.

She is commemorated by a blue plaque on Blackpool Town Hall.

== See also ==
- List of members of the International Swimming Hall of Fame
- List of Olympic medalists in swimming (women)
