= Grace McKenzie =

British swimmer (1903–1988)

Personal information
- Born: July 8, 1903 Garston, Liverpool, England
- Died: August 1988 (aged 85) Liverpool, England

Sport
- Sport: Swimming
Medal record
Representing Great Britain
Olympic Games
Silver medal – second place	1920 Antwerp	4×100 m freestyle relay
Silver medal – second place	1924 Paris	4×100 m freestyle relay

Grace McKenzie (8 July 1903 – August 1988) was an English swimmer from Garston, Liverpool, who competed in the 1920 and 1924 Summer Olympics.

In the 1920 Olympics, she won a silver medal in the 4×100 m freestyle relay event and was third in the first round of the 100 m freestyle event and fourth in the first round of the 300 m freestyle event and did not advance in both occasions. Four years later in Paris she again won a silver medal in the 4 × 100 m freestyle relay event.

== See also ==
- List of Olympic medalists in swimming (women)
