= Wivan Pettersson =

Swedish swimmer (1904–1976)

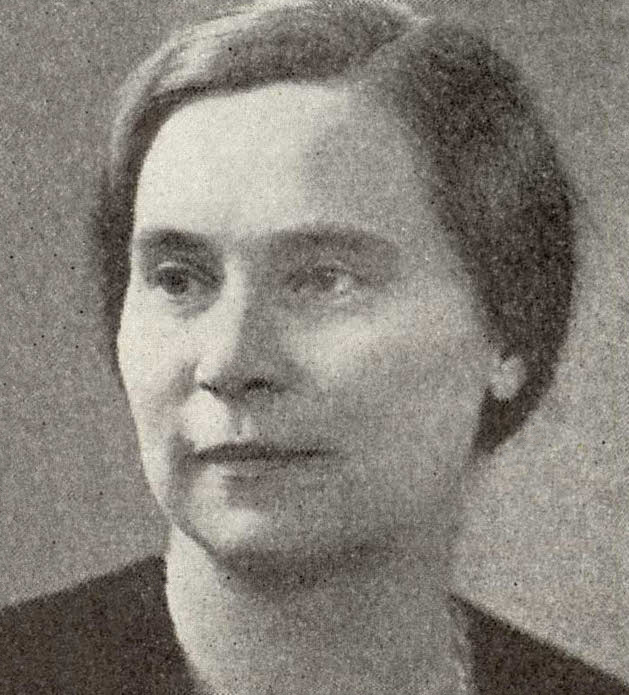

Personal information
- Nationality: Swedish
- Born: 24 January 1904 Eskilstuna, Sweden
- Died: 7 November 1976 (aged 72) Eskilstuna, Sweden

Sport
- Sport: Swimming
- Strokes: Freestyle, breaststroke
- Club: Eskilstuna SS
Medal record
Representing Sweden
Olympic Games
Bronze medal – third place	1924 Paris	4×100 m freestyle relay

Wivan Pettersson (24 January 1904 – 7 November 1976) was a Swedish swimmer. She won a bronze medal in the 4 × 100 m freestyle relay at the 1924 Summer Olympics, along with Aina Berg, Gurli Ewerlund and Hjördis Töpel. Individually, she finished fourth in the 200 m breaststroke and failed to reach the 100 m freestyle final. In 1925 she set two Swedish records in the 200 m breaststroke.
