= Constance Jeans =

British swimmer (1899–1984)

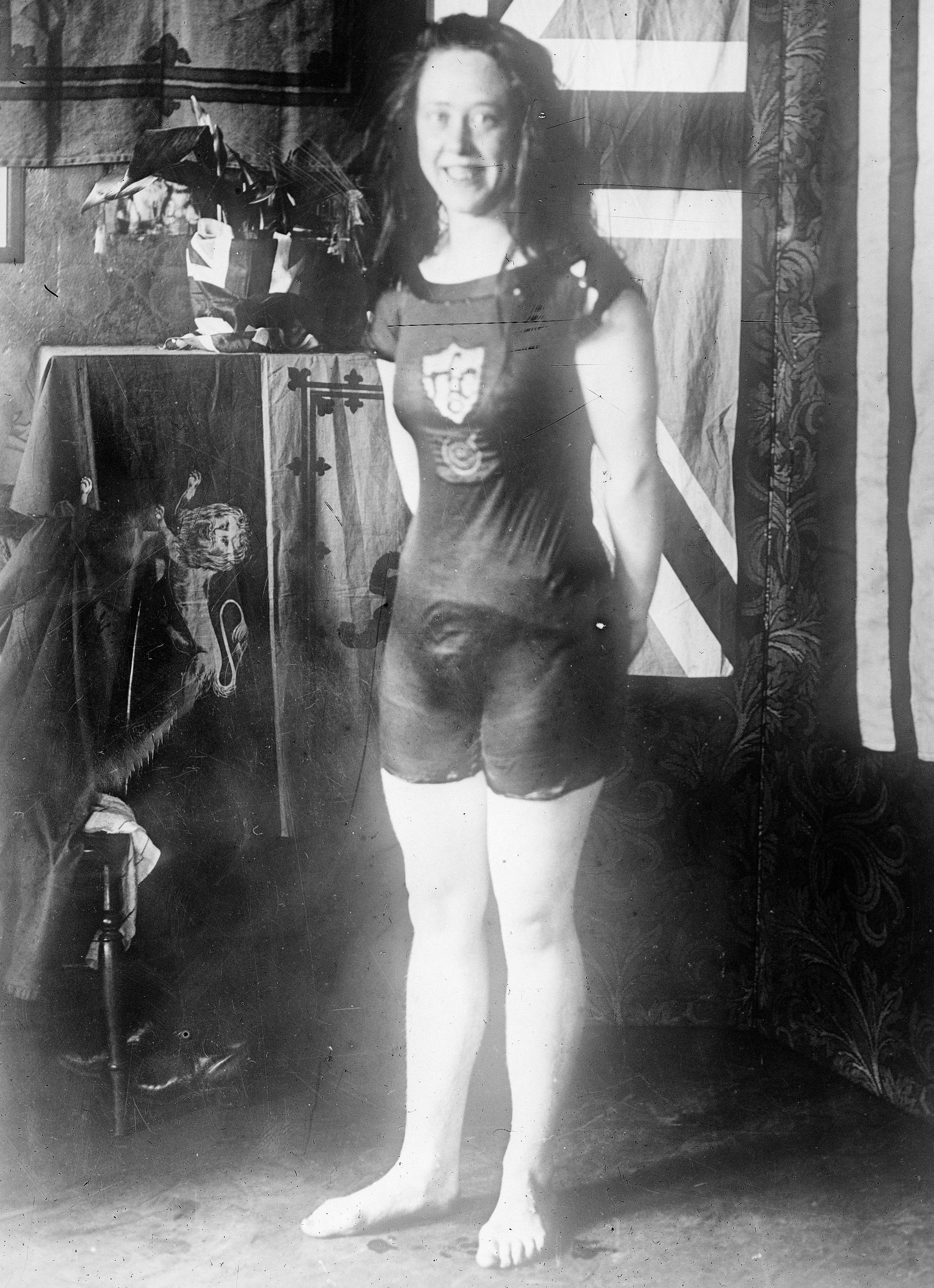
- Jeans in 1919

Personal information
- Full name: Constance Mabel Jeans
- National team: Great Britain
- Born: 23 April 1899 Nottingham, England
- Died: 31 March 1984 (aged 84) Falmouth, England

Sport
- Sport: Swimming
- Strokes: Freestyle
- Club: Nottingham Ladies' SC
Medal record
Women's swimming
Representing Great Britain
Olympic Games
Silver medal – second place	1920 Antwerp	4×100 m freestyle relay
Silver medal – second place	1924 Paris	4×100 m freestyle relay

Constance Mabel Jeans (23 August 1899 – 31 March 1984) was an English competitive swimmer who represented Great Britain in the Olympic Games. She competed in the 100-, 300- and 400-metre individual freestyle events, and the 4×100-metre freestyle relay at the 1920 and 1924 Summer Olympics. She won two silver medals in the relay events at both Olympics and finished fourth in the three individual events.
