= Jane Gylling =

Swedish swimmer

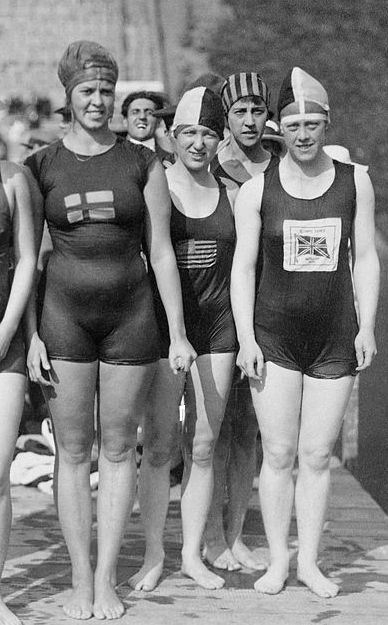
- Jane Gylling (left) at the 1920 Olympics

Personal information
- Born: 6 April 1902 Visby, Sweden
- Died: 10 March 1961 (aged 58) Örgryte, Sweden

Sport
- Sport: Swimming
- Club: SK Najaden
Medal record
Representing Sweden
Olympic Games
Bronze medal – third place	1920 Antwerp	4×100 m freestyle

Jane Hilda Charlotta Gylling (6 April 1902 – 10 March 1961) was a Swedish freestyle swimmer who competed at the 1920 and 1924 Summer Olympics. In 1920 she won a bronze medal in the 4 × 100 m freestyle relay. She finished sixth in the individual 100 m and 300 m events. In 1924, she was eliminated in the 400 m freestyle race preliminaries.
