= Aina Berg =

Swedish swimmer (1902–1992)

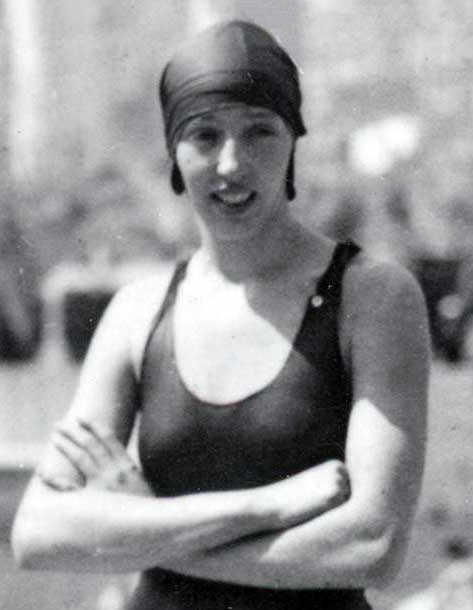

Personal information
- Born: 7 January 1902 Gothenburg, Sweden
- Died: 7 October 1992 (aged 90) Gothenburg, Sweden

Sport
- Sport: Swimming
- Club: SK Najaden, Göteborg
Medal record
Representing Sweden
Olympic Games
Bronze medal – third place	1920 Antwerp	4×100 m freestyle relay
Bronze medal – third place	1924 Paris	4×100 m freestyle relay

Aina Berg (7 January 1902 – 7 October 1992) was a Swedish freestyle swimmer who won bronze medals in the 4 × 100 m freestyle relay at the 1920 and 1924 Summer Olympics. In 1920 she also competed in the individual 100 m and 300 m events, but failed to reach the finals. Berg was the national 100 m champion in 1921–1926 and her national record stood from 1921 until 1932.
