= Deaths in January 1994 =

The following is a list of notable deaths in January 1994.

Entries for each day are listed alphabetically by surname. A typical entry lists information in the following sequence:

- Name, age, country of citizenship at birth, subsequent country of citizenship (if applicable), reason for notability, cause of death (if known), and reference.

== January 1994 ==
=== 1 ===
- William Chappell, 86, British dancer, ballet designer and director.
- Raymond Crotty, 68, Irish economist, writer, and academic.
- Walter Eckhardt, 87, German politician.
- Bill Latham, 86, Australian rules footballer.
- Carlos Nelli, 91, Brazilian Olympic pole vaulter (1932).
- Arthur Porritt, Baron Porritt, 93, New Zealand physician, statesman and Olympic athlete (1924).
- Cesar Romero, 86, American actor (Batman, Ocean's 11, The Thin Man) and activist.
- Peggy Simpson, 80, British actress.
- E. A. Thompson, 79, Irish-British marxist historian.

=== 2 ===
- Jan Ambrus, 94, Slovak-born American fighter pilot.
- Viktor Aristov, 50, Soviet and Russian film director and screenwriter.
- Miguel M. Delgado, 88, Mexican film director and screenwriter, cancer.
- Lys Gauty, 93, French cabaret singer and actress.
- Dixy Lee Ray, 79, American politician.
- Vitālijs Rubenis, 79, Latvian communist politician.
- William Ryan, 72, Irish Fianna Fáil politician.
- Pierre-Paul Schweitzer, 81, French businessman.
- Eddie Smith, 80, American Major League Baseball player (Philadelphia Athletics, Chicago White Sox, Boston Red Sox).

=== 3 ===
- Katharine Elliot, Baroness Elliot of Harwood, 90, British public servant and politician.
- Norman Hepple, 85, English painter, engraver and sculptor, traffic accident.
- Frank Belknap Long, 92, American writer and poet.
- Derna Polazzo, 81, Italian Olympic athlete (1928).
- Marion Ross, 90, Scottish physicist.
- Heather Sears, 58, British actress, multiple organ failure.
- Constantin Vișoianu, 96, Romanian jurist, diplomat, and politician, cancer.

=== 4 ===
- Rahul Dev Burman, 54, Indian music director, cardiovascular disease.
- Reijer Hooykaas, 87, Dutch historian of science.
- Eileen Mayo, 87, English-Australian artist and designer.
- Thirukkuralar V. Munusamy, 80, Indian scholar and politician.
- Heinz Schussig, 67, German footballer.
- Billy Sullivan Jr., 83, American baseball player.
- Willie Wells Jr., 71, American baseball player.

=== 5 ===
- Aldo Baldin, 49, Brazilian opera tenor.
- Sir David Bates, 77, Northern Irish mathematician and physicist.
- Jack Brittin, 69, American baseball player (Philadelphia Phillies).
- Jeanne Carpenter, 76, American child actress of the silent era, pulmonary emphysema.
- Brian Johnston, 81, British cricket commentator, author, and television presenter, heart attack.
- Eliška Junková, 93, Czechoslovak automobile racer.
- Elmar Lipping, 87, Estonian statesman and soldier.
- Franz Murer, 81, Austrian SS officer and war criminal.
- Tip O'Neill, 81, American politician, member of the United States House of Representatives (1953–1987), colorectal cancer.
- Charlie Van Horn, 92, American football player.

=== 6 ===
- Fidel Castaño, 43, Colombian drug lord and paramilitary.
- Oscar Fraley, 79, American sports writer and author.
- Cláudia Magno, 35, Brazilian actress and dancer, AIDS-related complications.
- Per Palle Storm, 83, Danish-Norwegian sculptor and arts professor.
- Adri van Es, 80, Royal Netherlands Navy vice admiral.
- Keith Wells, 31, American convicted murderer, execution by lethal injection.
- Fred Zinner, 90, Belgian Olympic athlete (1924, 1928).

=== 7 ===
- Arthur Dooley, 64, English artist and sculptor.
- Adolf Gruber, 73, Austrian long-distance runner and Olympian (1952, 1956, 1960).
- Charlie McNeil, 57, American gridiron football player (Los Angeles/San Diego Chargers).
- Vittorio Mezzogiorno, 52, Italian actor, cancer.
- Llewellyn Rees, 92, English actor.
- Phoumi Vongvichit, 84, President of Laos.

=== 8 ===
- Hans Asplund, 72, Swedish architect.
- Jay Blackton, 84, American composer and conductor (Oklahoma!, Guys and Dolls).
- Pat Buttram, 78, American actor (Green Acres, Robin Hood, The Fox and the Hound), kidney failure.
- René Faye, 70, French Olympic cyclist (1948).
- Harvey Haddix, 68, American baseball pitcher and pitching coach, pulmonary emphysema.
- Harry Boye Karlsen, 73, Norwegian football player and Olympian (1952).
- Roy Kiyooka, 67, Canadian painter, poet, photographer, and multi-media artist.
- Ruth Osburn, 81, American Olympic discus thrower (1932).
- Chandrashekarendra Saraswati, 99, Indian Hindu religious leader.

=== 9 ===
- Faruk Barlas, 78, Turkish football player and Olympian (1936).
- Luka Ciganović, 78, Yugoslavian Olympic water polo player (1936, 1948).
- Kayhan Kaynak, 33, Turkish football player, heart attack.
- Rigmor Olsen, 86, Danish Olympic swimmer (1928).
- Madge Ryan, 75, Australian actress.
- Johnny Temple, 66, American Major League Baseball player, pancreatic cancer.
- Joachim Werner, 84, German archaeologist.

=== 10 ===
- Michael Aldridge, 73, English actor (Last of the Summer Wine).
- Sven-Erik Bäck, 74, Swedish composer of classical music.
- Ien Dales, 62, Dutch socialist politician and social worker, heart attack.
- Chub Feeney, 72, American baseball executive, heart attack.
- Jean Houdry, 79, French Olympic wrestler (1936).
- Yigal Hurvitz, 75, Israeli politician.
- Girija Kumar Mathur, 75, Indian Hindi writer.
- Bruno Storti, 80, Italian trade unionist and politician.
- Clem Stralka, 80, American gridiron football player (Washington Redskins).
- Roman Tkachuk, 61, Soviet theatre and film actor.
- Miroslav Vejvoda, 61, Czech Olympic sailor (1964, 1972).
- Joe Ware, 80, American baseball player.

=== 11 ===
- Arifin Achmad, 69, Indonesian military officer.
- Les Bollman, 89, Australian rules footballer.
- Walter Driver, 71, Australian cricketer.
- József Háda, 82, Hungarian football player.
- Chester L. Mize, 76, American politician, member of the United States House of Representatives (1965–1971).
- Helmut Poppendick, 92, German physician and SS officer during World War II.
- Ram Ramirez, 80, Puerto Rican born jazz pianist and composer.
- Édouard Rinfret, 88, Canadian politician, member of the House of Commons of Canada (1945–1952).
- Emilio Rosenblueth, 67, Mexican engineer.
- David Ruíz, 81, Chilean footballer.
- Joe Sprinz, 91, American baseball player (Cleveland Indians, St. Louis Cardinals).
- Lucas Turk, 95, American baseball player (Washington Senators).
- Robert Winslow, 77, American gridiron football player and coach.

=== 12 ===
- Samuel Bronston, 85, American film producer, film director, and nephew of communist revolutionary Leon Trotsky, pneumonia.
- Goran Ivandić, 38, Yugoslav drummer, suicide.
- Greg Kabat, 82, American and Canadian football player.
- Gustav Naan, 74, Estonian philosopher and physicist.
- Nehemiah Tamari, 47, Israeli army major general, commander of the Central Command (since 1993), helicopter crash.
- Arthur Turner, 84, English football player and manager.
- John West Wells, 86, American paleontologist, cnidariologist, and geologist.

=== 13 ===
- Hervé Alphand, 86, French diplomat, and French ambassador to the United States.
- Erhard Bauer, 68, German football player.
- Johan Jørgen Holst, 56, Norwegian politician.
- Norm Jacobson, 76, Australian rugby player and coach.
- Jack McGill, 72, Canadian ice hockey player (Boston Bruins).
- Jim Patterson, 74, Australian rules footballer.

=== 14 ===
- Ahmad Ali, 84, Pakistani novelist, poet, diplomat and scholar.
- Chesley William Carter, 91, Canadian politician.
- Martin Corke, 70, English cricketer.
- Yeap Cheng Eng, 79–80, Malayan-Chinese footballer and Olympian (1948).
- Jack Faber, 91, American sports coach and microbiologist.
- Myron Fohr, 81, American racecar driver.
- Ivan Fuqua, 84, American track and field athlete and Olympian (1932).
- Fritz Losigkeit, 80, German flying ace during World War II.
- Federica Montseny, 88, Spanish politician, anarchist, intellectual and writer.
- Esther Ralston, 91, American silent film actress, heart attack.
- Delio Rodríguez, 77, Spanish racing cyclist.
- Nubar Terziyan, 84, Turkish actor.
- George Vico, 70, American baseball player (Detroit Tigers).

=== 15 ===
- Philippe Brun, 85, French trumpeter.
- György Cziffra, 72, Hungarian-French pianist and composer, lung cancer.
- Gabriel-Marie Garrone, 92, French Catholic cardinal.
- Ben H. Guill, 84, American politician, member of the United States House of Representatives (1950–1951).
- Martin Kosleck, 89, German actor.
- Thomas C. McGrath Jr., 66, American politician, member of the United States House of Representatives (1965–1967).
- Agnar Mykle, 78, Norwegian writer and puppeteer.
- Harry Nilsson, 52, American singer-songwriter ("Everybody's Talkin'"), heart failure.
- Don Taylor, 73, Australian rules footballer.
- Harilal Upadhyay, 77, Indian novelist and poet.
- Wally Ware, 87, Australian rules footballer.

=== 16 ===
- Sidon Ebeling, 93, Swedish Olympic long-distance runner (1924).
- Jack Metcalfe, 81, Australian athlete and Olympian (1936).
- Leland Stowe, 94, American journalist and winner of the Pulitzer Prize.
- Pál Szalai, 78, Hungarian police officer who save hundreds of Jews from the Holocaust during World War II.

=== 17 ===
- Al Buchanan, 66, Canadian ice hockey player (Toronto Maple Leafs).
- T. T. Fields, 81, American politician.
- Chung Il-kwon, 76, South Korean general and politician, lymphoma.
- Yevgeny Ivanov, 68, Soviet spy.
- Reamer Keller, 89, American cartoonist.
- Juan Carlos Pugliese, 78, Argentinian lawyer and politician.
- Helen Stephens, 75, American athlete and Olympic champion (1936).
- Robin Turton, Baron Tranmire, 90, British politician.

=== 18 ===
- Arthur Altman, 83, American songwriter.
- Silvio Bergamini, 70, Italian Olympic rower (1952).
- Lee Roy Caffey, 52, American gridiron football player (Green Bay Packers, Chicago Bears, Dallas Cowboys), cancer.
- Frank M. Carpenter, 91, American entomologist and paleontologist, heart attack
- Rosemary Glyde, 45, American musician, cancer.
- Tullik Helsing, 75, Norwegian Olympic diver (1936).
- Tinus Lambillion, 81, Dutch Olympic boxer (1936).
- Rolf Singer, 87, German mycologist.

=== 19 ===
- Eugene Kamenka, 65, Australian political philosopher and scholar.
- Ludvík Kománek, 84, Czech Olympic hurdler (1936) and triple jumper.
- Haik Hovsepian Mehr, 49, Iranian-Armenian Protestant minister, murdered.
- Aubrey Newman, 90, American general and Olympic pentathlete (1928).
- Kenneth Utt, 72, American film producer (The Silence of the Lambs), Oscar winner (1992), bone cancer.
- Joseph Vliers, 61, Belgian football player.

=== 20 ===
- Sir Matt Busby, 84, Scottish football player and manager, cancer.
- Paul Dixon, 86, American baseball player.
- Styrbjörn Holm, 65, Swedish Olympic sailor (1964).
- Ľubor Kresák, 66, Slovak astronomer.
- Bedia Muvahhit, 97, Turkish actress.
- Jaramogi Oginga Odinga, 82, Kenyan chieftain and politician.
- Darío Segovia, 61, Paraguayan football player.

=== 21 ===
- Bassel al-Assad, 31, Syrian colonel, politician and son of president Hafez al-Assad, traffic collision.
- Andrejs Kapmals, 104, Latvian Olympic long-distance runner (1912).
- Timo Suviranta, 63, Finnish Olympic basketball player (1952).
- Tony Waddington, 69, English football manager
- Bill Young, 79, American gridiron football player (Washington Redskins), and coach.

=== 22 ===
- Vincent Allard, 72, Belgian entomologist.
- Jean-Louis Barrault, 83, French actor, director and mime artist, heart attack.
- Graziano Battistini, 57, Italian road bicycle racer.
- Rhett Forrester, 37, American rock singer and musician (Riot), shot during carjacking.
- Frances Gifford, 73, American actress, pulmonary emphysema.
- Rudy Miller, 93, American baseball player (Philadelphia Athletics).
- Telly Savalas, 72, American actor (Kojak, On Her Majesty's Secret Service, Birdman of Alcatraz) and singer, Emmy winner (1974), cancer.

=== 23 ===
- Adolph Baller, 84, Austrian-American pianist, kidney failure.
- Lee Alvin DuBridge, 92, American educator and physicist, pneumonia.
- Klaus Hemmerle, 64, German Roman Catholic bishop, cancer.
- Takashi Kondo, 82, Japanese Olympic gymnast (1932).
- Stan Landes, 70, American baseball umpire.
- Alexei Mozhaev, 75, Soviet and Russian painter, graphic artist, and art teacher.
- Yngve Nordwall, 85, Swedish film actor and director.
- Nikolai Ogarkov, 76, Soviet military officer and Hero of the Soviet Union.
- Eila Pennanen, 77, Finnish writer, critic, and essayist.
- Brian Redhead, 64, British author, journalist and broadcaster.
- Millie Robinson, 69, Manx racing cyclist and world hour record holder.
- Oliver Smith, 75, American scenic designer and interior designer, pulmonary emphysema.
- Walter Youell, 84, South African Olympic rower (1936).

=== 24 ===
- Sidney Quinn Curtiss, 76, American politician.
- Klaus Eichler, 54, German sporting official, plane crash.
- Raymond F. Jones, 78, American science fiction author.
- Yves Navarre, 53, French writer, suicide.
- Helge Vatsend, 65, Norwegian poet and novelist.
- Paul X. Williams, 85, American district judge (United States District Court for the Western District of Arkansas).

=== 25 ===
- James Boyce, 46, British politician, heart attack.
- Pat Crawford, 91, American Major League Baseball player (New York Giants, Cincinnati Reds, St. Louis Cardinals).
- Aida McAnn Flemming, 97, Canadian teacher, writer and animal rights advocate.
- Stephen Cole Kleene, 85, American mathematician.
- James Zachery, 35, American gridiron football player, murdered.

=== 26 ===
- Ales Adamovich, 66, Soviet and Belarusian writer, critic, and academic, heart attack.
- Elsa Andersson, 99, Swedish Olympic diver (1912).
- Lejaren Hiller, 69, American composer, Alzheimer's disease.
- Ivan Warner, 74, American lawyer and politician, cancer.

=== 27 ===
- Stanley Adams, 86, American lyricist and songwriter, cancer.
- Claude Akins, 67, American actor (B. J. and the Bear, Inherit the Wind, The Caine Mutiny), cancer.
- Bob Bjorklund, 75, American football player (Philadelphia Eagles).
- Eddie Calhoun, 72, American jazz double bassist.
- Alain Daniélou, 86, French historian, musicologist, and indologist.
- Sherm Feller, 75, American musical composer and radio personality.
- Hans H. Gattermann, 62, German politician and member of the Bundestag.
- Sergei Scherbakov, 75, Russian welterweight boxer and Olympian (1952).
- Don Smith, 83, American basketball player.
- Frank Twiss, 83, British Royal Navy admiral.
- Boris Vorontsov-Velyaminov, 89, Russian astrophysicist.

=== 28 ===
- Emily Taft Douglas, 94, American politician, member of the United States House of Representatives (1945–1947).
- Betty Go-Belmonte, 60, Filipina journalist and newspaper publisher.
- Otto Gordziałkowski, 95, Polish Olympic rower (1928).
- Frank Hardy, 76, Australian novelist and writer, heart attack.
- William Levitt, 86, American real-estate developer regarded as the father of modern American suburbia.
- Stefan Maurer, 33, Swiss Olympic cyclist (1984).
- George Rosso, 64, American gridiron football player (Washington Redskins).
- Hal Smith, 77, American actor (The Andy Griffith Show, The Many Adventures of Winnie the Pooh, Beauty and the Beast), heart attack.

=== 29 ===
- Marguerite Allan, 88, Russian-born British actress.
- Bob Bibby, 68, Australian rules footballer.
- Nick Cravat, 82, American actor and stunt performer, cancer, lung cancer.
- Yevgeny Leonov, 67, Soviet and Russian actor, pulmonary embolism.
- Ulrike Maier, 26, Austrian alpine ski racer, World Champion and Olympian (1988, 1992), skiing accident.
- Tollien Schuurman, 81, Dutch sprinter and Olympian (1932).
- Jakobína Sigurðardóttir, 75, Icelandic writer.
- Jakob Vaage, 88, Norwegian educator, author and historian.

=== 30 ===
- Pierre Boulle, 81, French novelist.
- Väinö Järvenpää, 60, Finnish Olympic wrestler (1960).
- Claude Nigon, 65, French fencer and Olympian (1952, 1956).
- Oswald Phipps, 4th Marquess of Normanby, 81, British peer and philanthropist.
- Laura Nucci, 80, Italian film actress.
- Jan Schaefer, 53, Dutch politician and community organiser, diabetes.
- Rudolf Schwarz, 88, Austrian-American conductor.
- Bahjat Talhouni, 81, Jordanian politician.
- Don Turnbull, 84, Australian tennis player.

=== 31 ===
- Master Abdullah, 64, Pakistani film music composer.
- Alan Anton, 61, Australian rules footballer.
- Dieudonné Devrindt, 82, Belgian Olympic sprinter (1936).
- Arnolds Krūkliņš, 79, Latvian racewalker and Olympian (1936).
- Mary Meijer-van der Sluis, 76, Dutch fencer and Olympian (1948).
- Alberto Sorrentino, 77, Italian film actor.
- Erwin Strittmatter, 81, German writer.
- Tomanija Đuričko, 79, Serbian actress.
