= Brutalist architecture =

Architectural style

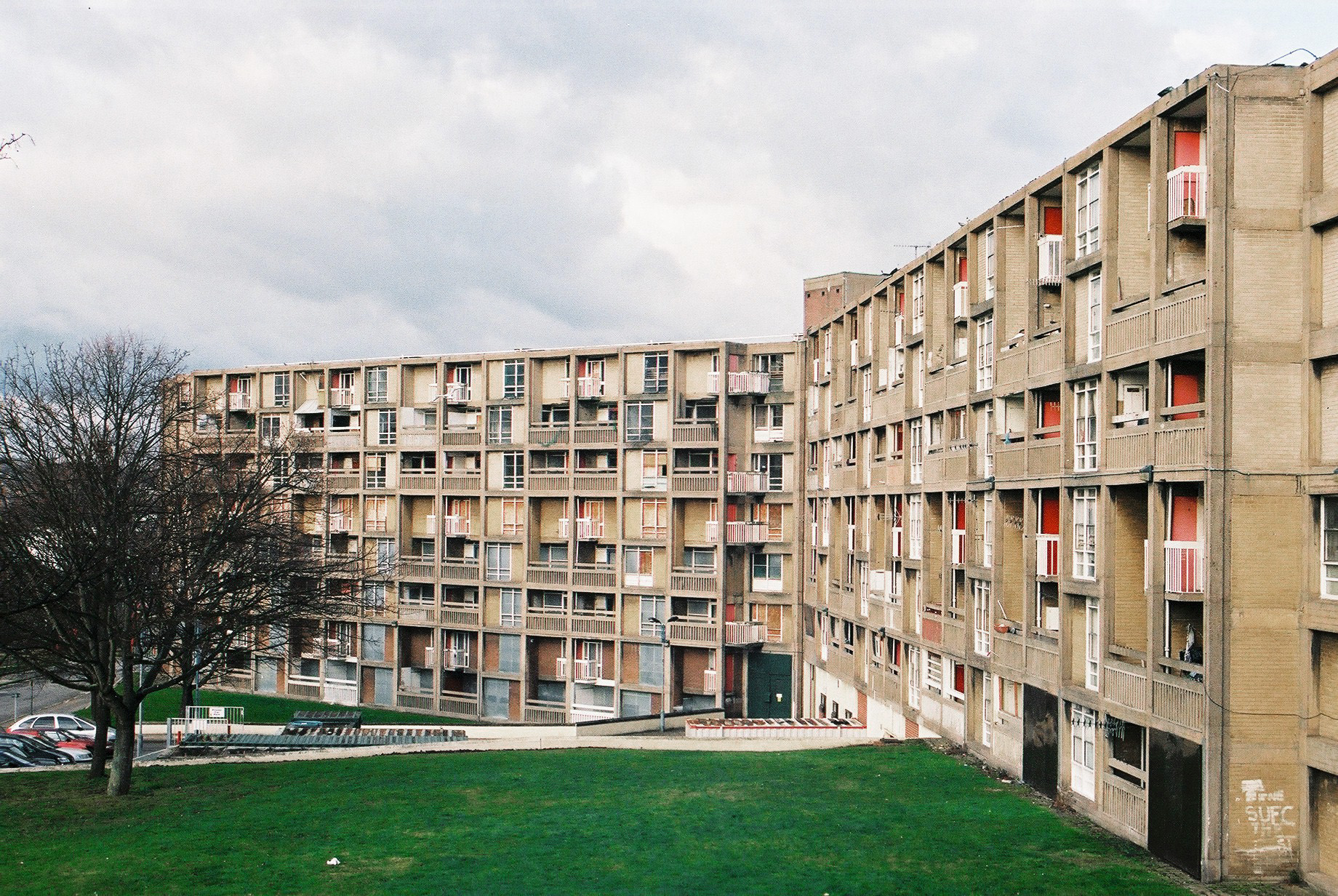
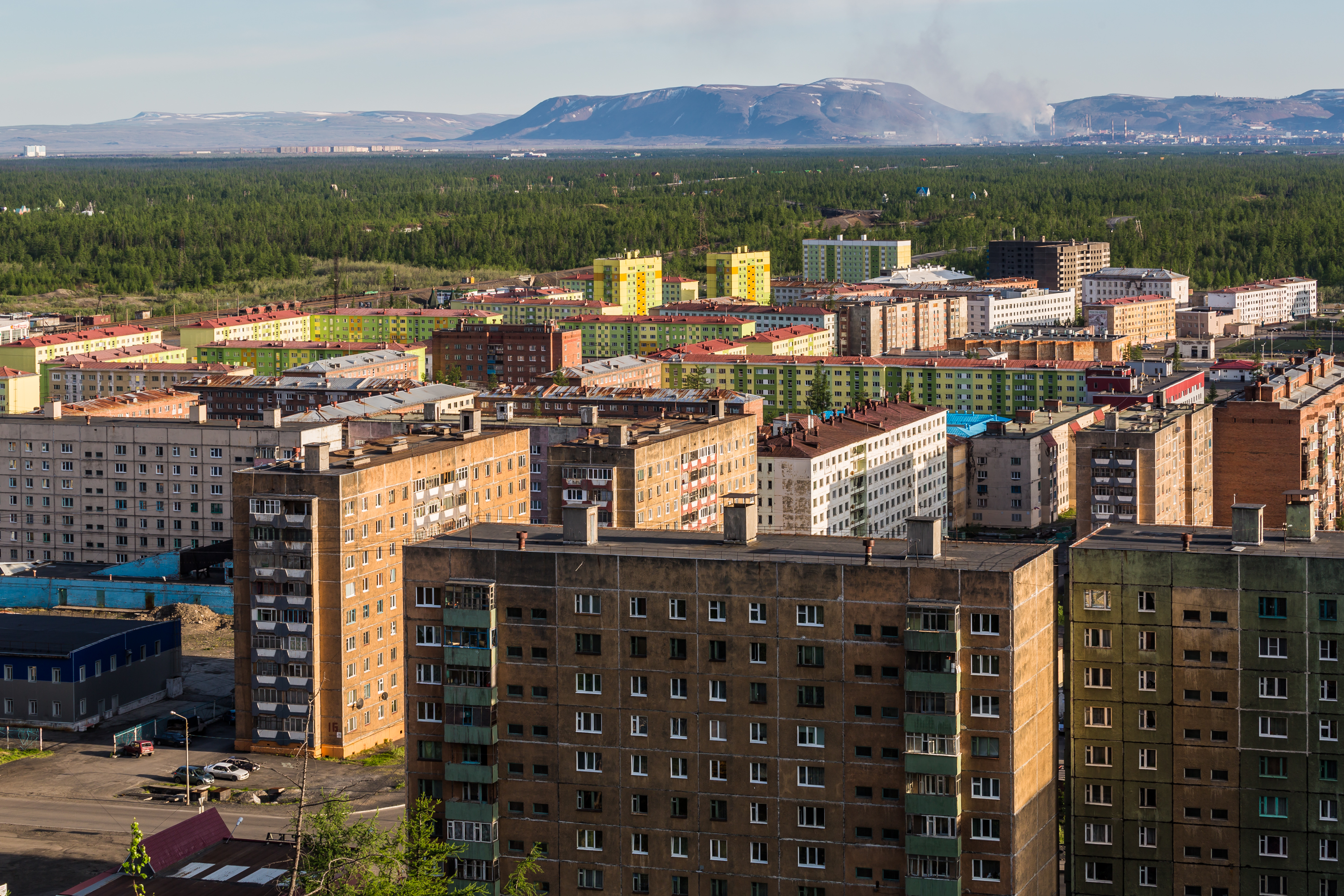
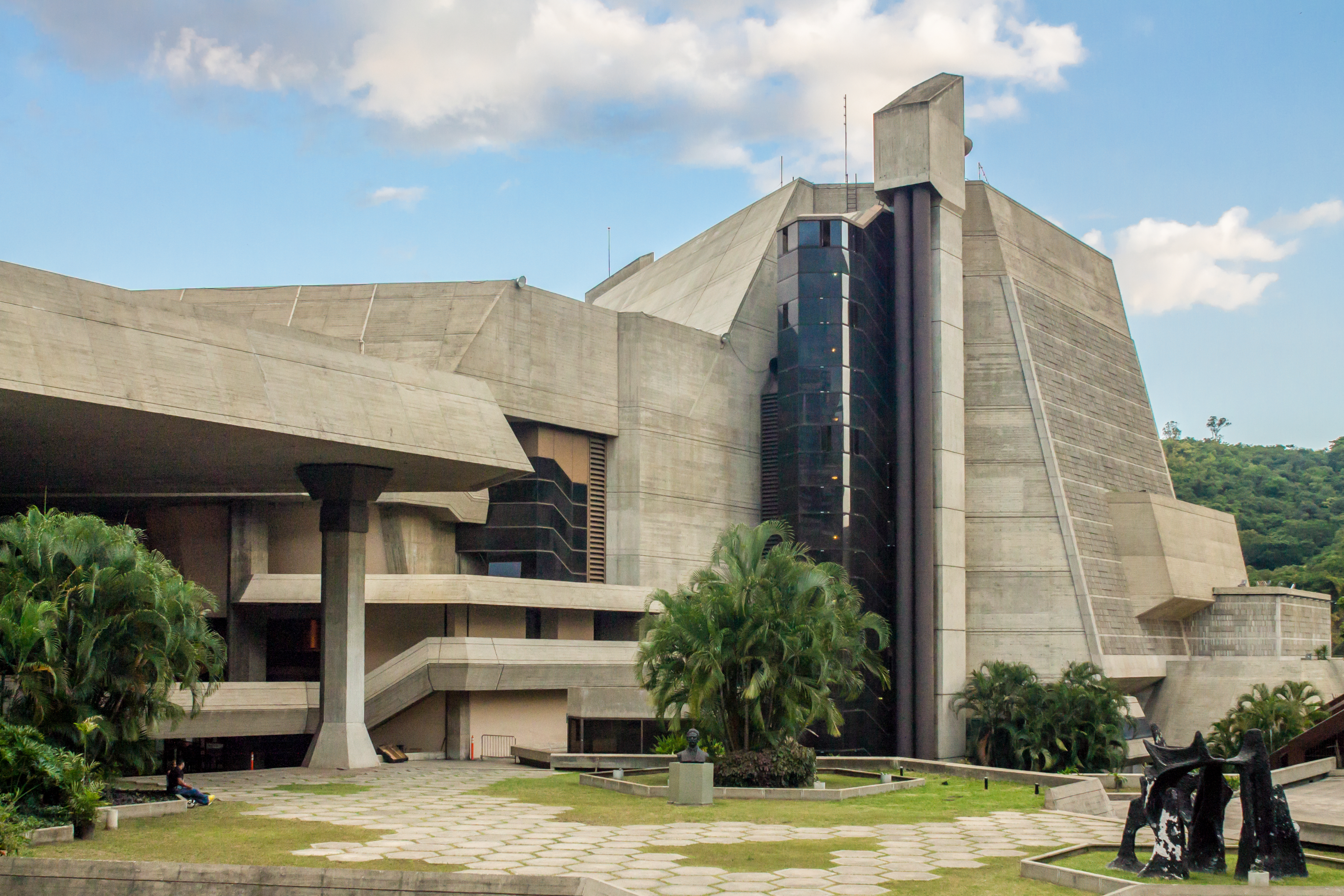
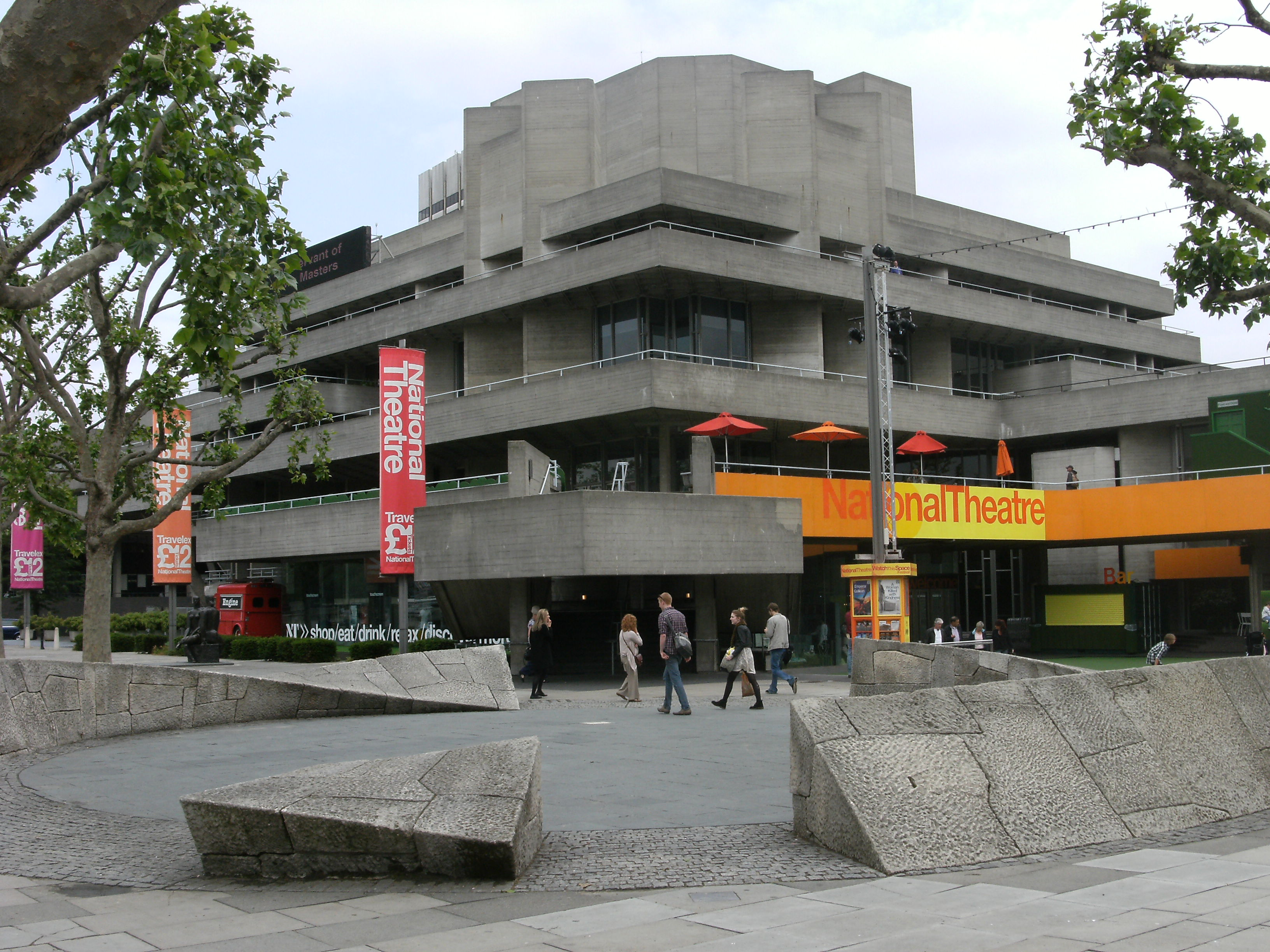
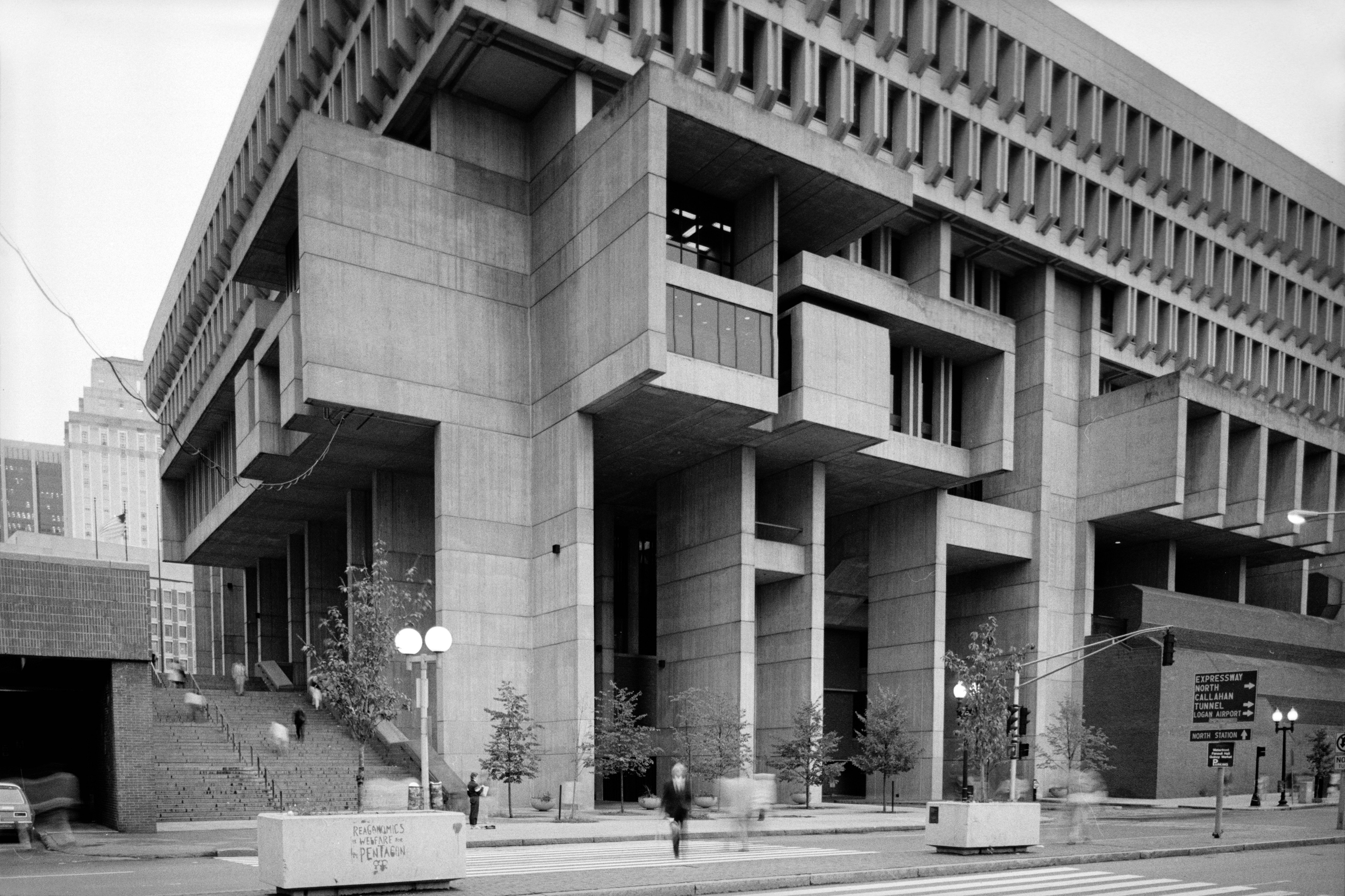
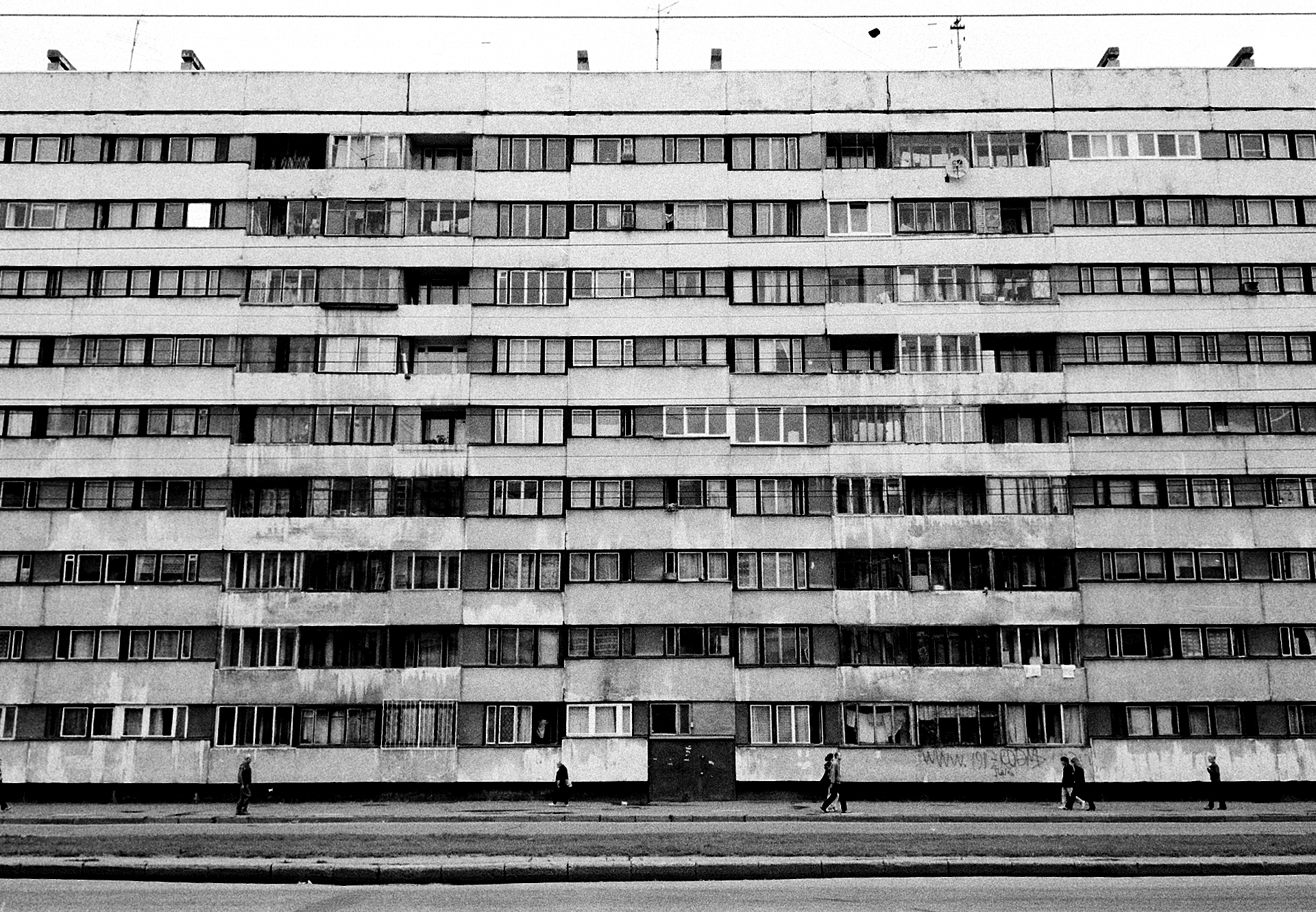
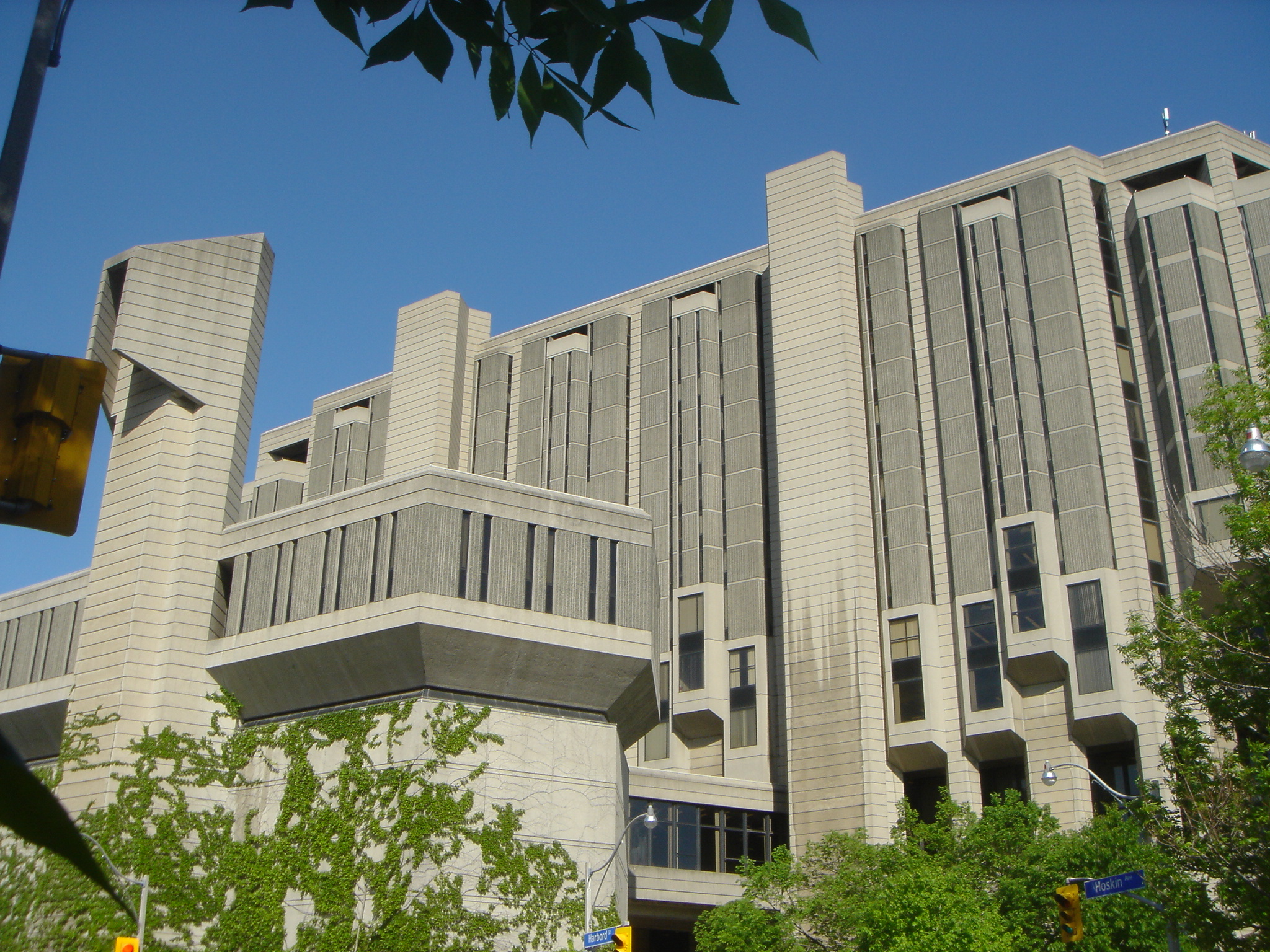
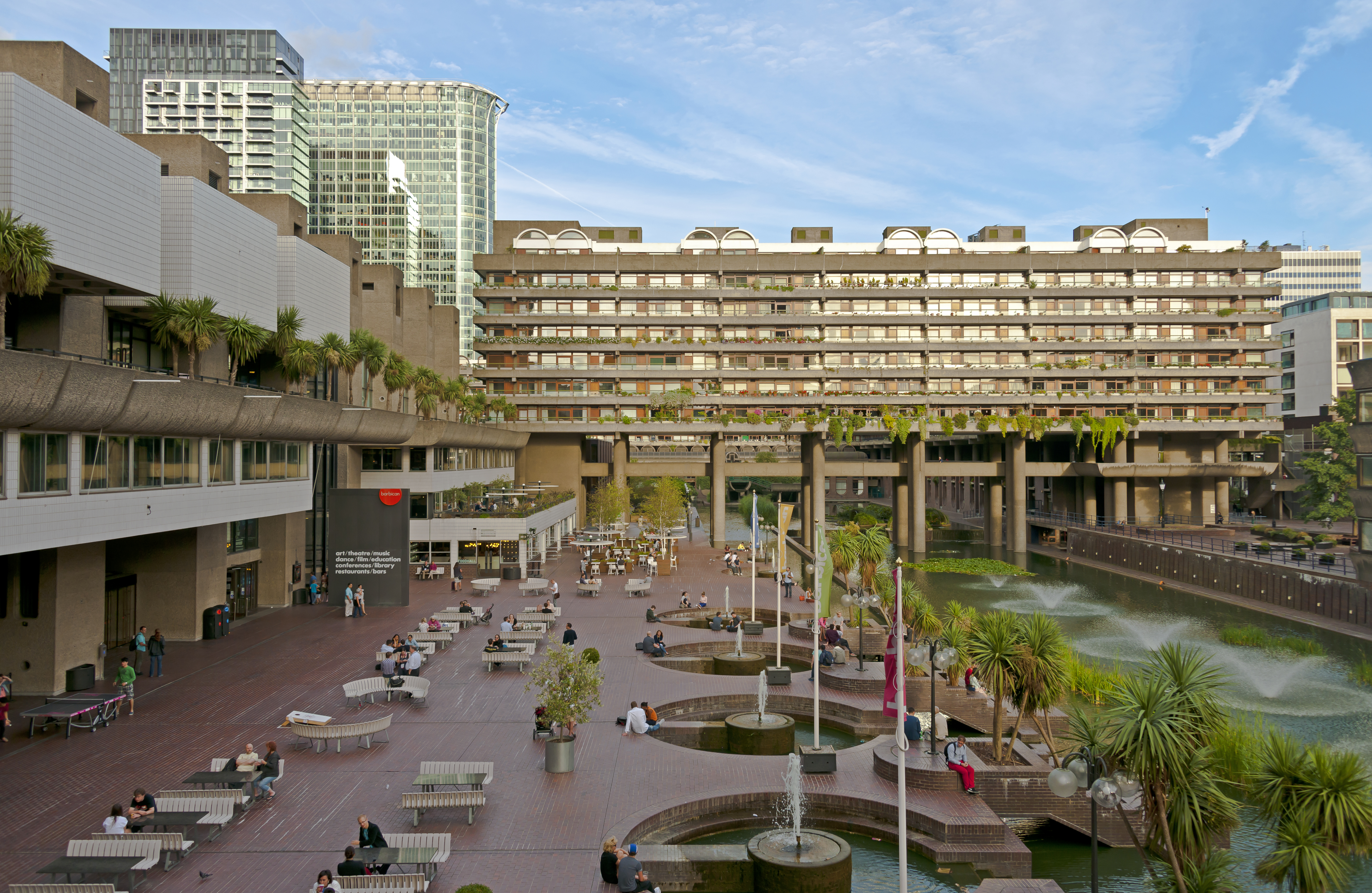
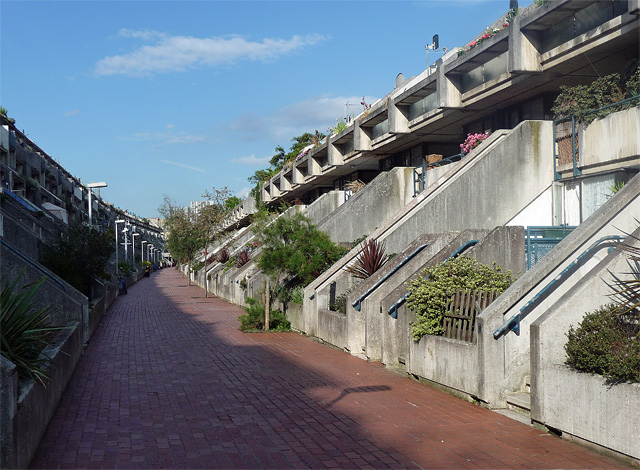
- Top row: Park Hill flats in Sheffield, England; Soviet-era housing in Talnakh, Russia; Teresa Carreño Cultural Complex in Caracas, Venezuela. Middle row: Royal National Theatre in London; Boston City Hall; Soviet-era housing in Saint Petersburg. Bottom row: Robarts Library in Toronto, Canada; Barbican Centre in the City of London; Alexandra Road Estate in London.

Additional media
- Years active: 1950s – early 1980s
- Location: United Kingdom (progenitally)

Brutalist architecture is an architectural style that emerged during the 1950s in the United Kingdom, among the reconstruction projects of the post-war era. Brutalist buildings are known for minimalist construction showcasing the bare building materials and structural elements over decorative design. The style commonly makes use of exposed, unpainted concrete or brick, angular geometric shapes and a predominantly monochrome colour palette; other materials, such as steel, timber, and glass, are also featured.

Descended from modernism, brutalism is said to be a reaction against the nostalgia of architecture in the 1940s. Derived from the Swedish word nybrutalism, the term "new brutalism" was first used by British architects Alison and Peter Smithson for their pioneering approach to design. The style was further popularised in a 1955 essay by architectural critic Reyner Banham, who also associated the movement with the French phrases béton brut ("raw concrete") and art brut ("raw art"). The style, as developed by architects such as the Smithsons, Hungarian-born Ernő Goldfinger, and the British firm Chamberlin, Powell & Bon, was partly foreshadowed by the modernist work of other architects such as French-Swiss Le Corbusier, Estonian-American Louis Kahn, German-American Ludwig Mies van der Rohe, and Finnish Alvar Aalto.

In the United Kingdom, brutalism was featured in the design of utilitarian, low-cost social housing influenced by socialist principles and soon spread to other regions around the world, while being echoed by similar styles like in Eastern Europe. Brutalist designs became most commonly used in the design of institutional buildings, such as provincial legislatures, public works projects, universities, libraries, courts, and city halls. The popularity of the movement began to decline in the late 1970s, with some associating the style with urban decay and totalitarianism. Brutalism's popularity in socialist and communist nations owed to traditional styles being associated with the bourgeoisie, whereas concrete emphasized equality.

Brutalism has been polarising historically; specific buildings, as well as the movement as a whole, have drawn a range of criticism (often being described as "cold"). There are often public-led campaigns to demolish brutalist buildings. Some people are favourable to the style, and in the United Kingdom some buildings have been preserved.

== History ==
=== Terminology ===
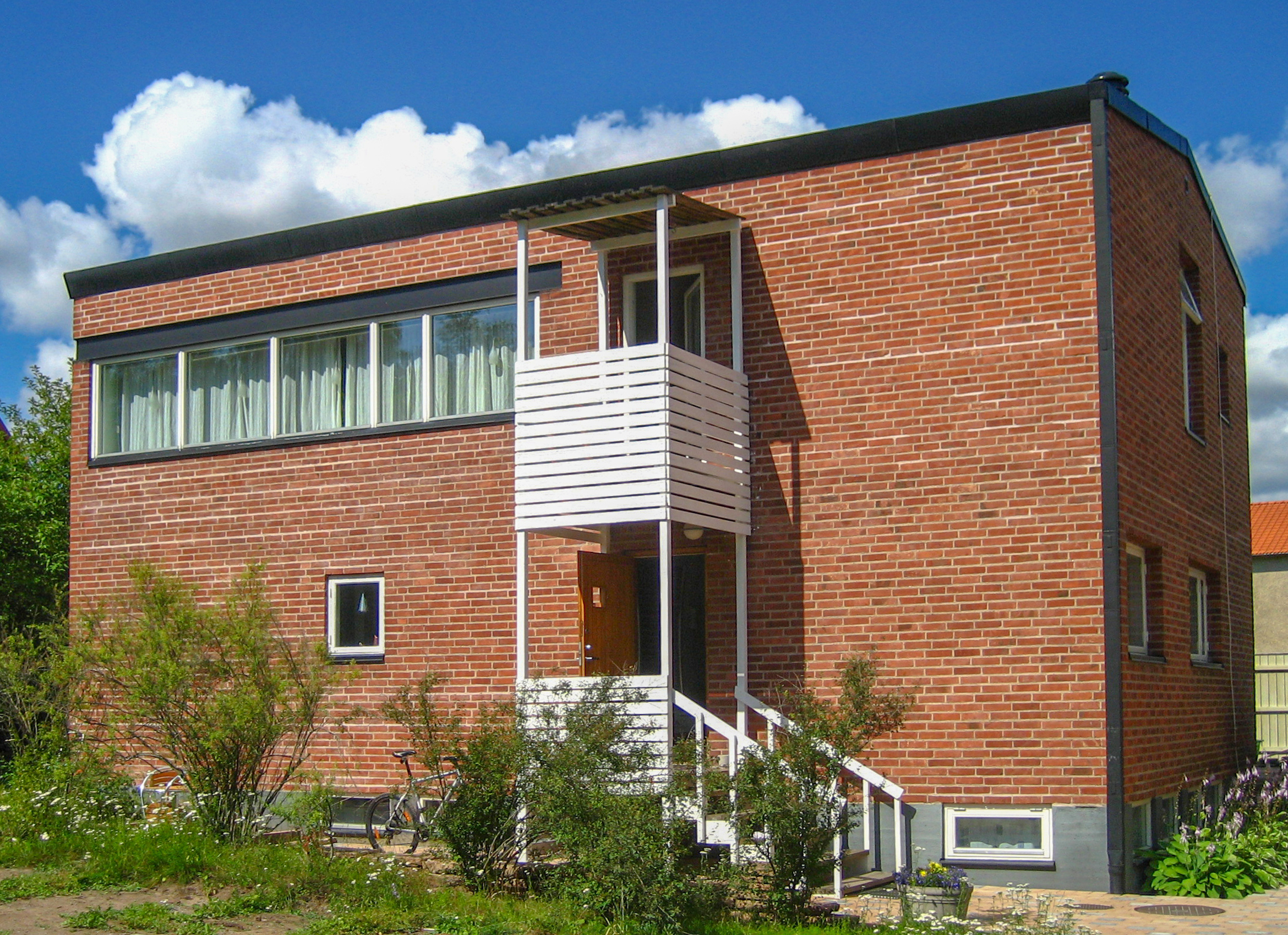
Villa Göth (1950) in Kåbo, Uppsala, Sweden. "New brutalism" was used for the first time to describe this house

The term nybrutalism (new brutalism) was coined by the Swedish architect Hans Asplund to describe Villa Göth, a modern brick home in Uppsala, designed in January 1950 by his contemporaries Bengt Edman and Lennart Holm. Showcasing the "as found" design approach that would later be at the core of brutalism, the house displays visible I-beams over windows, exposed brick inside and out, and poured concrete in several rooms where the tongue-and-groove pattern of the boards used to build the forms can be seen. The term was picked up in the summer of 1950 by a group of visiting English architects, including Michael Ventris, Oliver Cox, and Graeme Shankland, where it apparently "spread like wildfire, and [was] subsequently adopted by a certain faction of young British architects".

The Hunstanton School (1954) by Alison and Peter Smithson is the first building to be called "new brutalist" by its architects

=== Movement ===
The first published usage of the phrase "new brutalism" occurred in 1953, when Alison Smithson used it to describe a plan for their unbuilt Soho house which appeared in the November issue of Architectural Design. She further stated: "It is our intention in this building to have the structure exposed entirely, without interior finishes wherever practicable." The Smithsons' Hunstanton School completed in 1954 in Norfolk, and the Sugden House completed in 1955 in Watford, represent the earliest examples of new brutalism in the United Kingdom. Hunstanton school, likely inspired by Mies van der Rohe's 1946 Alumni Memorial Hall at the Illinois Institute of Technology in Chicago, United States, is notable as the first completed building in the world to carry the title of "new brutalist" by its architects. At the time, it was described as "the most truly modern building in England".

The term gained increasingly wider recognition when British architectural historian Reyner Banham used it to identify both an ethic and aesthetic style, in his 1955 essay The New Brutalism. In the essay, Banham described Hunstanton and the Soho house as the "reference by which The New Brutalism in architecture may be defined". Reyner Banham also associated the term "new brutalism" with art brut and béton brut, meaning "raw concrete" in French, for the first time. The best-known béton brut architecture is the proto-brutalist work of the Swiss-French architect Le Corbusier, in particular his 1952 Unité d'habitation in Marseille, France; the 1951–1961 Chandigarh Capitol Complex in India; and the 1955 church of Notre Dame du Haut in Ronchamp, France.

Banham further expanded his thoughts in the 1966 book The New Brutalism: Ethic or Aesthetic? to characterise a somewhat recently established cluster of architectural approaches, particularly in Europe. In the book, Banham says that Le Corbusier's concrete work was a source of inspiration and helped popularise the movement, suggesting "if there is one single verbal formula that has made the concept of Brutalism admissible in most of the world's Western languages, it is that Le Corbusier himself described that concrete work as 'béton-brut'". He further states that "the words 'The New Brutalism' were already circulating, and had acquired some depth of meaning through things said and done, over and above the widely recognised connection with béton brut. The phrase still 'belonged' to the Smithsons, however, and it was their activities above all others that were giving distinctive qualities to the concept of Brutalism."

== Motif ==
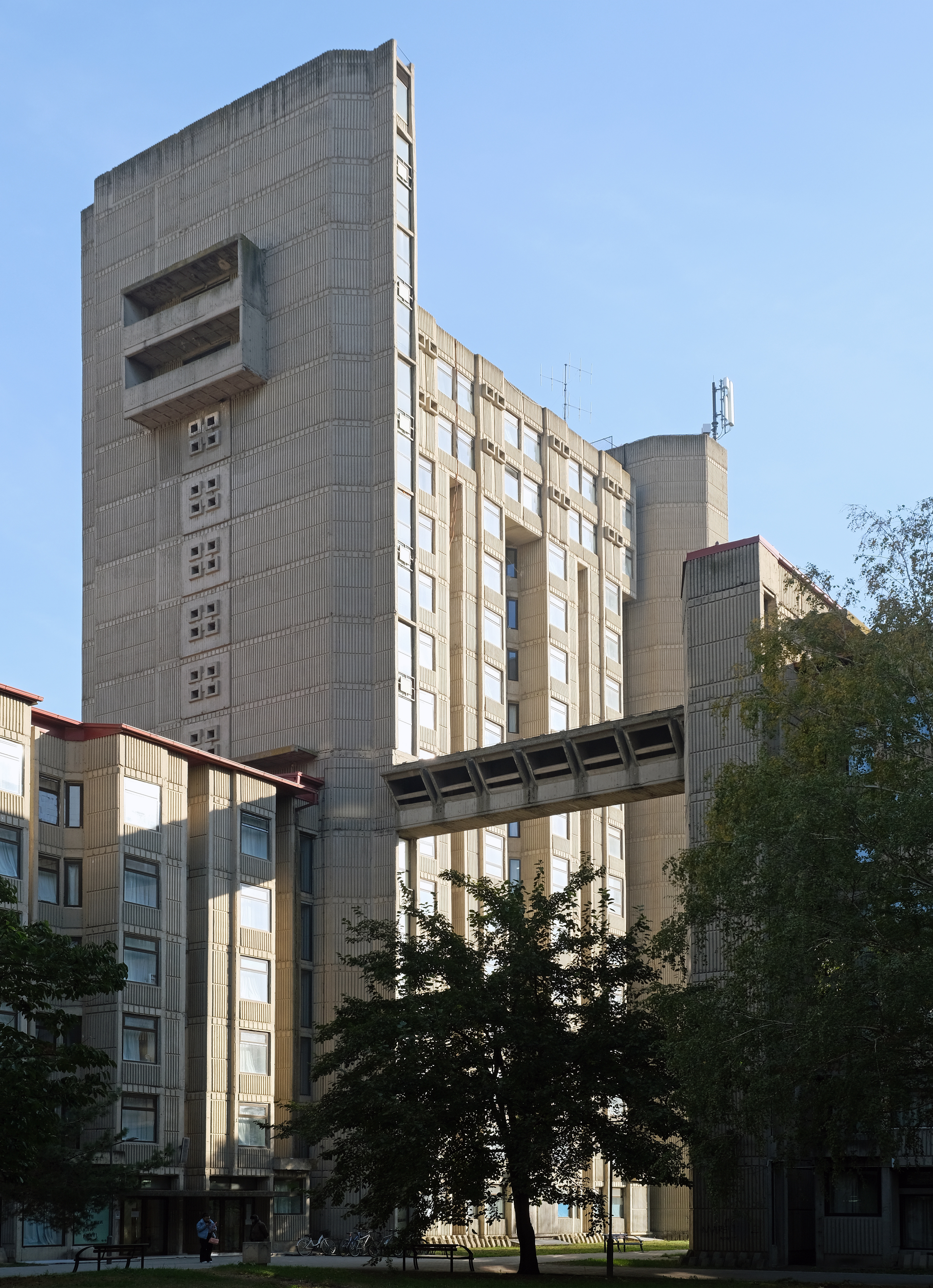
Student dormitory (1971) by Georgi Konstantinovski in Skopje, North Macedonia

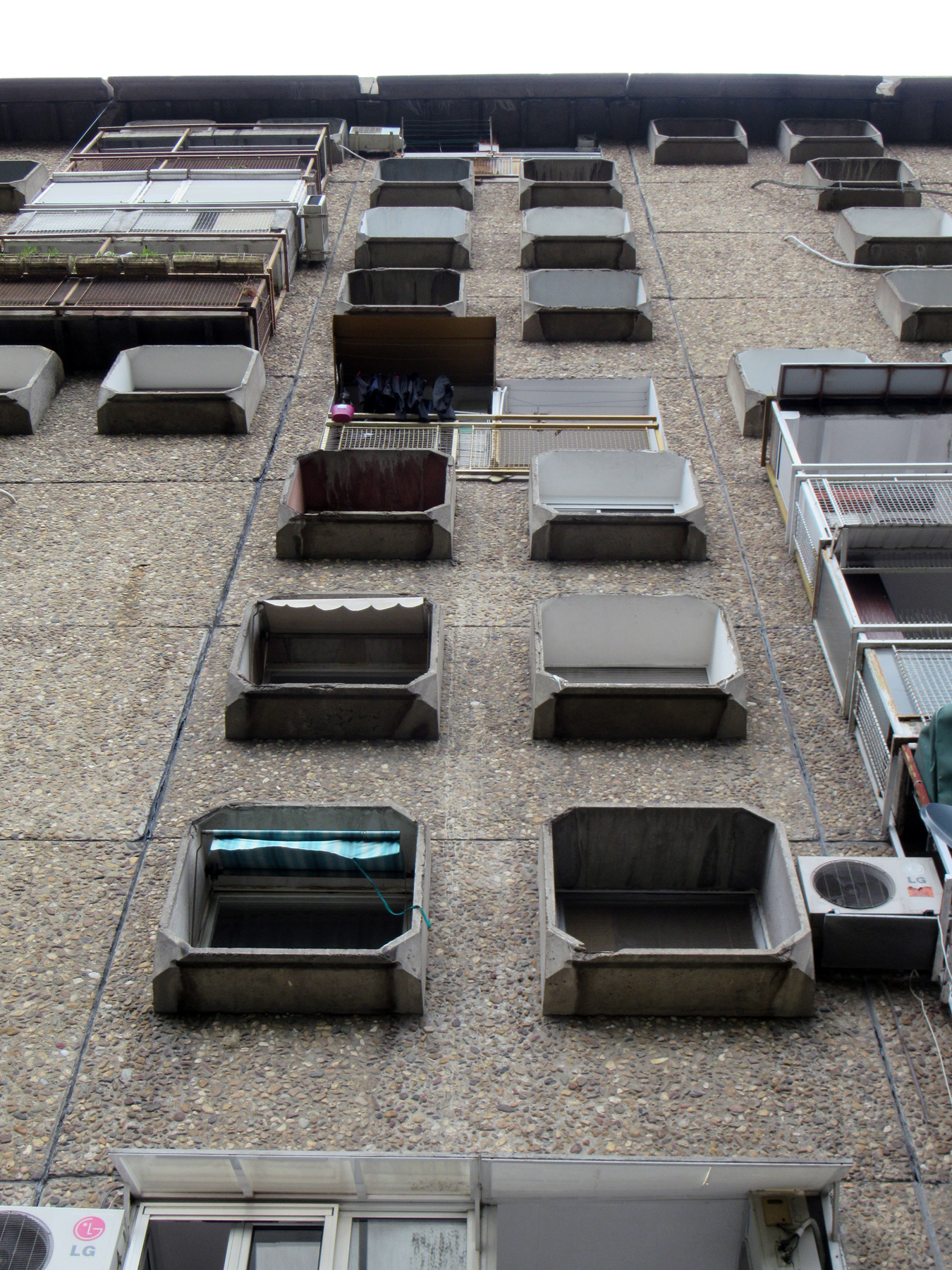
"TV buildings" named for the concrete window frames that resemble TV screens (Belgrade, Serbia)

New brutalism is not only an architectural style; it is also a philosophical approach to architectural design, a striving to create simple, honest, and functional buildings that accommodate their purpose, inhabitants, and location. Stylistically, brutalism is a strict, modernistic design language that has been said to be a reaction to the architecture of the 1940s, much of which was characterised by a retrospective nostalgia. Peter Smithson believed that the core of brutalism was a reverence for materials, expressed honestly, stating that "Brutalism is not concerned with the material as such but rather the quality of material", and "the seeing of materials for what they were: the woodness of the wood; the sandiness of sand". Architect John Voelcker said that the "new brutalism" in architecture "cannot be understood through stylistic analysis, although some day a comprehensible style might emerge", supporting the Smithsons' description of the movement as "an ethic, not an aesthetic".

Reyner Banham felt that the phrase "the new brutalism" existed as both an attitude toward design and a descriptive label for the architecture itself and that it "eludes precise description, while remaining a living force". He attempted to codify the movement in systematic language, insisting that a brutalist structure must satisfy the following terms: "1, Formal legibility of plan; 2, clear exhibition of structure, and 3, valuation of materials for their inherent qualities 'as found'." Also important was the aesthetic "image", or "coherence of the building as a visual entity".

Brutalist buildings are usually constructed with recurring modular elements representing specific functional zones, distinctly articulated and grouped together into a unified whole. There is often an emphasis on graphic expressions in the external elevations and in the whole-site architectural plan in regard to the main functions and people-flows of the buildings. Buildings may use materials such as concrete, brick, glass, steel, timber, rough-hewn stone, and gabions among others. However, due to its low cost, raw concrete is often used and left to reveal the basic nature of its construction with rough surfaces featuring wood "shuttering" produced when the forms were cast in situ. Examples are frequently massive in character (even when not large) and challenge traditional notions of what a building should look like with focus given to interior spaces as much as exterior.

A common theme in brutalist designs is the exposure of the building's inner-workings—ranging from their structure and services to their human use—in the exterior of the building. In the Boston City Hall, designed in 1962, the strikingly different and projected portions of the building indicate the special nature of the rooms behind those walls, such as the mayor's office or the city council chambers. From another perspective, the design of the Hunstanton School included placing the facility's water tank, normally a hidden service feature, in a prominent, visible tower. Rather than being hidden in the walls, Hunstanton's water and electric utilities were delivered via readily visible pipes and conduits.

Brutalism as an architectural philosophy was often associated with a socialist utopian ideology, which tended to be supported by its designers, especially by Alison and Peter Smithson, near the height of the style. Indeed, their work sought to emphasize functionality and to connect architecture with what they viewed as the realities of modern life. Among their early contributions were "streets in the sky" in which traffic and pedestrian circulation were rigorously separated, another theme popular in the 1960s. This style had a strong position in the architecture of European communist countries from the mid-1960s to the late 1980s (Bulgaria, Czechoslovakia, East Germany, USSR, Yugoslavia). In Czechoslovakia, brutalism was presented as an attempt to create a "national" but also "modern socialist" architectural style. Such prefabricated socialist era buildings are called panelaky.

A sub-genre of brutalism is "brick brutalism" or "brickalism", where the dominant structural material is brick rather than concrete. Examples range from the Smithson's house in Soho (1952) to Colin St John Wilson's British Library (1982–1998).

== Designers ==
=== United Kingdom ===
In the United Kingdom, architects associated with the brutalist style include the wife-and-husband team of Alison and Peter Smithson, who pioneered the style, Ernő Goldfinger, some of the work of Sir Basil Spence, the London County Council/Greater London Council Architects Department, Owen Luder, John Bancroft, Norman Engleback, who designed the Hayward Gallery, and, arguably perhaps, Sir Denys Lasdun, whose work included the brutalist National Theatre, Sir Leslie Martin, Sir James Stirling and James Gowan with their early works. Partnerships included Chamberlin, Powell and Bon, who designed the Barbican Centre.

=== United States ===
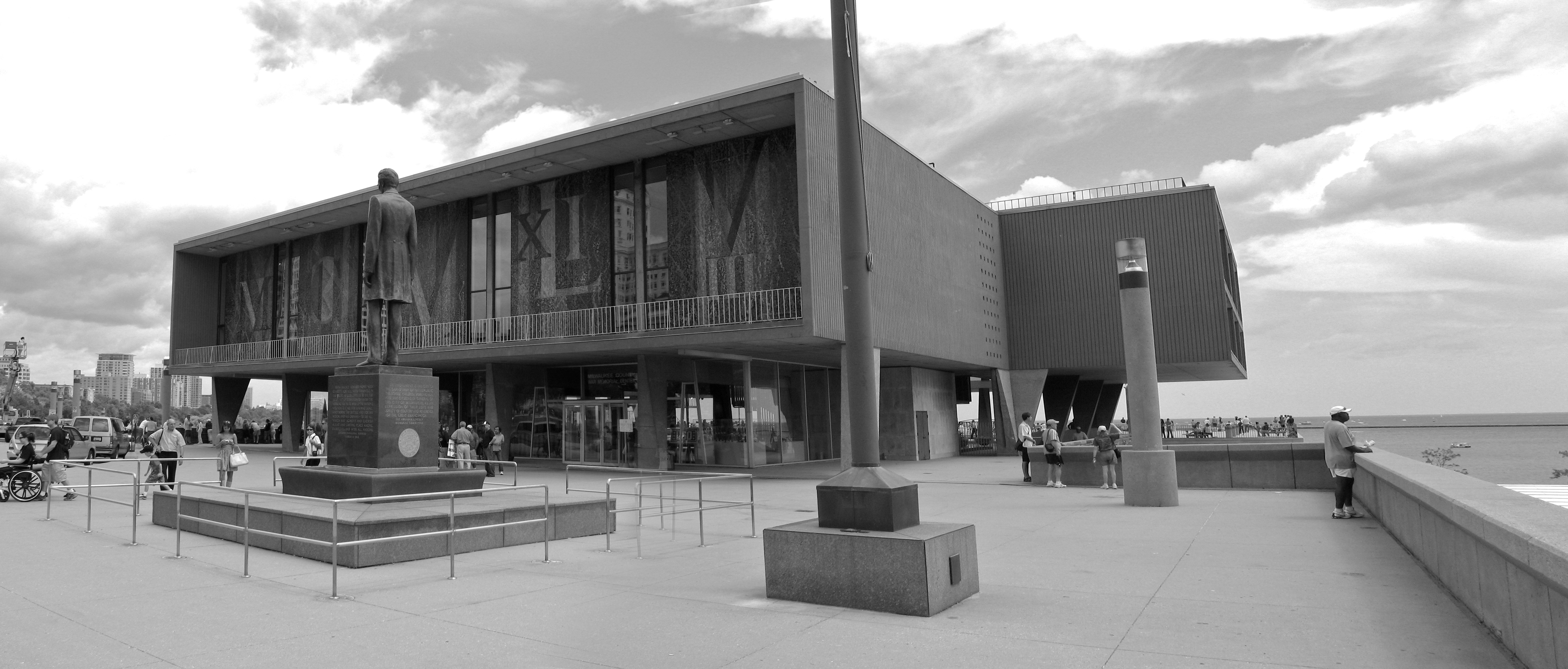
The Milwaukee County War Memorial (1957) is an example of the brutalist architecture of Eero Saarinen.

Evans Woollen III is credited for introducing the Brutalist and Modernist architecture styles to Indianapolis, Indiana. Walter Netsch is known for his brutalist academic buildings. Marcel Breuer was known for his "soft" approach to the style, often using curves rather than corners. In Atlanta, Georgia, the architectural style was introduced to Buckhead's affluent Peachtree Road with the Ted Levy-designed Plaza Towers and Park Place on Peachtree condominiums. Architectural historian William Jordy said that although Louis Kahn was "[o]pposed to what he regarded as the muscular posturing of most Brutalism", some of his work "was surely informed by some of the same ideas that came to momentary focus in the brutalist position".

=== Australia ===
In Australia, architects working in the brutalist style included Robin Gibson, designer of the Queensland Art Gallery, Ken Woolley, designer of the Fisher Library at the University of Sydney, Christopher Kringas, who built the High Court of Australia Building. John Andrews's government and institutional structures in Australia also exhibit the style. Daryl Jackson and Kevin Borland designed one of the first brutalist buildings in Melbourne, the Harold Holt Memorial Swimming Centre in Malvern, in 1967.

=== Canada ===
Vancouver-based architect Arthur Erickson was responsible for several notable brutalist developments including Simon Fraser University's main campus building, the MacMillan Bloedel Building, the Museum of Anthropology at the University of British Columbia and the Vancouver Law Courts.

The city of Winnipeg is noted for significant contributions to brutalist archiecture in Canada, including the Winnipeg Civic Centre (City Hall and Administrative Building) (1962–1963, Green Blankstein Russell) as well as the University of Manitoba Students' Union Building (1966–1969) and Royal Manitoba Theatre Centre (1969–1970), both by Waisman Ross Blankstein Coop Gillmor Hanna (now Number Ten Architectural Group).

=== Argentina ===
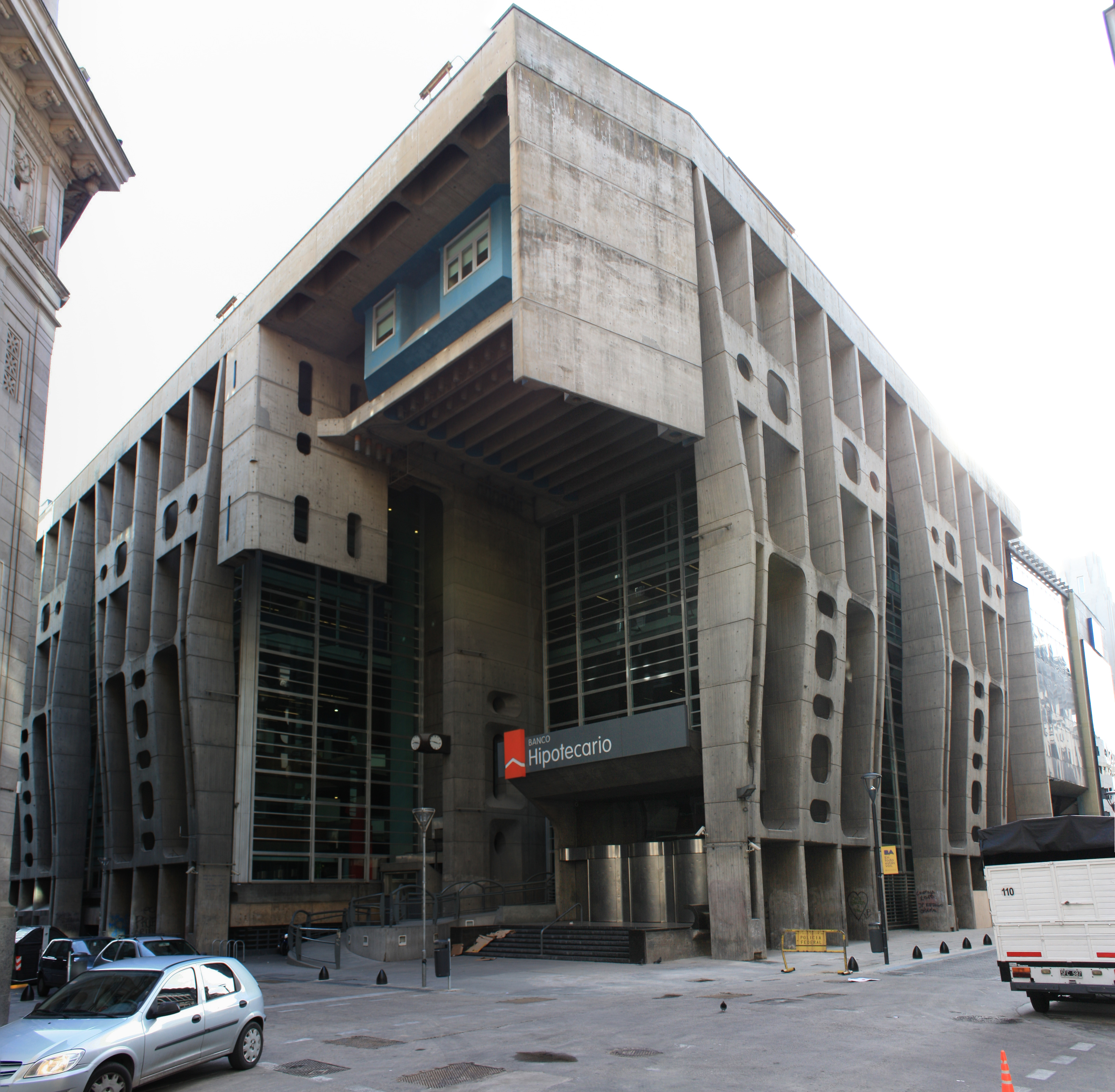
The Banco de Londres y América del Sur Headquarters by Clorindo Testa, in Buenos Aires, Argentina

In Argentina, the main representative of brutalism was Clorindo Testa, who designed the Banco de Londres y América del Sur Headquarters, and the National Library of Argentina. Federico Peralta Ramos was responsible for the Entel (now Telefónica) building.

=== Serbia ===
In Serbia, Božidar Janković was a representative of the so-called "Belgrade School of residence", identifiable by its functionalist relations on the basis of the flat and elaborated in detail the architecture. Mihajlo Mitrović designed the Western City Gate, also known as the Genex Tower, a 36-storey skyscraper in Belgrade, Serbia, in 1977. It is formed by two towers connected with a two-storey bridge and revolving restaurant at the top. It is 117 m (384 ft) tall (with restaurant 135–140 m (443–459 ft)) and is the second-tallest high-rise in Belgrade after Ušće Tower. The building was designed in the brutalist style with some elements of structuralism and constructivism. It is considered a prime representative of the brutalist architecture in Serbia and one of the best of its style built in the 1960s and the 1970s in the world. The treatment of the form and details is slightly associating the building with postmodernism and is today one of the rare surviving representatives of this style's early period in Serbia. The artistic expression of the gate marked an entire era in Serbian architecture.

=== Vietnam ===
In Vietnam, brutalist architecture is particularly popular among old public buildings and has been associated with the bao cấp era (lit.: subsidising), the period during which the country followed Soviet-type economic planning. Many Soviet architects, most notably Garol Isakovich, were sent to Vietnam during that time to help train new architects and played an influential role in shaping the country's architectural styles for decades. Isakovich himself also designed some of the most notable brutalist buildings in Vietnam, including the Vietnam-Soviet Friendship Palace of Culture and Labour (1985). In his later years, Isakovich, who was awarded the Hero of Labor by the Vietnamese government in 1976, is said to have deviated from the brutalist style and adopted Vietnamese traditional styles in his design, which has been referred to by some Vietnamese architects as Chủ nghĩa hiện đại địa phương (lit.: local modernism) and hậu hiện đại (postmodernism). In the former South Vietnam, Ngô Viết Thụ, the first Asian architect to become an Honorary Fellow of the American Institute of Architects, designed the Independence Palace (1966), which has been said to include brutalist elements.

=== Bosnia and Herzegovina ===
Bosnian Architect Slobodan Jovandić is known for brutalist buildings in Bosnia and Herzegovina and other Balkan countries. Two of his most famous buildings, the Hotel Internacional and the residential building Lamela, Zenica, can be found in the town of Zenica.

== On university campuses ==
=== United Kingdom ===
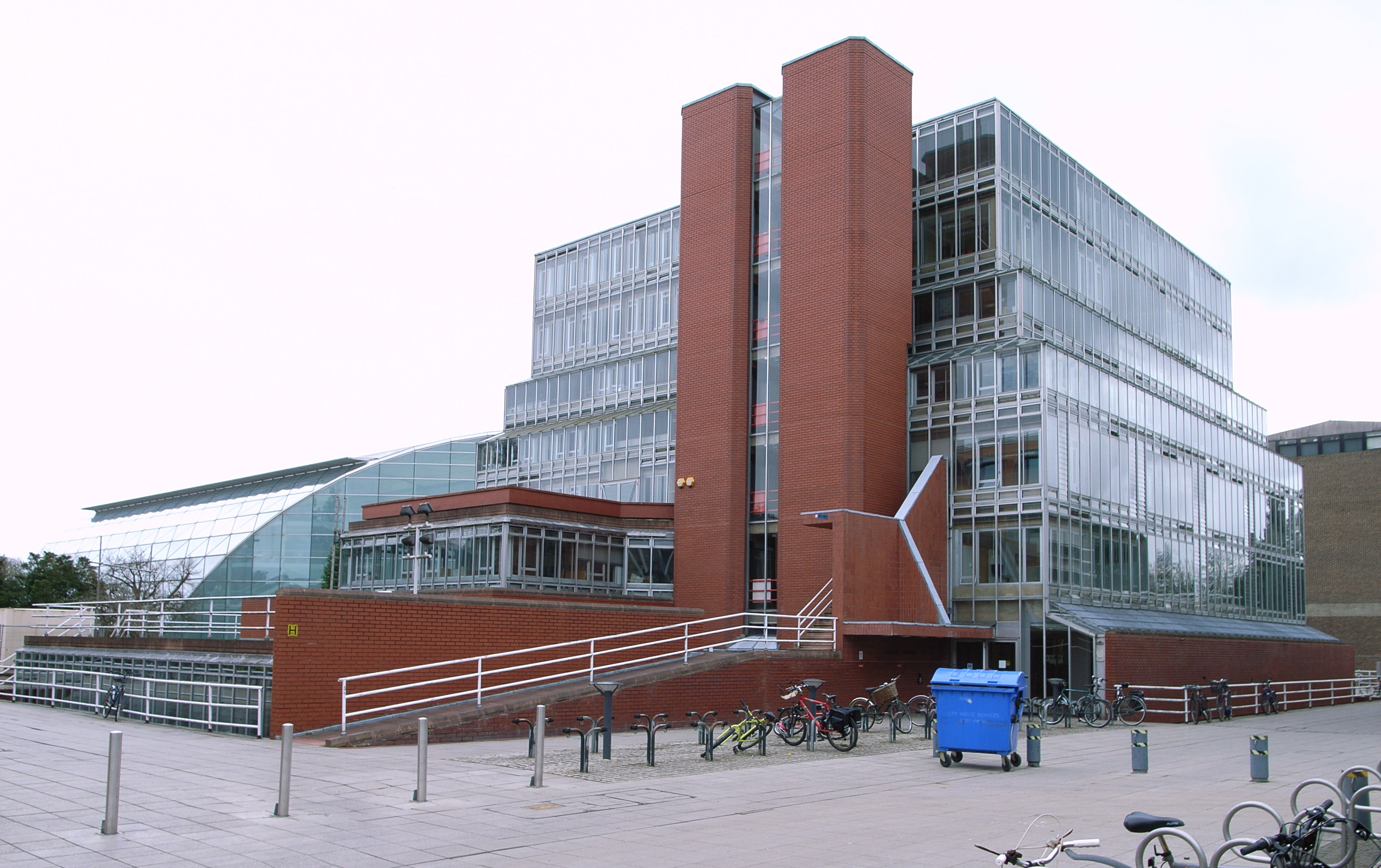
James Stirling's History Faculty Building (1968), University of Cambridge

Early examples of brutalist architecture in British universities include the 'beehives' at St John's College, Oxford, (Michael Powers of the Architects' Co-Partnership; 1958–1960) and the extension to the department of architecture at the University of Cambridge in 1959 under the influence of Leslie Martin, the head of the department, and designed by Colin St John Wilson and Alex Hardy, with participation by students at the university. This inspired further brutalist buildings in Cambridge, including the Grade II listed University Centre and the Grade II listed Churchill College. The Grade II* listed History Faculty Building (1964–1967) is described in its listing as "a distinctive example of a new approach to education buildings, from a period when the universities were at the forefront of architectural patronage". It was the second building in architect James Stirling's Red Trilogy, which started with the University of Leicester Engineering Building (with James Gowan; 1959–1963), designed to reflect the vernacular architecture of Leicester's factories and sometimes regarded as the first post modern building in Britain, and concluded with the Florey Building at Queen's College, Oxford (1966–1971).

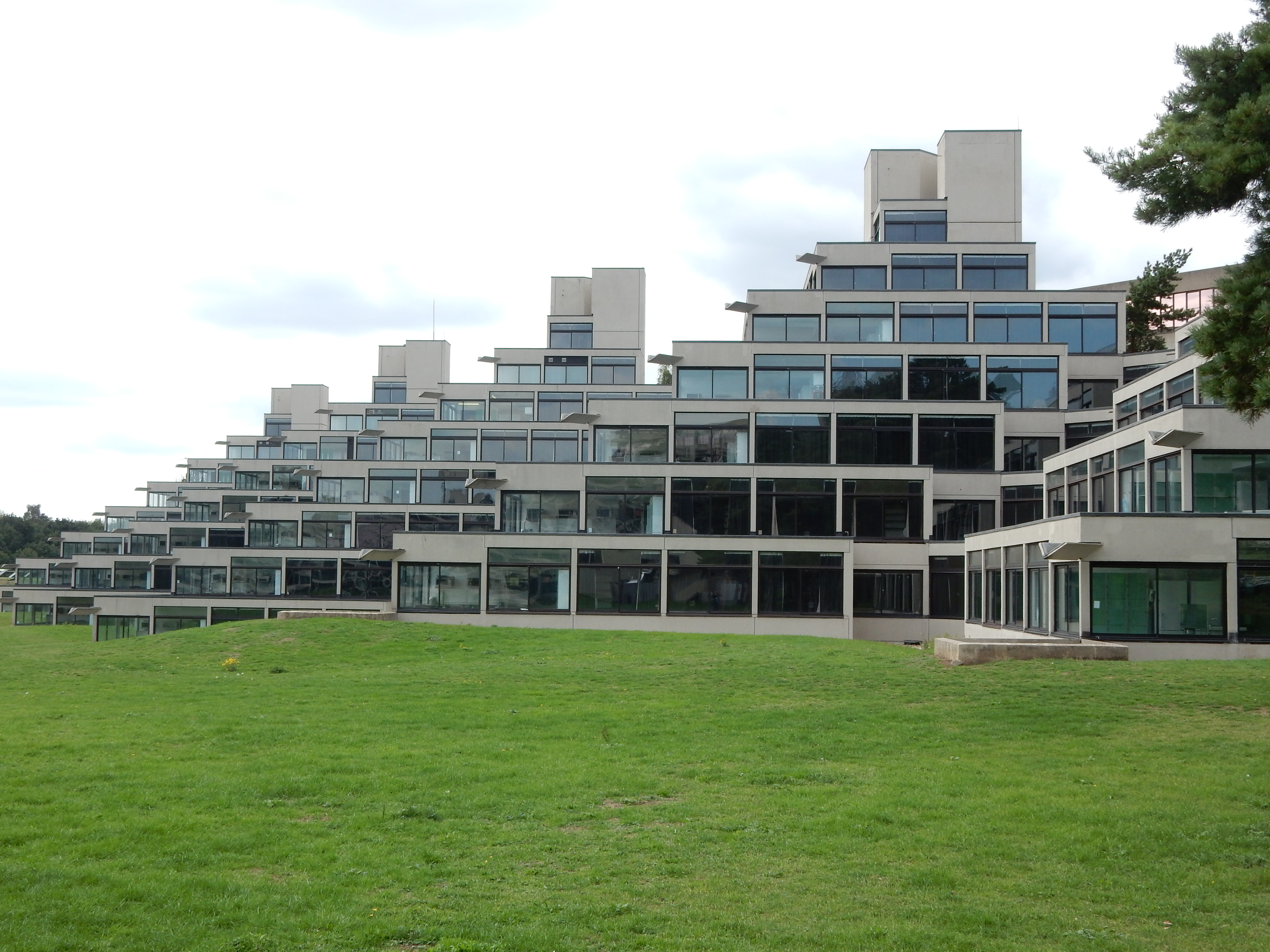
Denys Lasdun's 'ziggurats' (1968), University of East Anglia

The building of new universities in the UK in the 1960s led to opportunities for brutalist architects. The first to be built was the University of Sussex, designed by Basil Spence, with the Grade I listed Falmer House (1960–1962) as its centrepiece. The building has been described as a "meeting of Arts and Crafts with modernism", with features such as hand-made bricks that contrast with the pre-fabricated construction of other 1960s campuses, and colonnades of bare, board-marked concrete arches on brick piers inspired by the Colosseum. It is also considered one of the "key brutalist buildings" by the Royal Institute of British Architects. It has, in a reversal of the usual situation for brutalist architecture, received popular acclaim while being less liked by professional critics and is sometimes described as picturesque rather than brutalist.

Denys Lasdun's work at the University of East Anglia, including six linked halls of residence in Norfolk Terrace and four linked halls of residence in Suffolk Terrace (commonly referred to as the 'ziggurats') and the library and 'teaching wall' between them, is considered one of the finest examples of a 1960s brutalist university campus. The ziggurats were closed in 2023 as part of the reinforced autoclaved aerated concrete crisis, with no date set for their refurbishment as of February 2025. Another notable example is the Central Hall of the University of York (1966–1968) with its surrounding colleges (1963–1965) designed by Stirrat Johnson-Marshall and Andrew Derbyshire of Robert Matthew, Johnson-Marshall & Partners. The reinforced concrete of the Central Hall gives a contrast to the colleges, which were the first university buildings built using the CLASP prefabricated system originally developed for school buildings. The same architectural practice would go on to build the universities of Bath, Stirling and Ulster. The Grade II listed lecture block at Brunel University (John Heywood of Richard Sheppard, Robson and Partners; 1965–1968) was used as a location in Stanley Kubrick's 1971 film A Clockwork Orange. The central campus complex of the University of Essex (1964) was designed by Kenneth Capon of the Architects' Co-Partnership, with complementary concrete extensions by Patel Taylor matching the brutalist aesthetic in 2015.

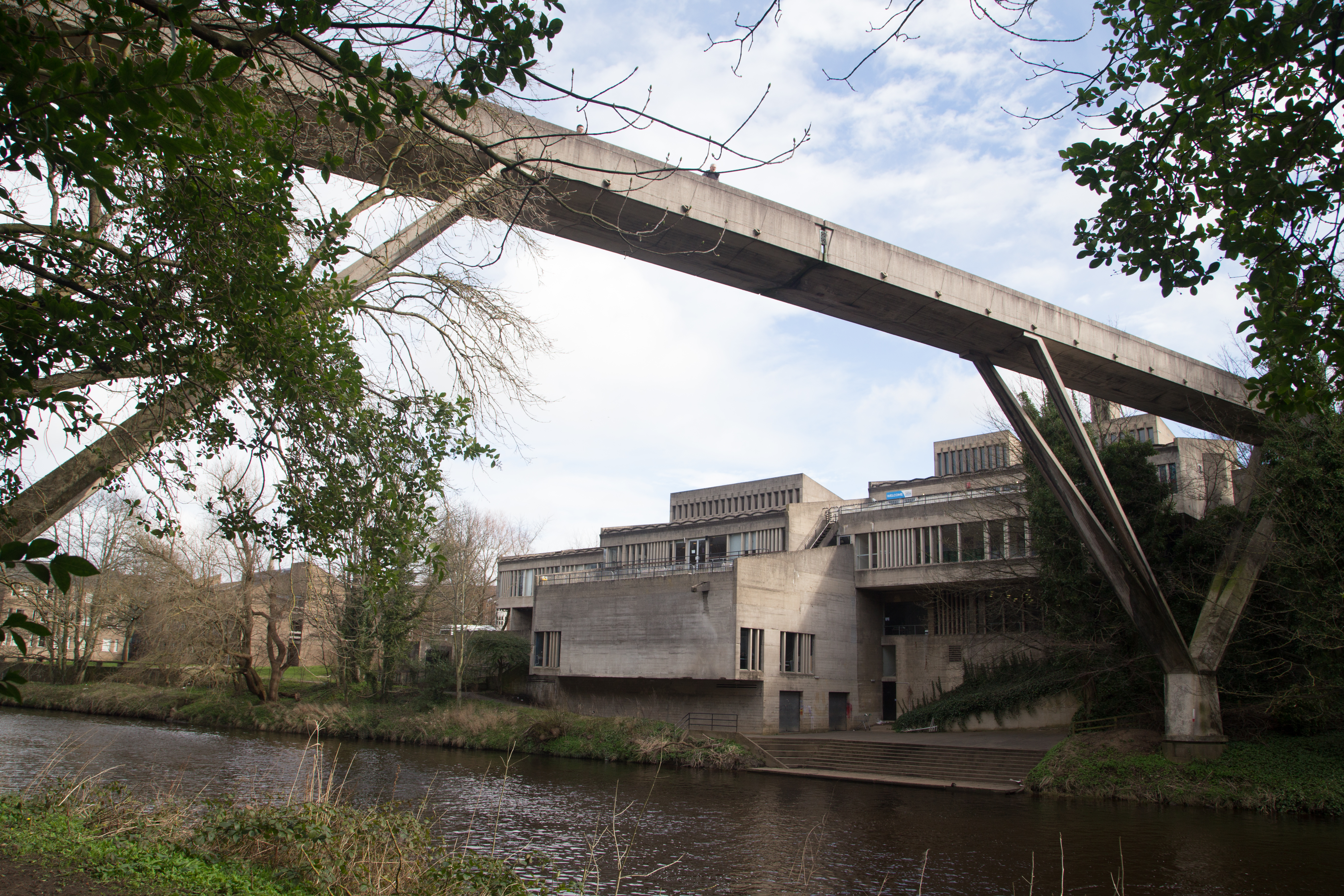
Kingsgate Bridge (1963) and Dunelm House (1966), Durham University

A notable pairing of brutalist campus buildings is found at Durham University, with Ove Arup's Grade I-listed Kingsgate Bridge (1963), one of only six post-1961 buildings to have been listed as Grade I by 2017, and the Grade II-listed Dunelm House (Richard Raines of the Architects' Co-Partnership with Michael Powers as the partner-in-charge; 1964–1966), described in its listing as "the foremost students' union building of the post-war era in England" but only saved from demolition in 2021 following a five-year campaign by the Twentieth Century Society. Dunelm House was designed to reflect the vernacular architecture of the city in the way its multiple levels cascade down the river bank, breaking up the bulk of the building. This led Pevsner to describe it as "Brutal by tradition but not brutal to the landscape" and to it being praised as a brutalist building that works well in its setting even by opponents of the style.

=== United States ===
Reyner Banahm, in his influencial 1955 essay The New Brutalism, tried to identify built brutalist buildings other than the Hunstanton School. The only building which he found to make a strong case at the time was Louis Kahn's Yale Art Center at Yale University in New Haven. Though buildings conventionally considered brutalist would not arrive until a decade later, with one of the earliest brutalist buildings in the US being Paul Rudolph's 1963 Art and Architecture Building. Where, as department chair, he was both client and architect, giving him a unique freedom to explore new directions. Rudolph's 1964 design for the University of Massachusetts Dartmouth is a rare example of an entire campus designed in the brutalist style, and was considered by him to be "the most complete realisation of his experiments with urbanism and monumentality". Walter Netsch similarly designed the entire University of Illinois-Chicago Circle Campus (now the East Campus of the University of Illinois at Chicago) under a single, unified brutalist design. Netsch also designed the brutalist Joseph Regenstein Library for the University of Chicago and the Northwestern University Library. Crafton Hills College in California was designed by desert modern architect E. Stewart Williams in 1965 and built between 1966 and 1976. Williams' brutalist design contrasts with the steep terrain of the area and was chosen in part because it provided a firebreak from the surrounding environment. The Boston Architectural College's main building at 320 Newbury Street was designed by Ashley, Myer and Associates in 1966. In 1979, muralist Richard Haas painted a 50-foot architectural trompe l'oeil mural on the building's west side.

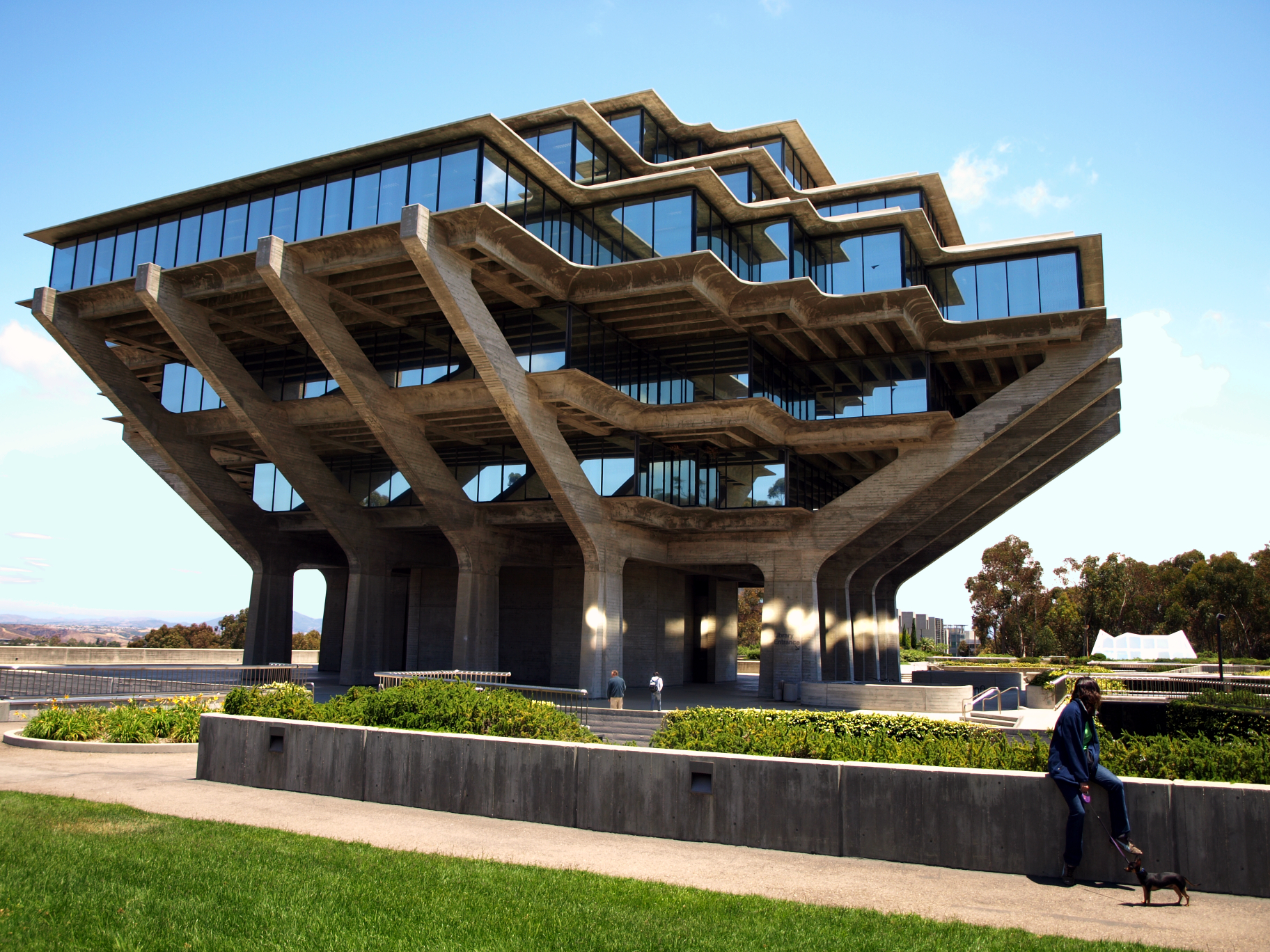
William Pereira's Geisel Library (1970), University of California, San Diego

One of the most famous brutalist buildings in the United States is Geisel Library at the University of California, San Diego. Designed by William Pereira and built 1969–70, it is said to "occup[y] a fascinating nexus between brutalism and futurism" but was originally intended as a modernist building in steel and glass before cost considerations meant the structural elements were redesigned in concrete and moved to the outside of the building. Evans Woollen III's brutalist Clowes Memorial Hall, a performing arts facility that opened in 1963 on the campus of Butler University in Indianapolis, was praised for its bold and dramatic design. The University of Minnesota's West Bank campus features the Rarig Center, a performing arts venue by Ralph Rapson from 1971 that has been called "the best example in the Twin Cities of the style called Brutalism". Faner Hall at Southern Illinois University Carbondale has long been controversial for its use of brutalism and has been considered an eyesore on campus, deemed to have a "facade only a mother could love" by the university itself.

The Joseph Mark Lauinger Library, the main library of the Georgetown University Library System, was designed by John Carl Warnecke and opened in 1970. Originally conceived with a traditional design similar to other buildings at Georgetown University, the final design of the Lauinger Library embraces brutalism and was intended as a modern interpretation of the nearby Healy Hall, a Flemish Romanesque building. The building once received the Award of Merit by the American Institute of Architects in 1976 for distinguished accomplishment in library architecture. However, in recent years, as public attitudes towards brutalism have shifted, the library has been referred to as one of the "ugliest" buildings in Georgetown and Washington, D.C.

=== Elsewhere ===
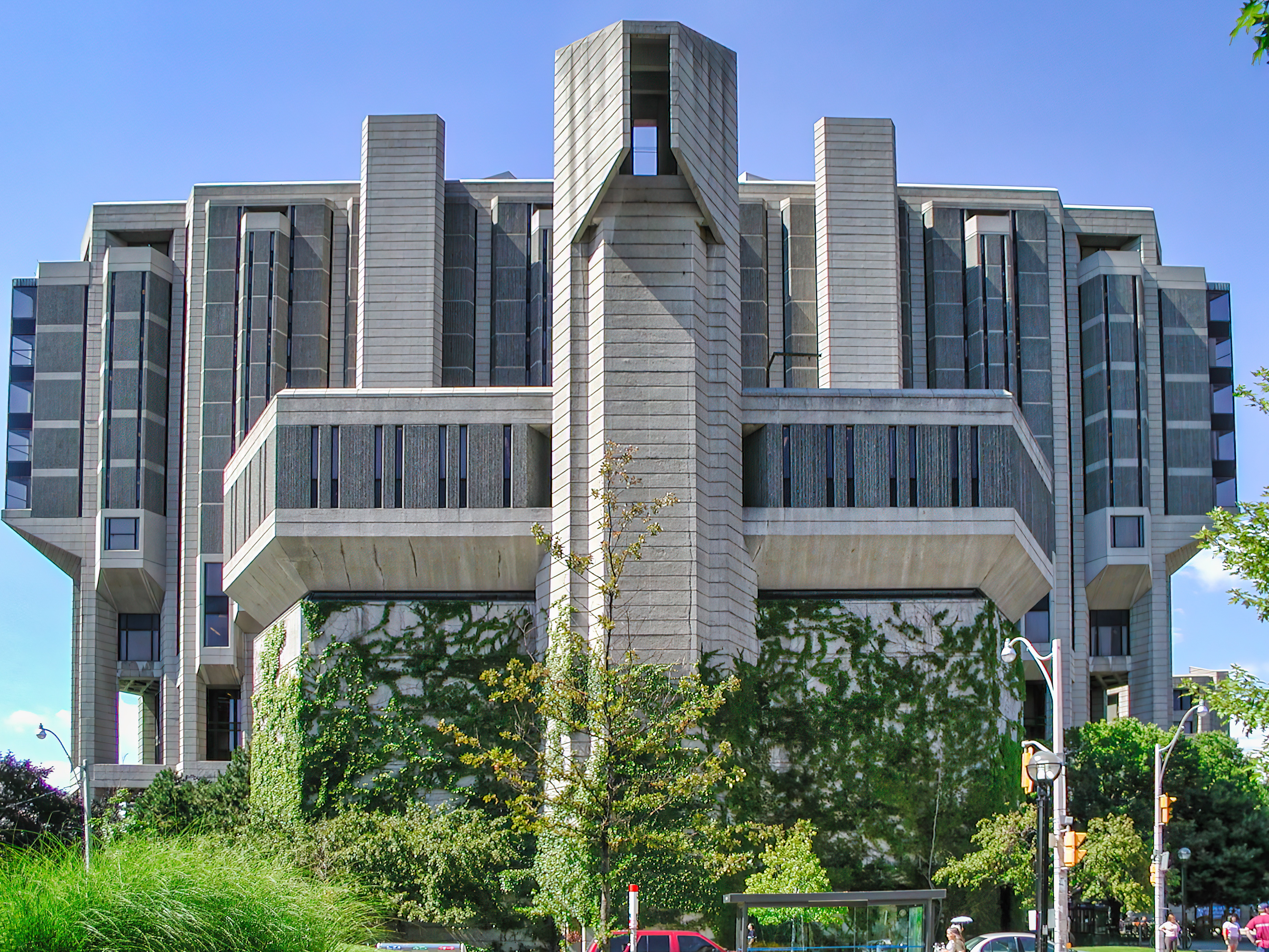
The Robarts Library (1974), University of Toronto

Examples of brutalist university campuses can be found in other countries as well. The Robarts Library at the University of Toronto was designed by Warner, Burns, Toan & Lunde and built between 1968 and 1973. Although it has been called "a crowning achievement of the brutalist movement", its opening in 1974 came after public sentiment had turned against brutalism, leading to it being condemned as "a blunder on the grandest scale". In Turkey, the Middle East Technical University campus in Ankara is a notable example of brutalist architecture, designed by Behruz and Altuğ Çinici in the 1960s. Rand Afrikaans University in Johannesburg, South Africa (now Kingsway Campus Auckland Park, University of Johannesburg) is largely brutalist, designed as an expression of Afrikaans identity. Several universities in Southeast Asia also feature brutalist designs, including those at the Ho Chi Minh City Medicine and Pharmaceutical University, the Royal University of Phnom Penh, and the Industrial College of Hue.

== Reception ==
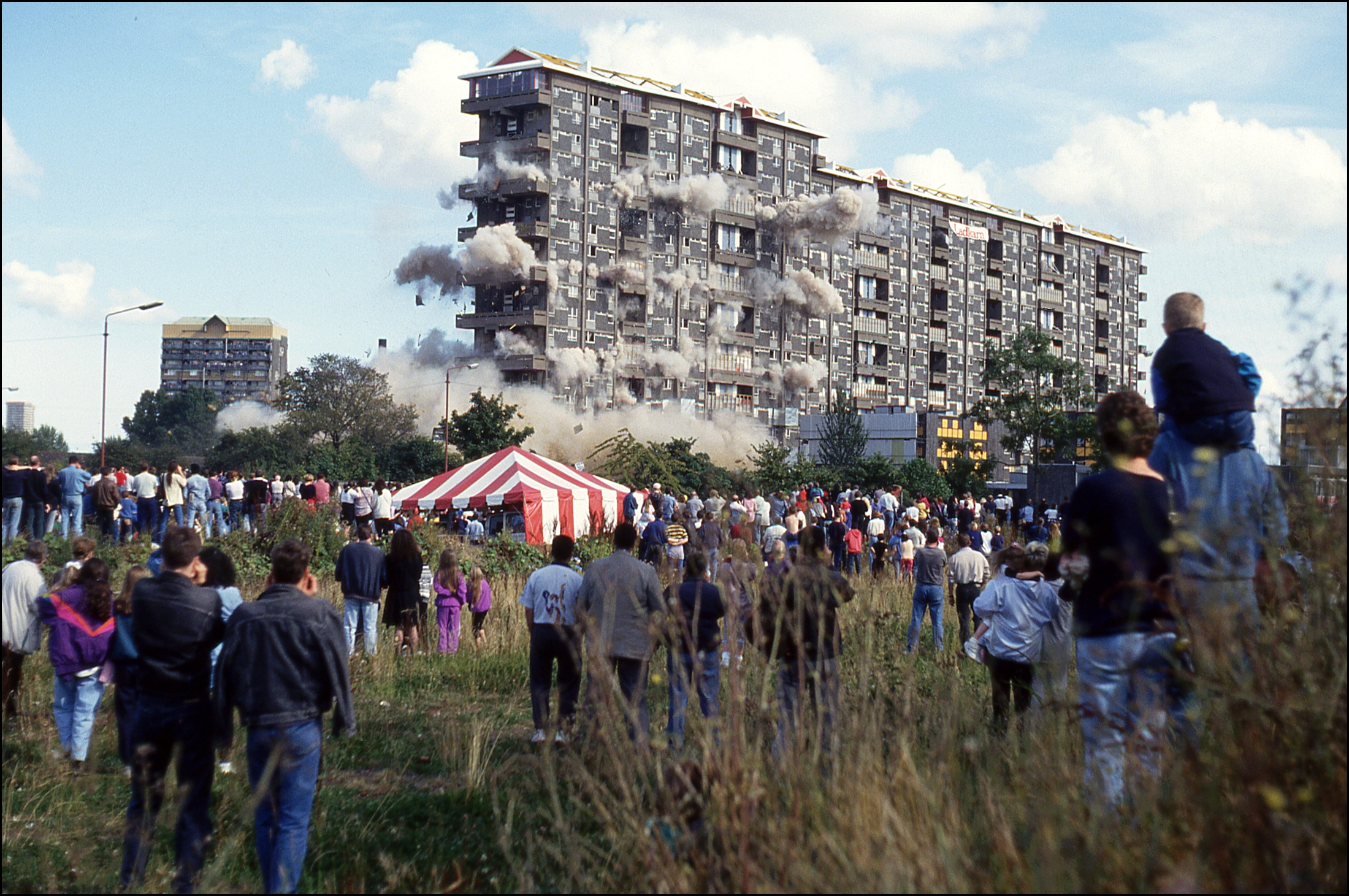
The Queen Elizabeth Square flats (1962) in Glasgow being demolished in 1993.

A 2014 article in The Economist noted its unpopularity with the public, observing that a campaign to demolish a building will usually be directed against a brutalist one. According to Simon Jenkins, "Few styles in history can have been met with so many pleas from its users to see it destroyed." In 2005, the British TV programme Demolition ran a public vote to select twelve buildings that ought to be demolished, and eight of those selected were brutalist buildings.

One argument is that this criticism exists in part because concrete façades do not age well in damp, cloudy maritime climates such as those of northwestern Europe and New England. In these climates, the concrete becomes streaked with water stains and sometimes with moss and lichen, and rust stains from the steel reinforcing bars.

Critics of the style find it unappealing due to its "cold" appearance, projecting an atmosphere of totalitarianism, as well as the association of the buildings with urban decay due to materials weathering poorly in certain climates and the surfaces being prone to vandalism by graffiti. Despite this, the style is appreciated by others, and preservation efforts are taking place in the United Kingdom.

== In the 21st century ==
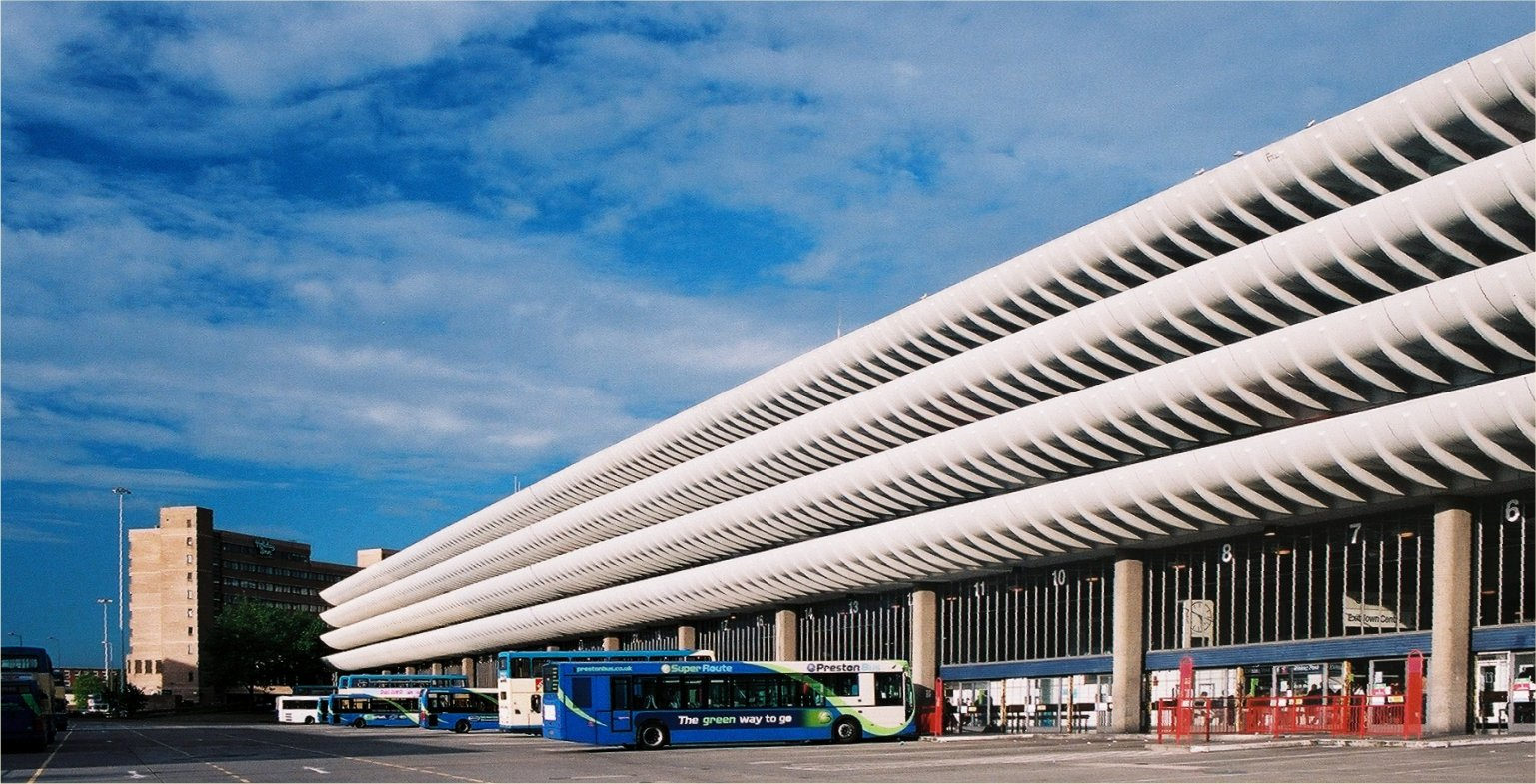
After two unsuccessful proposals to demolish Preston bus station (1969, Lancashire, UK), it gained Grade II listed building status in September 2013.

Although the original brutalist movement was largely over by the late 1970s and early 1980s, having largely given way to structural expressionism and deconstructivism, it has experienced a resurgence of interest since 2015 with the publication of a variety of guides and books, including Brutal London (Zupagrafika, 2015), Brutalist London Map (2015), This Brutal World (2016), SOS Brutalism: A Global Survey (2017) and the Atlas of Brutalist Architecture (2018). This resurgence of interest has been accompanied by new construction in the brutalist style, termed neobrutalism.

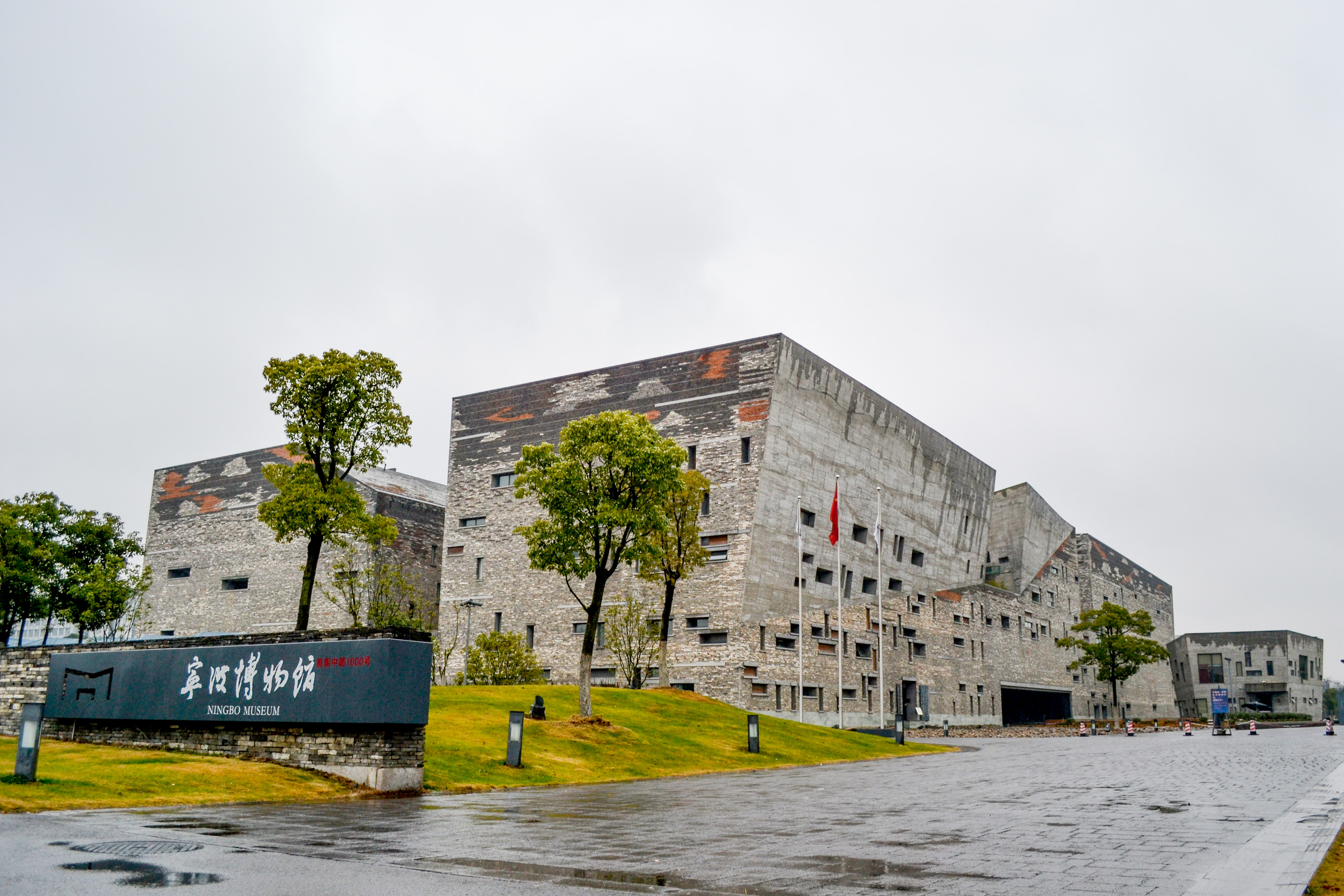
Wang Shu's neobrutalist Ningbo Museum (2008)

Neobrutalist buildings have included Wang Shu's Ningbo Museum, where traces of the bamboo framework are visible on the monumental concrete, referred to in his 2012 Pritzker Prize citation as "an urban icon". In general, however, neobrutalist buildings tend to be commissioned by the private sector, such as the campus of the private University of Engineering and Technology (UTEC) in Peru, designed by Yvonne Farrell and Shelley McNamara and referenced in the citation for their 2020 Pritzker Prize. They may also use more ecologically friendly materials, such as recycled bricks or timber construction, rather than concrete, while maintaining the fundamental concept of exposing the materials and structural elements, an approach taken at the Colegio Reggio in Madrid.

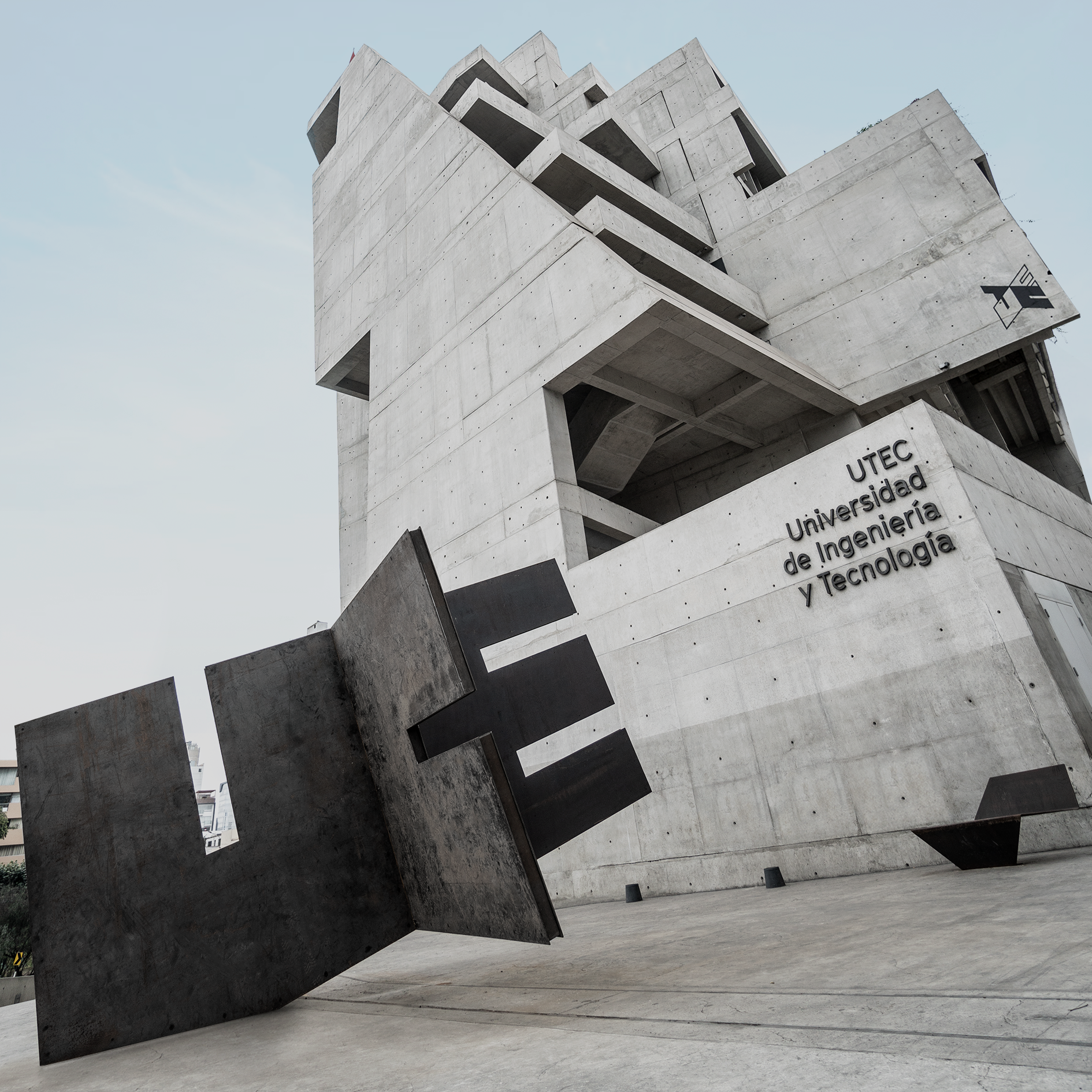
The neobrutalist University of Engineering and Technology (2015)

Many of the defining aspects of the style have been softened in newer buildings, with concrete façades often being sandblasted to create a stone-like surface, covered in stucco, or composed of patterned, precast elements. These elements are also found in renovations of older brutalist buildings, such as the redevelopment of Sheffield's Park Hill. However, board-marked concrete in the brutalist tradition is still used in some developments, such as the neobrutalist Silberrad Student Centre and library extension at the University of Essex, designed to be sympathetic to the existing 1960s brutalist campus buildings and taking "the opportunity to use in-situ brutalist concrete as a sensitive contextual material".

Villa Göth was listed as historically significant by the Uppsala county administrative board on 3 March 1995. Several brutalist buildings in the United Kingdom have been granted listed status as historic, and others, such as Gillespie, Kidd & Coia's St. Peter's Seminary, named by Prospect magazine's survey of architects as Scotland's greatest post-war building, have been the subject of conservation campaigns. Similar buildings in the United States have been recognized, such as the Pirelli Tire Building in New Haven's Long Wharf. The Twentieth Century Society has unsuccessfully campaigned against the demolition of British buildings such as the Tricorn Centre and Trinity Square multi-storey car park, made famous by its prominent role in the film Get Carter, but successfully in the case of Preston bus station garage (2013) and London's Southbank Centre (2026), among others. The Grade II listing of the centre, which includes the Queen Elizabeth Hall and the Hayward Gallery, followed a 35-year campaign by the Society whose director, Catherine Croft, said "The battle has been won and brutalism has finally come of age", although Simon Heffer responded to the listing by calling for the centre's demolition.

Notable buildings that have been demolished include Owen Luder and Rodney Gordon's Tricorn Centre (2004), the Smithsons' Robin Hood Gardens (2017) in East London, John Madin's Birmingham Central Library (2016), Marcel Breuer's American Press Institute Building in Reston, Virginia, Araldo Cossutta's Third Church of Christ, Scientist in Washington, D.C. (2014), and the Welbeck Street car park in London (2019).

== See also ==
- Utopian architecture
- Soviet architectural modernism
- Khrushchevka
- Bauhaus
- List of Brutalist structures
