= Ciganović =

Ciganović is a surname. The Croatian census of 2011 listed it as the most common surname in Kaptol, Požega-Slavonia County.

Notable people with the surname include:

- Milan Ciganović, a Serbian revolutionary
- Luka Ciganović, a Croatian water polo player
