= Alan Anton =

Alan Anton may refer to:

- Alan Anton (musician), bassist of the Cowboy Junkies
- Alan Anton (footballer) (1933–1994), Australian rules footballer
