= Villa Göth =

House in Uppsala, Sweden

Coordinates: 59.843981°N 17.629794°E

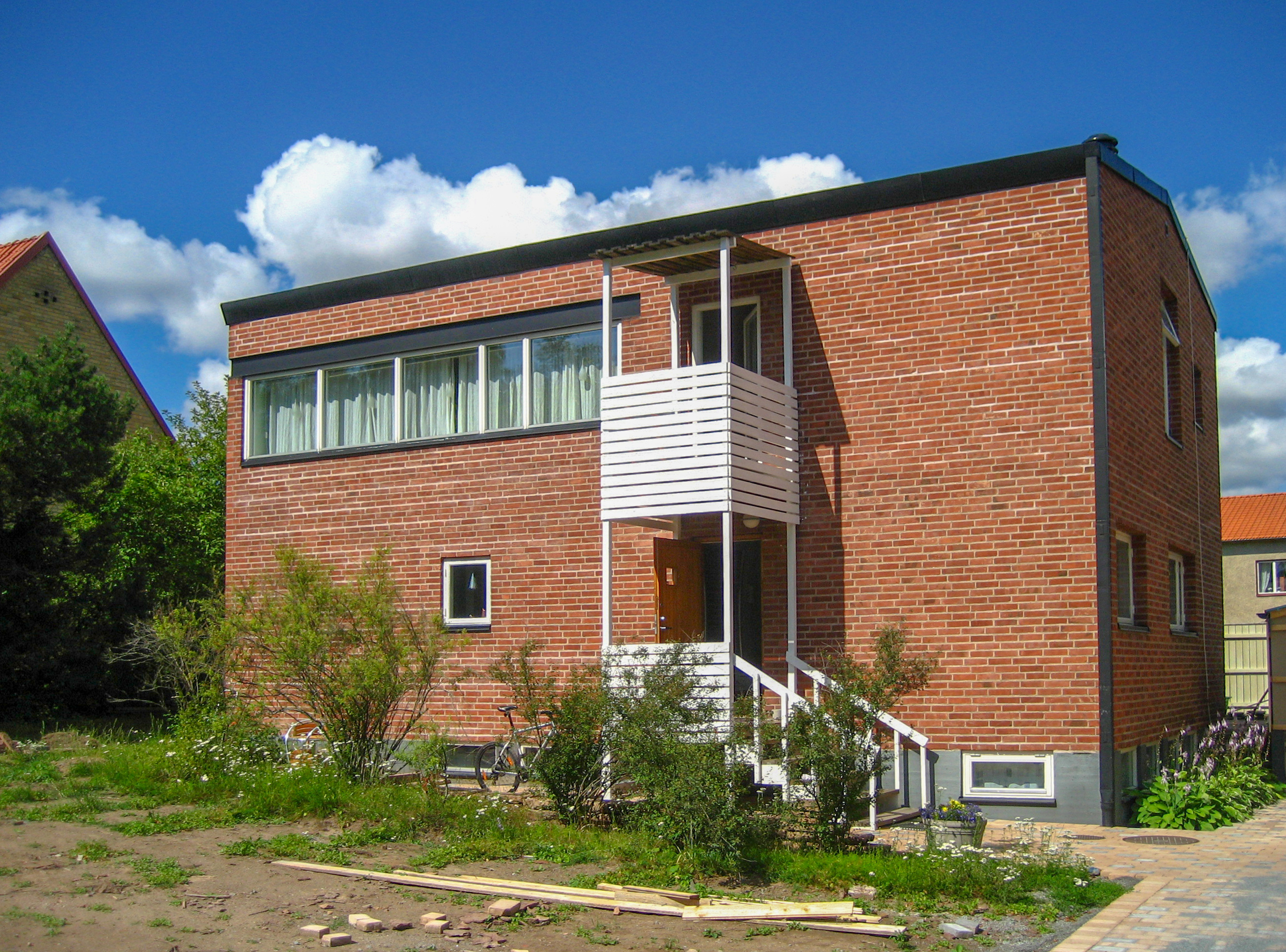
Villa Göth in 2008

Villa Göth is a house on the street of Döbelnsgatan in the Kåbo neighborhood of Uppsala, Sweden. Completed in 1950, the home is listed as having a special architectural interest in Sweden (byggnadsminne). Architects Bengt Edman and Lennart Holm designed it as the residence of Pharmacia head Elis Göth. The building has significance in international architectural history as the believed source of the term brutalism.

Villa Göth has two floors and a basement and is built in dark brick. The windows are plain but form partial rows in the façade. The visible I-beams over the window sections in the front and rear of the building are an example of how the choice of materials is openly displayed in the house. The roof is a flat, gable roof. The floor plan is open on the interior, and materials are consistently made visible in a straightforward way. The tongue-and-groove pattern of the boards used to build the forms for the poured concrete is visible in the ceilings. Several interior walls are of the same dark brick as the exterior. The bathrooms on the first floor are formed of raw concrete (béton brut) in the form of Alvar Aalto's famous Aalto Vase. Centrally located in the house is the open stairway that connects the floors.

== Villa Göth and brutalism ==
The term brutalism was popularized by British architectural critic Reyner Banham, who used it in 1966 in his book The New Brutalism: Ethic or Aesthetic? to characterize a new group of architectural trends, specifically in Europe. It is believed to have been coined in 1950 by Swedish architect Hans Asplund in a facetious comment about Villa Göth. The expression was spread by British colleagues visiting Sweden and adopted by younger architects in the UK. In a letter from Hans Asplund to the editor of The Architectural Review, published in August 1956, Asplund describes how he first used the term. The letter is reproduced in Reyner Banham's New Brutalism.

New brutalism centers on simplicity and Functionalist principles, intended to avoid the creation of associations or emotions. Stylistically, brutalism is viewed as a reaction to the architecture of the 1940s, much of which was characterized by a retrospective nostalgia.

Brutalism is an expression often used derogatorily to denote largeness of scale, insensitivity, and the use of raw materials. Villa Göth is often viewed as having a severe, aloof impression, but it is also a simple and carefully prepared building with well-received architectonic qualities. This well-preserved and culturally significant house was listed as historically significant by the Uppsala county administrative board on March 3, 1995.
