= Joe Ware (baseball) =

American baseball player (1913–1994)

- Outfielder / Second baseman / First baseman
- Born: June 5, 1913; Greenwood, South Carolina, U.S.
- Died: January 10, 1994 (aged 80); Pittsburgh, Pennsylvania, U.S.
- Batted: Right Threw: Right

Negro league baseball debut
- 1932, for the Cleveland Stars

Last appearance
- 1935, for the Newark Dodgers

Teams
- Cleveland Stars (1932); Pittsburgh Crawfords (1932); Akron Grays (1933); Newark Dodgers (1935)

Joseph Lewman Ware (June 5, 1913 – January 10, 1994), nicknamed "Showboat", was an American professional baseball outfielder, second baseman and first baseman in the Negro leagues in the 1930s.

A native of Greenwood, South Carolina, Ware attended Westinghouse High School in Pittsburgh, Pennsylvania, and played college football at Howard University. He made his Negro league debut in 1932 for the Cleveland Stars, and played for the Pittsburgh Crawfords later in that season. Ware also had one-season stints for the Akron Grays (in 1933) and Newark Dodgers (in 1935). Ware died in Pittsburgh, Pennsylvania in 1994 at age 80.
