= Styrbjörn Holm =

Swedish sailor

Styrbjörn Holm (14 February 1928 – 20 January 1994) was a Swedish sailor who competed in the 1964 Summer Olympics.
