= Jim Patterson (Australian footballer) =

Australian rules footballer, born 1919

Personal information
- Full name: James Francis Patterson
- Born: 8 May 1919; Collie, Western Australia
- Died: 13 January 1994 (aged 74)
- Height: 182 cm (6 ft 0 in)
- Weight: 78 kg (172 lb)

Playing career^{1}
Years	Club	Games (Goals)
1943–44, 1946–47	North Melbourne	25 (20)
1947–48	Sandringham (VFA)	37 (18)
1949	Perth (WAFL)	1 (0)
- ^{1} Playing statistics correct to the end of 1947.

Career highlights
- 1947 VFA Grand Final

James Francis Patterson (8 May 1919 – 13 January 1994) was an Australian rules footballer who played with North Melbourne in the Victorian Football League (VFL).

Patterson enlisted in the Royal Australian Navy in 1936, aged 17, and served for a total of 12 years, including all of World War II. It was during his service with the Army that he played a total of 25 games with North Melbourne across four seasons.

Patterson subsequently played for Sandringham for two years before returning to Western Australia where he played a solitary game for Perth in the West Australian Football League.
