= Rigmor Olsen =

Danish swimmer

Personal information
- Born: 12 February 1907 Frederiksberg, Denmark
- Died: 9 January 1994 (aged 86) Roskilde, Denmark

Sport
- Sport: Swimming

Rigmor Olsen (12 January 1907 – 9 January 1994) was a Danish swimmer. She competed in the women's 4 × 100 metre freestyle relay event at the 1928 Summer Olympics.
