= Les Bollman =

Australian rules footballer

Personal information
- Full name: Leslie Bollman
- Born: 15 July 1904
- Died: 11 January 1994 (aged 89)
- Original team: Yarraville

Playing career^{1}
| Years | Club | Games (Goals) |
| 1928–1929 | South Melbourne | 17 (0) |
- ^{1} Playing statistics correct to the end of 1929.

Leslie Bollman (15 July 1904 – 11 January 1994) was an Australian rules footballer who played with South Melbourne in the Victorian Football League (VFL).
