= Erhard Bauer =

German footballer

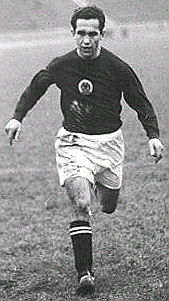
- Erhard Bauer in 1956

Personal information
- Date of birth: 30 May 1925
- Place of birth: Germany
- Date of death: 13 January 1994 (aged 68)
- Place of death: Germany
- Position: Defender

Senior career*
| Years | Team | Apps | (Gls) |
| 1950–1953 | Motor Zwickau | 74 | (0) |
| 1953–1959 | Wismut Aue | 129 | (4) |
| Total | | 203 | (4) |

International career
| 1954 | East Germany | 3 | (0) |
- * Club domestic league appearances and goals

Erhard Bauer (30 May 1925 – 13 January 1994) was a German footballer.
