= Milwaukee County War Memorial =

Memorial building in Wisconsin, US

- United States of America
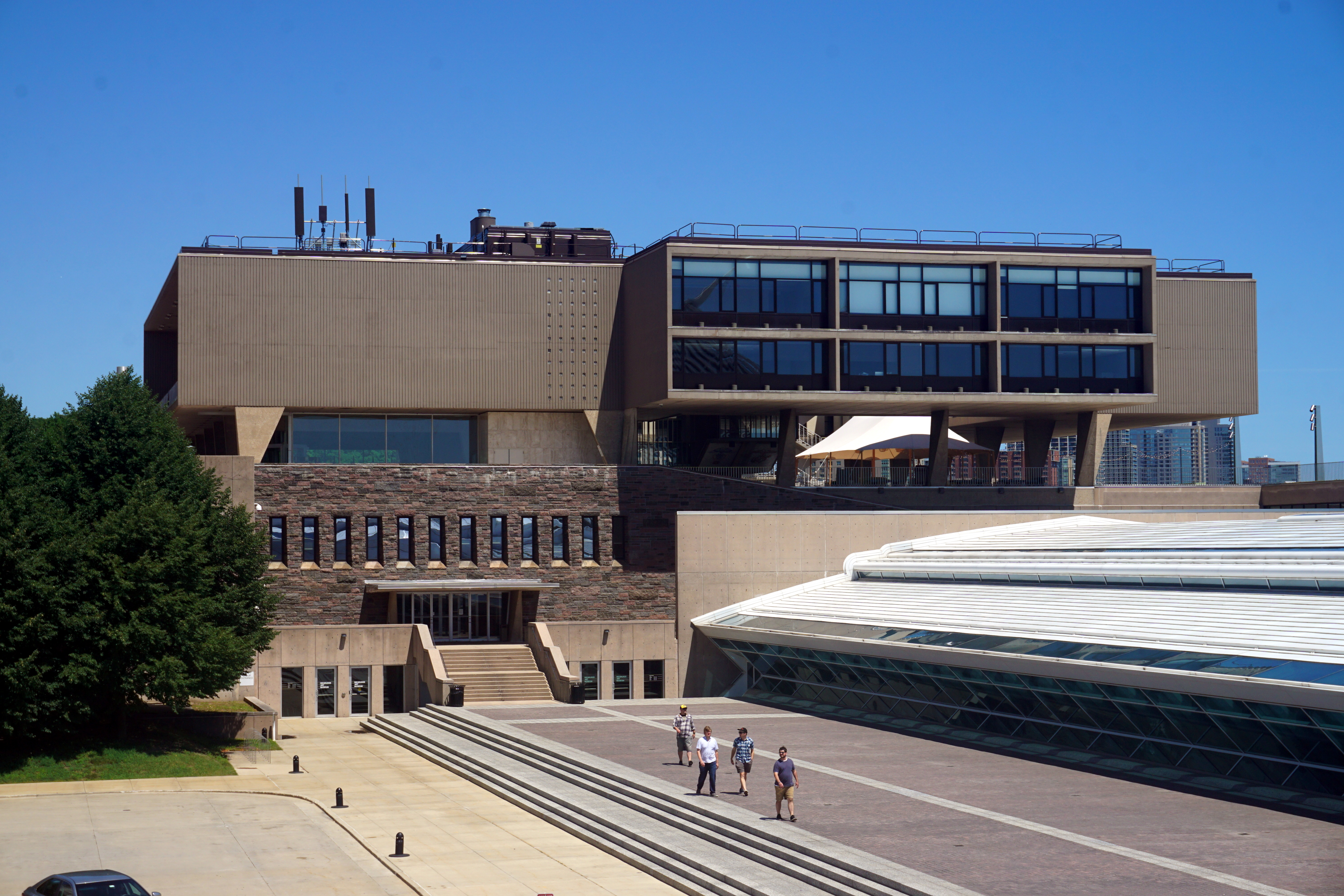
- The Milwaukee County War Memorial
- For all those who have served in the U.S. Armed Services
- Established: November 11, 1957
- Location: 43.04052°N 87.89715°W; Milwaukee, Wisconsin, United States of America
- Designed by: Eero Saarinen

Burials by nation
- United States of America

The Milwaukee County War Memorial is a memorial building located on Lake Michigan in Milwaukee, Wisconsin. It was designed by architect Eero Saarinen. Construction began in 1955 and the building was dedicated on Veterans Day in 1957.

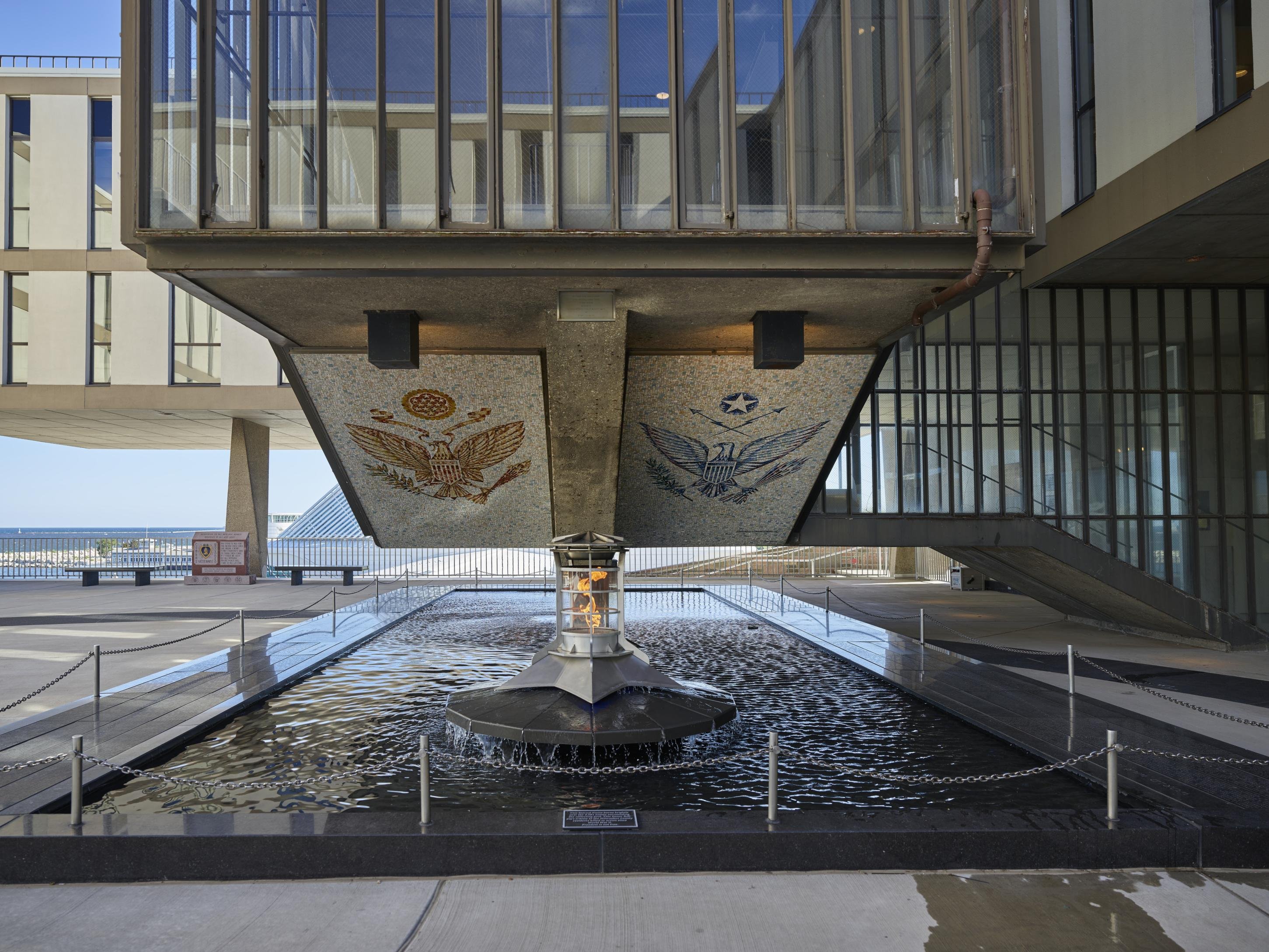
Patio of the Milwaukee County War Memorial Center

The mosaic mural by Edmund Lewandowski was installed in 1959. The mosaic uses more than one million pieces of glass and marble. The slightly abstracted Roman numerals, in shades of purple, blue, and rich black, are the beginning and ending dates of the U.S. involvement in the Second World War and the Korean War. MCMXLI (1941) through MCMXLV (1945) refers to World War II, and MCML (1950) through MCMLIII (1953) refers to the Korean War.
