= Miroslav Vejvoda =

Czech sailor

Personal information
- Nationality: Czech
- Born: 5 July 1932; Prague, Czechoslovakia
- Died: 10 January 1994 (aged 61)

Sport
- Sport: Sailing

Miroslav Vejvoda (5 July 1932 – 10 January 1994) was a Czech sailor. He competed at the 1964 Summer Olympics and the 1972 Summer Olympics.
