= Mary Meijer-van der Sluis =

Dutch fencer (1917–1994)

Personal information
- Born: 11 July 1917 Rotterdam, Netherlands
- Died: 31 January 1994 (aged 76) Miami, Florida, U.S.

Sport
- Sport: Fencing

Mary Meijer-van der Sluis (11 July 1917 – 31 January 1994) was a Dutch fencer and singer. She competed in the women's individual foil event at the 1948 Summer Olympics.

== Biography ==
Born Mary van der Sluis to a Jewish family in Rotterdam, she married Mozes Meijer in 1940 there three months after the German bombing of that city. Though before the war she had fenced competitively, becoming Dutch champion foil fencing in 1937, she primarily focused on performing and teaching singing until at least the 1950s. Nevertheless, in 1948, when competitions were restarted, she again became Dutch champion in foil and was selected for the Olympic Games. It was considered remarkable that a Jewish woman could compete at the Olympics so soon after the war. Mary participated in the 1957 Maccabiah Games, the 1969 Maccabiah Games, and the 1973 Maccabiah Games. In 1957 she won a gold medal, and in 1973 she was, at the age of 56 the oldest participant. In 1969, the youngest of her three children, Sophia Meijer, also became Dutch champion fencing.
