= Lamela, Zenica =

Residential skyscraper in Bosnia and Herzegovina

Lamela
- Lamela
- Lamela in 2019

- Location within Bosnia and Herzegovina

General information
- Type: Tower block
- Location: Zenica, Bosnia and Herzegovina
- Coordinates: 44°12′14.9″N 17°54′26.6″E
- Construction started: 1971
- Completed: 1976

Height
- Roof: 102 m (335 ft)

Technical details
- Floor count: 27

Design and construction
- Architect: Slobodan Jovandić

Other information
- Parking: Yes

Lamela is a residential building in Zenica, Bosnia and Herzegovina. Standing at a height of 102 m (335 ft), with 27 floors, it is the tallest building in the city. Designed by the architect Slobodan Jovandić, it was completed in 1976 and became the country's first modern skyscraper. Upon its completion, it held the title of the tallest building in Bosnia and Herzegovina for a decade, until it was surpassed by the UNITIC Towers in Sarajevo in 1986.
