= Hans Asplund =

Swedish architect

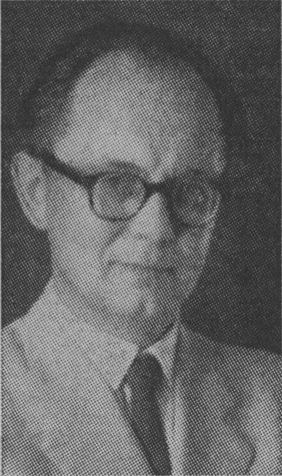
- Born: 16 August 1921; Utö, Sweden
- Died: 8 January 1994 (aged 72); Lund, Sweden
- Occupation: Architect

Hans Asplund (16 August 1921 – 8 January 1994) was a Swedish architect. His work was part of the architecture event in the art competition at the 1948 Summer Olympics. Hans Asplund was married in his second marriage to Anne Asplund (born 1937). He is buried at Skogskyrkogården in Stockholm.

== Biography ==
Hans Asplund trained as an architect at the Royal Institute of Technology in Stockholm from 1944 to 1947 and, in the same year, won first prize in a competition for a community centre in Eslöv. He was employed at the United Nations architectural office in New York 1947–1948, at the architectural office of Kooperativa Förbundet 1948–1950 and Nordiska Kompaniet 1951–1953. He was a professor of architecture at Lund University of Technology from 1964 to 1987.

Hans Asplund was the son of the architect Gunnar Asplund and Gerda Sellman (born 1892). His father had distinguished himself early on as a classicist, and later as one of the pioneers of Swedish functionalism. Hans Asplund spent much of his life as a modernist, both a practising architect and a teacher. He designed the Medborgarhuset in Eslöv and an extension to the Nordiska Kompaniet department store in Stockholm 1963.

Hans Asplund is said to have coined the term neo-brutalism in a joking comment in 1950 on the Villa Göth in Uppsala, designed by Bengt Edman and Lennart Holm. The term spread through English colleagues visiting Sweden and was taken up there by some younger architects.

Over time, Hans Asplund became increasingly critical of modernism and, in 1980, published the book Farväl till functionalism, which systematically reviewed what the author considered to be the shortcomings of modernist architecture.

Hans Asplund's second marriage was to Anne Asplund (born 1937). He is buried at Skogskyrkogården in Stockholm.
