= Alan Anton (footballer) =

Australian rules footballer

Personal information
- Full name: Alan Anton
- Born: 1 January 1933
- Died: 31 January 1994 (aged 61)
- Original team: Traralgon
- Height: 180 cm (5 ft 11 in)
- Weight: 80 kg (176 lb)

Playing career^{1}
Years	Club	Games (Goals)
1955	Fitzroy	2 (2)
- ^{1} Playing statistics correct to the end of 1955.

Alan Anton (1 January 1933 – 31 January 1994) was an Australian rules footballer who played for the Fitzroy Football Club in the Victorian Football League (VFL).
