= Luka Ciganović =

Croatian water polo player

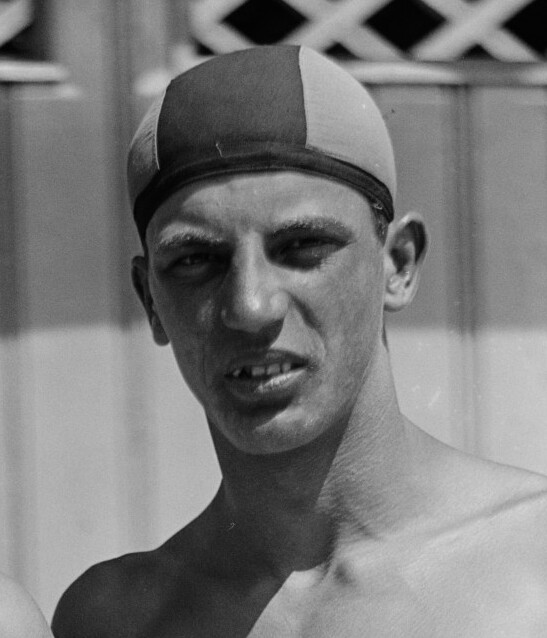
- Ciganović in 1932

Personal information
- Nationality: Serbian
- Born: 12 January 1915; Dubrovnik, Austria-Hungary
- Died: 9 January 1994 (aged 78); Dubrovnik, Croatia

Sport
- Sport: Water polo

Luka Ciganović (12 January 1915 – 9 January 1994) was a water polo player. He competed at the 1936 Summer Olympics and the 1948 Summer Olympics.
