= Deaths in February 1993 =

The following is a list of notable deaths in February 1993.

Entries for each day are listed alphabetically by surname. A typical entry lists information in the following sequence:

- Name, age, country of citizenship at birth, subsequent country of citizenship (if applicable), reason for notability, cause of death (if known), and reference.

== February 1993 ==
=== 1 ===
- Michael Blundell, 85, Kenyan farmer and politician.
- José Bravo, 76, Spanish football player.
- Mehrab Shahrokhi, 48, Iranian football player.
- Gregg G. Tallas, 84, Greek film director and film editor.
- Sven Thofelt, 88, Swedish Olympic pentathlete and fencer (1928, 1932, 1936, 1948).
- Harold Edward Winch, 85, Canadian politician.

=== 2 ===
- Merle Anthony, 66, American baseball umpire.
- Gino Bechi, 79, Italian operatic baritone.
- Bernard Braden, 76, Canadian-British actor and comedian, stroke.
- Emilio Bulgarelli, 75, Italian Olympic water polo player (1948).
- Clemente Fracassi, 75, Italian film producer, director and screenwriter.
- Michael Klein, 33, Romanian football player, heart attack.
- Lenny Levy, 79, American baseball player, coach and scout.
- Reid Miles, 65, American graphic designer and photographer.
- Emmett Morrison, 77, American basketball player.
- Harry Nilsson, 77, Swedish football defender.
- John Peck, 55, Australian rules footballer.
- Bernard Peters, 82-83, Polish-German nuclear physicist.
- François Reichenbach, 71, French film director, producer and screenwriter.
- Alexander Schneider, 84, Lithuanian-American violinist, heart failure.

=== 3 ===
- Viktor Ajbek, 72, Croatian footballer.
- Françoys Bernier, 65, Canadian musician.
- Rosetta Calavetta, 78, Italian actress and voice dubber.
- Omar Cañas, 23, Colombian Olympic footballer (1992), shot.
- Gianni Colombo, 56, Italian artist.
- Paul Emery, 76, English racing driver.
- Edith Elizabeth Farkas, 71, Hungarian-New Zealand antarctic researcher and meteorologist, bone cancer.
- Karel Goeyvaerts, 69, Belgian composer.
- Perry Hall, 94, American baseball player.
- Éliane de Meuse, 93, Belgian painter.
- Alby Newell, 71, Australian rules footballer.
- Tauno Rinkinen, 68, Finnish Olympic boxer (1948).
- Tan Shaowen, 63, Chinese politician, lung cancer.
- Gunnar Werner, 77, Swedish Olympic swimmer (1936).
- Bill Williams, 88, Australian rules footballer.

=== 4 ===
- Eldon Jenne, 93, American Olympic track and field athlete (1920).
- Daulat Singh Kothari, 86, Indian scientist and educationist.
- Joaquín Oliva, 66, Spanish football player.
- Connie Saylor, 52, American NASCAR racecar driver, cancer.

=== 5 ===
- T. W. Alley, 50, American football player and coach, heart attack.
- Sidney Bernstein, Baron Bernstein, 94, British businessman and media executive.
- William Pène du Bois, 76, American writer and book illustrator, stroke.
- Ed Boland, 84, American baseball player (Philadelphia Phillies, Washington Senators).
- Seán Flanagan, 71, Irish Fianna Fáil politician.
- Baharul Islam, 74, Indian politician, MP (1962–1972, 1983–1989).
- Hans Jonas, 89, German-American philosopher.
- Adnan Kahveci, 43, Turkish politician, traffic collision.
- Roxanne Kernohan, 32, Canadian actress, traffic collision.
- Marcel Léger, 62, Canadian politician, MNA (1970–1985).
- Joseph L. Mankiewicz, 83, American film director and screenwriter (All About Eve, A Letter to Three Wives), heart attack.
- Frank McNally, 85, American football player (Chicago Cardinals).
- Tip Tipping, 34, English stuntman (Batman, Willow) and actor (Aliens), parachuting accident.
- Jack Young, 80, English cricketer.
- Huang Zhizhen, 72, Chinese politician.

=== 6 ===
- Arthur Allsopp, 84, Australian cricketer.
- Arthur Ashe, 49, American tennis player, AIDS.
- George Bellew, 93, British officer of arms.
- Ruggero Biancani, 78, Italian Olympic athlete (1936).
- Mohammad Natsir, 84, Indonesian islamic scholar and prime minister.
- Ion Negoițescu, 71, Romanian writer and historian.
- Jaroslav Sadílek, 79, Czech Olympic figure skater (1936).

=== 7 ===
- Shovkat Alakbarova, 70, Azerbaijani singer.
- Frank Balistrieri, 74, American mobster belonging to the Milwaukee crime family.
- Duilio Brignetti, 66, Italian Olympic pentathlete (1948, 1952).
- William Hayman, 89, English Anglican prelate, Archdeacon of Lewisham (1960–1972).
- Noboru Ito, 90, Japanese composer.
- Erling Dekke Næss, 91, Norwegian shipowner and businessman.
- Buddy Pepper, 70, American pianist and songwriter.
- Mohsen Sarhan, 79, Egyptian actor.
- Floyd Stromme, 76, American baseball player (Cleveland Indians).

=== 8 ===
- Frank Davies, 85, Australian rules footballer.
- George Garlick, 71, Australian rules footballer.
- Teddy Glover, 90, English-American football player.
- Oto Grigalka, 67, Soviet Latvian track and field athlete and Olympian (1952, 1956).
- William Ewing Hester, 80, American tennis player and official.
- Douglas Heyes, 73, American screenwriter, heart attack.
- Eliot Janeway, 80, American economist.
- Anthony Kramreither, 66, Australian-Canadian film producer.
- Charles R. Lord, 61, American intelligence official, Deputy Director of the National Security Agency (1986–1988).
- Roland Mousnier, 85, French historian.
- Franz Schnyder, 82, Swiss film director.
- Nagalingam Shanmugathasan, 72, Sri Lankan trade unionist.
- Bram van der Stok, 77, Dutch fighter pilot and flying ace during World War II.

=== 9 ===
- Marián Filc, 44, Slovak Olympic figure skater (1968), heart attack.
- Bill Grundy, 69, English journalist and broadcaster, heart attack.
- Saburo Okita, 78, Japanese politician and economist.
- Elwood Richard Quesada, 88, American lieutenant general and businessman.
- Virginie Rausch, 86, Luxembourgian Olympic swimmer (1928).
- Mingun Sayadaw, 81, Burmese theravada Buddhist monk.
- Kate Wilkinson, 76, American actress, bone cancer.

=== 10 ===
- Elmer Barbour, 74, American gridiron football player (New York Giants).
- James C. H. Bonbright, 90, American diplomat and ambassador.
- Maurice Bourgès-Maunoury, 78, French politician, prime minister (1957).
- William E. Cleator, Sr., 65, American politician, cancer.
- Bengt Edlén, 86, Swedish astronomer and academic.
- Fred Hollows, 63, New Zealand-Australian ophthalmologist, renal cancer.
- Gaya Prasad Katiyar, 92, Indian revolutionary.
- Mickey Murtagh, 88, American football player (New York Giants).
- Rip Repulski, 64, American baseball player (St. Louis Cardinals, Philadelphia Phillies, Los Angeles Dodgers).

=== 11 ===
- Kamal Amrohi, 75, Indian film director and screenwriter.
- Charles Eric Dawson, 70, Canadian ichthyologist.
- Joy Garrett, 47, American actress (Days of Our Lives), liver failure.
- Robert W. Holley, 71, American biochemist, Nobel Prize recipient (1968), lung cancer.
- Brian Inglis, 76, Irish journalist, historian and television presenter.
- Oksana Kostina, 20, Russian rhythmic gymnast, traffic collision.
- Desanka Maksimović, 94, Serbian poet and writer.
- Leo Nolan, 83, Australian rules footballer.
- Félix Ruiz, 52, Spanish footballer.
- Newton Steers, 76, American politician, member of the United States House of Representatives (1977-1979).
- Alex Stewart, 84, Australian rules footballer.

=== 12 ===
- Joe Booher, 51, American racing driver, racing accident.
- James Bulger, 2, English murder victim.
- Mark W. Ellingson, 88, American academic, president of the Rochester Institute of Technology (1936–1969).
- Thelma G. Thurstone, 95, American psychologist and psychological testing pioneer.
- Federico Valle, 85, Puerto Rican Olympic sports shooter (1956).

=== 13 ===
- Araxie Babayan, 86, Soviet and Armenian organic chemist.
- G. H. Diggle, 90, English chess player.
- William Dodd, 84, English cricketer.
- Henry Duey, 84, American weightlifter and Olympic medalist (1932).
- Willoughby Gray, 76, English actor (Howards' Way, The Princess Bride, A View to a Kill), cancer.

=== 14 ===
- Elek Bacsik, 66, Hungarian-American jazz guitarist and violinist.
- Adrian Berce, 34, Australian Olympic field hockey player (1984).
- Eleazar Lipsky, 81, American lawyer, writer and playwright, leukemia.
- Eric Lionel Mascall, 87, English Anglican priest and theologian.
- Pedro Cortina y Mauri, 84, Spanish politician and diplomat.
- Veljko Milanković, 38, Bosnian Serb military commander, killed in battle.
- Terry Reardon, 73, Canadian ice hockey player (Boston Bruins, Montreal Canadiens) and coach.
- Lester Wilson, 50, American dancer and choreographer (Saturday Night Fever), heart attack.

=== 15 ===
- Kay Eakin, 75, American gridiron football player (New York Giants).
- Cary Gilbert, 50, American lyricist ("Me and Mrs. Jones"), diabetes.
- Marie-Louise Linssen-Vaessen, 64, Dutch freestyle swimmer and Olympic medalist (1948, 1952).
- George Wallington, 68, American jazz pianist.

=== 16 ===
- Leland D. Crawford, 63, United States Marine officer.
- Amos Guttman, 38, Israeli film director (Amazing Grace, Drifting), AIDS-related complications.
- Peter Molloy, 83, English football player, manager and referee.
- Robert Francis Peckham, 72, American district judge (United States District Court for the Northern District of California).
- Richard S. Salant, 78, American news executive.
- Bill Zinser, 73, American baseball player (Washington Senators).

=== 17 ===
- Hans Baur, 95, German flying ace.
- Eşref Bitlis, 59-60, Turkish general, plane crash.
- Jack Froggatt, 70, English football player.
- Rani Gaidinlu, 78, Indian revolutionary.
- Kostas Karagiannis, 60-61, Greek film director.
- Sammy Lowe, 74, American trumpeter.
- Paul Masino, 81, French Olympic gymnast (1936).
- Hans Scherbart, 87, German Olympic field hockey player (1936).
- Leslie Townsend, 89, English cricketer.

=== 18 ===
- Marshall Carter, 83, American Army Lieutenant general.
- Ted Haworth, 75, American production designer (Sayonara, Some Like It Hot, The Longest Day), Oscar winner (1958), cardiovascular disease.
- Jacqueline Hill, 63, English actress (Doctor Who), breast cancer.
- Rita La Roy, 91, American actress and dancer, pneumonia.
- Allen Montgomery Lewis, 83, Saint Lucian barrister and public servant.
- Leslie Norman, 81, English film director.
- Arthur Skinner, 73, British Olympic sports shooter (1960).
- Kerry Von Erich, 33, American professional wrestler (WCCW), suicide by gunshot.

=== 19 ===
- David L. Bazelon, 83, American circuit judge (United States Court of Appeals for the District of Columbia Circuit).
- Greg Brehaut, 46, Australian rules footballer.
- Judith Chaplin, 53, British politician, pulmonary embolism.
- Alexander Davydov, 80, Soviet and Ukrainian physicist.
- Bernard T. Feld, 73, American nuclear physicist and academic.
- Gerhard Gesell, 82, American judge.
- Mohamed Hamzah, 74, Malaysian vexillographer, architect and field marshal.
- Česlovas Kudaba, 58, Lithuanian politician and geographer.
- Yusif Mirzayev, 34, Azerbaijani soldier, killed in battle.
- Yaman Okay, 41, Turkish actor, pancreatic cancer.

=== 20 ===
- Mario Abreu, 73, Venezuelan artist.
- Howard Mayer Brown, 62, American musicologist.
- Marian Bublewicz, 42, Polish racing driver, racing collision.
- H. E. Kirchner, 55, American college basketball player (TCU Horned Frogs).
- Ferruccio Lamborghini, 76, Italian automobile manufacturer (Lamborghini), heart attack.

=== 21 ===
- Irma Christenson, 78, Swedish actress.
- Alison Fairlie, 75, English scholar.
- Harvey Kurtzman, 68, American cartoonist (Mad, Playboy), liver cancer.
- Inge Lehmann, 104, Danish seismologist and geophysicist.
- Eddy Tiel, 66, Dutch Olympic field hockey player (1948, 1952).
- Fredy Torres, 30, Salavadorian Olympic judoka (1984, 1988).
- Dick White, 86, British intelligence officer.

=== 22 ===
- Pierre Dalem, 80, Belgian football player.
- Jean Lecanuet, 72, French politician, cancer.
- Bill Lickiss, 68, Australian politician.
- Hugo Schrader, 90, German television and film actor.
- B. D. Sharma, 75, Indian politician.
- Sirio Vernati, 85, Swiss football player.
- Feng Zhi, 87, Chinese writer and translator.

=== 23 ===
- Helmut Braselmann, 81, German Olympic handball player (1936).
- Chuck Cook, 66, Canadian politician, member of the House of Commons of Canada (since 1979).
- Anne Dupire, 82, French Olympic swimmer (1928).
- Walter Fyrst, 91, Norwegian filmmaker.
- Joe Hutcheson, 88, American baseball player (Brooklyn Dodgers).
- Krisjānis Kundziņš, 87, Latvian Olympic wrestler (1936).
- Mario Pani, 81, Mexican architect and urbanist.
- Jarrett Robertson, 52, American army major general, helicopter crash.
- Carl Sautter, 44, American film and television writer (Moonlighting, Lucky Luke, Jetsons: The Movie).
- Phillip Terry, 83, American actor, stroke.
- Robert Triffin, 81, Belgian economist.

=== 24 ===
- Cyril Done, 72, English football player.
- Stuart Fleming, 72, Canadian politician, member of the House of Commons of Canada (1958-1965).
- Danny Gallivan, 75, Canadian sportscaster, heart failure.
- Bobby Moore, 51, English football player and world champion (1966), colorectal cancer.
- Chaim L. Pekeris, 84, Israeli-American physicist and mathematician.
- Roger Rochard, 79, French long-distance runner and Olympian (1932, 1936).
- Denis Vaucher, 95, Swiss cross country skier and Olympian (1924).

=== 25 ===
- Hashem Amoli, 93, Iranian scholar and ayatollah.
- Russ Brayshaw, 75, Canadian ice hockey player (Chicago Black Hawks).
- Toy Caldwell, 45, American guitarist (The Marshall Tucker Band), heart attack.
- Eddie Constantine, 79, American-French actor and singer, heart attack.
- Dave Cook, 51, British communist activist, complications following traffic accident.
- Sonja Mjøen, 94, Norwegian actress, journalist and author.
- Leopold Tajner, 71, Polish Olympic skier (1948, 1952).
- Mary Walter, 80, Filipino actress.
- Eren Özker, 44, Turkish-American puppeteer, cancer.

=== 26 ===
- John Besford, 82, English swimmer and Olympian (1928, 1936).
- Constance Ford, 69, American actress (Another World, A Summer Place), cancer.
- Fletcher Knebel, 81, American author, suicide by drug overdose.
- Beaumont Newhall, 84, American art historian.
- Giulio Oggioni, 76, Italian Catholic prelate.
- Arthur Maria Rabenalt, 87, Austrian film director, writer, and author.
- Carl Solomon, 64, American writer.

=== 27 ===
- Pina Carmirelli, 79, Italian violinist.
- Fred Daniels, 100, American baseball player.
- José Álvarez de Bohórquez, 97, Spanish equestrian and Olympic champion (1924, 1928).
- Lillian Gish, 99, American actress (The Birth of a Nation, Duel in the Sun, The Whales of August), heart failure.
- Ambrose A. Holowach, 78, Canadian businessman and politician.
- Steve Levantis, 76, Canadian football player.
- Walker Smith, 96, American track and field athlete and Olympian (1920).
- Marģeris Zariņš, 82, Latvian composer.
- Zhao Zengyi, 72-73, Chinese politician.

=== 28 ===
- Franco Brusati, 70, Italian film director (To Forget Venice).
- Joyce Carey, 94, English actress.
- Benoît Carrara, 66, French Olympic cross-country skier (1948, 1952, 1956, 1960).
- Holger Engberg, 84, Swedish Olympic ice hockey player (1936).
- Ishirō Honda, 81, Japanese film director (Godzilla), respiratory failure.
- Toshiaki Inoue, 42, Japanese triple jumper and Olympian (1972, 1976), accident.
- Ruby Keeler, 83, American actress and dancer, kidney cancer.
- Tamaarashi Kōhei, 51, Japanese sumo wrestler.
- Ilkka Koski, 64, Finnish Olympic heavyweight boxer (1952, 1956).
