= 200 metres breaststroke =

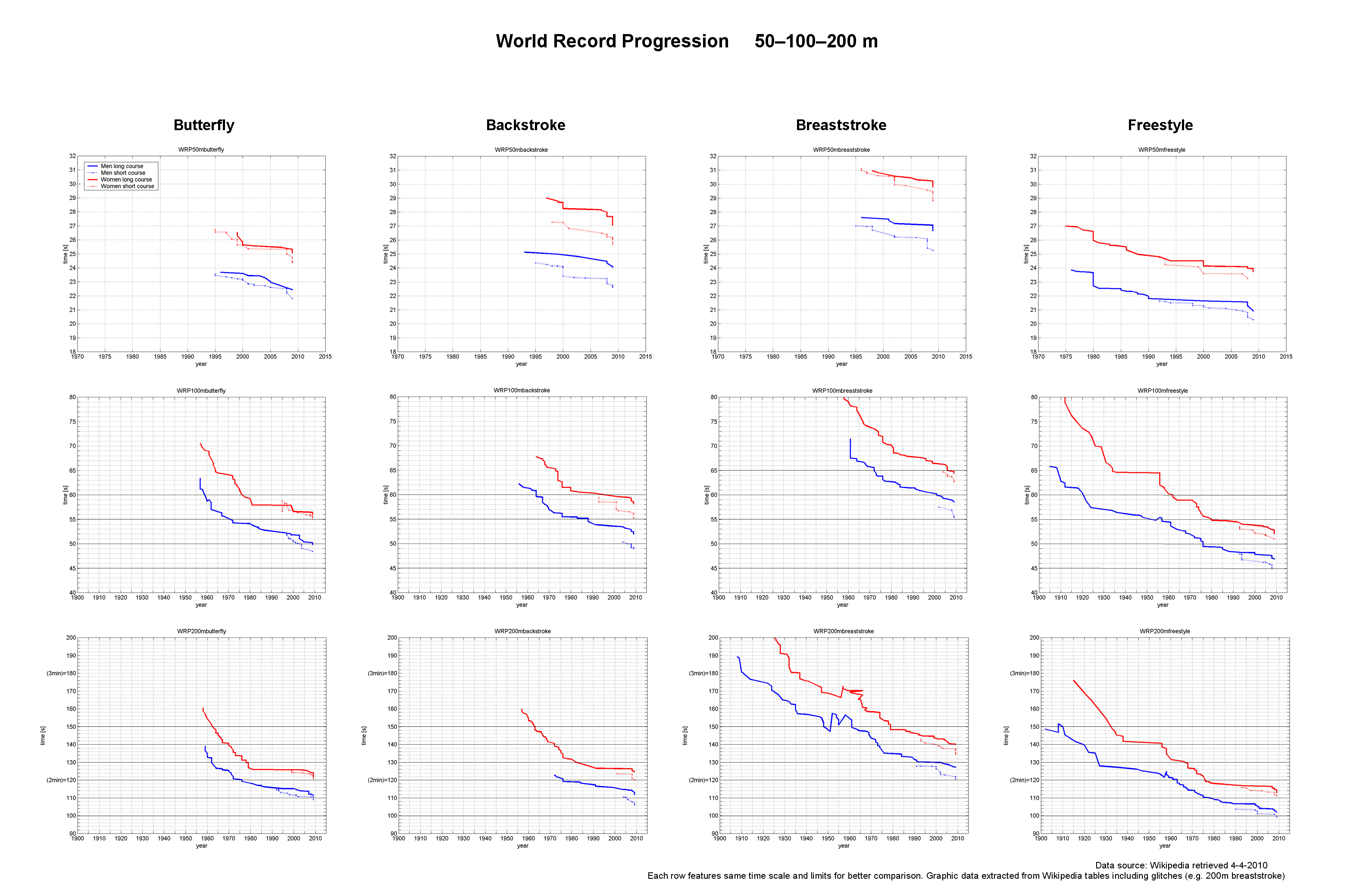
Graphic data for World Record Progression in Men and Women Swimming 50m-100m-200m Long and Short Course Butterfly-Backstroke-Breaststroke-Freestyle

The 200 metres breaststroke is an event in competitive swimming. World records are ratified by World Aquatics (formerly FINA). The current long course world record holders are Japan's Shin Ohashi and Russia's Evgeniia Chikunova, while the current short course world record holders are the Netherlands' Caspar Corbeau and the US' Kate Douglass.

The men's event was first contested at the Olympic Games in 1908, while the women's event was introduced at the 1924 games; the current Olympic champions are France's Léon Marchand, and Douglass. The men's and women's events have been contested at the World Aquatics Championships since the inaugural championships in 1973; the current world champions (long course) are China's Qin Haiyang, and Douglass. The men's and women's events have been contested at the World Aquatics Swimming Championships (25m) since the inaugural championships in 1993; the current world champions (short course) are Spain's Carles Coll, and Douglass.

== World record progression ==
=== Men long course ===
#	Time		Name	Nationality	Date	Meet	Location	Ref
1	3:09.2		Frederick Holman	Great Britain	18 July 1908	-	London, United Kingdom	
2	3:08.3		Robert Andersson	Great Britain	18 April 1909	-	Stockholm, Sweden	
3	3:00.8		Félicien Courbet	Belgium	2 October 1910	-	Schaerbeek, Belgium	
4	2:56.6		Percy Courtman	Great Britain	28 July 1914	-	Garston, United Kingdom	
5	2:54.4		Erich Rademacher	Germany	12 November 1922	-	Amsterdam, Netherlands	
6	2:52.6		Bob Skelton	United States	24 March 1924	-	Milwaukee, United States	
7	2:50.4		Erich Rademacher	Germany	7 April 1924	-	Magdeburg, Germany	
8	2:48.0		Erich Rademacher	Germany	11 March 1927	-	Brussels, Belgium	
9	2:45.0		Yoshiyuki Tsuruta	Japan	29 July 1927	-	Kyoto, Japan	
10	2:44.6		Lionel Spence	United States	2 April 1931	-	Chicago, United States	
11	2:44.0		Lionel Spence	United States	1 April 1932	-	New Haven, United States	
12	2:42.6		Jacques Cartonnet	United States	8 February 1933	-	Paris, France	
13	2:42.4		Erwin Sietas	Germany	16 March 1935	-	Düsseldorf, Germany	
14	2:39.6		Jacques Cartonnet	France	4 May 1935	-	Paris, France	
-	2:37.2	^{[a]}	Jack Kasley	United States	28 March 1936	-	New Haven, United States	
15	2:36.8		Alfred Nakache	France	6 July 1941	-	Marseille, France	
-	2:35.6	^{[b]}	Joe Verdeur	United States	5 April 1946	-	Bainbridge, United States	
-	2:35.0	^{[b]}	Joe Verdeur	United States	15 February 1947	-	New Haven, United States	
-	2:32.0	^{[b]}	Joe Verdeur	United States	14 February 1948	-	New Haven, United States	
-	2:30.5	^{[b]}	Joe Verdeur	United States	2 April 1948	-	New Haven, United States	
-	2:30.0	^{[b]}	Joe Verdeur	United States	28 June 1948	-	New Haven, United States	
-	2:36.3	^{[a]}	Joe Verdeur	United States	10 July 1948	-	Detroit, United States	
-	2:28.3	^{[b]}	Joe Verdeur	United States	15 February 1950	-	New Haven, United States	
-	2:34.4	^{[c]}	Herbert Klein	Germany	13 August 1950	-	Göppingen, West Germany	
-	2:27.3	^{[b]}	Herbert Klein	Germany	9 June 1951	-	Munich, West Germany	
-	2:34.4	=, ^{[c]}	John Davies	Australia	1 August 1952	-	Helsinki, Finland	
16	2:37.4		Knud Gleie	Denmark	14 February 1953	-	Copenhagen, Denmark	
-	2:36.6	^{[d]}	Masaru Furukawa	Japan	10 April 1954	-	Tokyo, Japan	
-	2:35.4	^{[d]}	Masaru Furukawa	Japan	10 April 1954	-	Tokyo, Japan	
-	2:35.2	^{[d]}	Mamoru Tanaka	Japan	17 September 1954	-	Tokyo, Japan	
-	2:33.7	^{[d]}	Masaru Furukawa	Japan	5 August 1955	-	Tokyo, Japan	
-	2:31.0	^{[d]}	Masaru Furukawa	Japan	1 October 1955	-	Tokyo, Japan	
17	2:36.5		Terry Gathercole	Australia	28 June 1958	-	Townsville, Australia	
18	2:33.6		Chet Jastremski	United States	28 July 1961	-	Tokyo, Japan	
19	2:29.6		Chet Jastremski	United States	19 August 1961	-	Los Angeles, United States	
20	2:28.2		Chet Jastremski	United States	30 August 1964	-	New York City, United States	
21	2:27.8		Ian O'Brien	Australia	15 October 1964	Olympic Games	Tokyo, Japan	
22	2:27.4		Vladimir Kosinsky	Soviet Union	3 April 1968	-	Tallinn, Soviet Union	
23	2:26.5		Nikolai Pankin	Soviet Union	22 March 1969	-	Minsk, Soviet Union	
24	2:25.4		Nikolai Pankin	Soviet Union	19 April 1969	-	Magdeburg, East Germany	
25	2:23.5		Brian Job	United States	22 August 1970	AAU National Championships	Los Angeles, United States	
26	2:22.79		John Hencken	United States	5 August 1972	US Olympic Trials	Chicago, United States	
27	2:21.55		John Hencken	United States	2 September 1972	Olympic Games	Munich, West Germany	
28	2:20.52		John Hencken	United States	24 August 1973	US National Championships	Louisville, United States	
29	2:19.28		David Wilkie	Great Britain	6 September 1973	World Championships	Belgrade, Yugoslavia	
30	2:18.93		John Hencken	United States	24 August 1974	AAU National Championships	Concord, United States	
31	2:18.21		John Hencken	United States	1 September 1974	USA vs GDR Dual Meet	Concord, United States	
32	2:15.11		David Wilkie	Great Britain	24 July 1976	Olympic Games	Montreal, Canada	
33	2:14.77		Victor Davis	Canada	5 August 1982	World Championships	Guayaquil, Ecuador	
34	2:14.58		Victor Davis	Canada	17 June 1984	-	Etobicoke, Canada	
35	2:13.34		Victor Davis	Canada	2 August 1984	Olympic Games	Los Angeles, United States	
36	2:12.90		Mike Barrowman	United States	4 August 1989	US National Championships	Los Angeles, United States	
36	2:12.90	=	Nick Gillingham	Great Britain	19 August 1989	European Championships	Bonn, West Germany	
38	2:12.89		Mike Barrowman	United States	20 August 1989	Pan Pacific Championships	Tokyo, Japan	
39	2:11.53		Mike Barrowman	United States	20 July 1990	Goodwill Games	Seattle, United States	
40	2:11.23		Mike Barrowman	United States	11 January 1991	World Championships	Perth, Australia	
41	2:10.60		Mike Barrowman	United States	13 August 1991	US National Championships	Fort Lauderdale, United States	
42	2:10.16		Mike Barrowman	United States	29 July 1992	Olympic Games	Barcelona, Spain	
43	2:09.97		Kosuke Kitajima	Japan	2 October 2002	Asian Games	Busan, South Korea	
44	2:09.52		Dimitri Komornikov	Russia	15 June 2003	Mare Nostrum	Barcelona, Spain	
45	2:09.42		Kosuke Kitajima	Japan	24 July 2003	World Championships	Barcelona, Spain	
46	2:09.04		Brendan Hansen	United States	11 July 2004	US Olympic Trials	Long Beach, United States	
47	2:08.74		Brendan Hansen	United States	5 August 2006	US National Championships	Irvine, United States	
48	2:08.50		Brendan Hansen	United States	21 August 2006	Pan Pacific Championships	Victoria, Canada	
49	2:07.51		Kosuke Kitajima	Japan	8 June 2008	Japan Open	Tokyo, Japan	
50	2:07.31	sf	Christian Sprenger	Australia	30 July 2009	World Championships	Rome, Italy	
51	2:07.28		Dániel Gyurta	Hungary	1 August 2012	Olympic Games	London, United Kingdom	
52	2:07.01		Akihiro Yamaguchi	Japan	15 September 2012	Japanese Sports Festival	Gifu, Japan	
53	2:06.67		Ippei Watanabe	Japan	29 January 2017	Kosuke Kitajima Cup	Tokyo, Japan	
53	2:06.67	sf, =	Matthew Wilson	Australia	25 July 2019	World Championships	Gwangju, South Korea	
55	2:06.12		Anton Chupkov	Russia	26 July 2019	World Championships	Gwangju, South Korea	
56	2:05.95		Zac Stubblety-Cook	Australia	22 May 2022	Australian Championships	Adelaide, Australia	
57	2:05.48		Qin Haiyang	China	27 July 2023	World Championships	Fukuoka, Japan	
58	2:04.83		Shin Ohashi	Japan	24 September 2026	Asian Games	Tokyo, Japan	

==== Notes ====
1. Record was set using a butterfly technique and was nullified in 1953.
2. Record was set in a 25 m pool and was annulled after World Aquatics required 50 m pools to be used.
3. After the records set in a 25 m pool were nullified, the world record was reverted to Herbert Klein's mark from 1950, which John Davies equaled in 1952. However, these records were also later annulled because they employed a butterfly technique.
4. Masaru Furukawa and Mamoru Tanaka set their world records by swimming most of the race while underwater. Their records were annulled in 1956.

=== Men short course ===
#	Time	Name	Nationality	Date	Meet	Location	Ref
1	2:07.93	Nick Gillingham	Great Britain	20 October 1991	-	Birmingham, United Kingdom	
2	2:07.80	Philip Rogers	Australia	28 August 1993	Australian Championships	Melbourne, Australia	
3	2:07.79	Andrey Korneyev	Russia	20 January 1998	World Cup	Paris, France	
4	2:07.59	Roman Sludnov	Russia	19 March 2000	World Championships	Athens, Greece	
5	2:06.40	Ed Moses	United States	25 March 2000	NCAA Division I Championships	Minneapolis, United States	
6	2:04.37	Ed Moses	United States	18 January 2002	World Cup	Paris, France	
7	2:03.28	Ed Moses	United States	22 January 2002	World Cup	Stockholm, Sweden	
8	2:03.17	Ed Moses	United States	26 January 2002	World Cup	Berlin, Germany	
9	2:02.92	Ed Moses	United States	17 January 2004	World Cup	Berlin, Germany	
10	2:01.98	Christian Sprenger	Australia	10 August 2009	Australian Championships	Hobart, Australia	
11	2:00.67	Dániel Gyurta	Hungary	13 December 2009	European Championships	Istanbul, Turkey	
12	2:00.48	Dániel Gyurta	Hungary	31 August 2014	World Cup	Dubai, United Arab Emirates	
13	2:00.44	Marco Koch	Germany	20 November 2016	German Championships	Berlin, Germany	
14	2:00.16	Kirill Prigoda	Russia	13 December 2018	World Championships	Hangzhou, China	
15	1:59.52	Caspar Corbeau	Netherlands	25 October 2025	World Cup	Toronto, Canada	

=== Women long course ===
#	Time		Name	Nationality	Date	Meet	Location	Ref
1	3:38.2		Ellie Van Den Bogaert	Belgium	7 August 1921	-	Antwerp, Belgium	
2	3:34.6		Ellie Van Den Bogaert	Belgium	6 May 1922	-	Brussels, Belgium	
3	3:31.4		Ellie Van Den Bogaert	Belgium	4 October 1922	-	Antwerp, Belgium	
4	3:20.4		Irene Gilbert	Great Britain	18 June 1923	-	Rotherham, United Kingdom	
5	3:20.2		Erna Murray	Germany	5 April 1925	-	Leipzig, Germany	
6	3:19.1		Brita Hazelius	Sweden	11 August 1926	-	Stockholm, Sweden	
7	3:18.4		Mietje Baron	Netherlands	24 October 1926	-	Brussels, Belgium	
8	3:16.6		Else Jacobsen	Denmark	20 August 1927	-	Oslo, Norway	
9	3:15.8		Charlotte Mühe	Germany	15 April 1928	-	Magdeburg, Germany	
10	3:11.2		Mietje Baron	Netherlands	22 April 1928	-	Rotterdam, Netherlands	
10	3:11.2	=	Charlotte Mühe	Germany	15 July 1928	-	Berlin, Germany	
12	3:10.6		Margery Hinton	Great Britain	20 July 1931	-	Manchester, United Kingdom	
13	3:08.4		Clare Dennis	Australia	18 January 1932	-	Sydney, Australia	
14	3:08.2		Lisa Rocke	Germany	21 April 1932	-	Leipzig, Germany	
15	3:03.4		Else Jacobsen	Denmark	11 May 1932	-	Stockholm, Sweden	
16	3:00.4		Hideko Maehata	Japan	30 September 1933	-	Tokyo, Japan	
17	3:00.2		Jopie Waalberg	Netherlands	11 May 1937	-	Amsterdam, Netherlands	
18	2:58.0		Jopie Waalberg	Netherlands	27 June 1937	-	Zaandijk, Netherlands	
19	2:56.9		Jopie Waalberg	Netherlands	2 October 1937	-	Ghent, Belgium	
20	2:56.0		Maria Lenk	Brazil	8 November 1939	-	Rio de Janeiro, Brazil	
-	2:55.5		Anni Kapell	United States	19 March 1941	-	Düsseldorf, Germany	
-	2:52.6		Nel van Vliet	Netherlands	17 August 1946	-	Bilthoven, Netherlands	
-	2:51.9		Nel van Vliet	Netherlands	29 March 1947	-	Amsterdam, Netherlands	
-	2:49.2		Nel van Vliet	Netherlands	20 July 1947	-	Hilversum, Netherlands	
-	2:48.8		Éva Novák	Hungary	21 October 1950	-	Székesfehérvár, Hungary	
-	2:48.5		Éva Novák	Hungary	5 May 1951	-	Moscow, Soviet Union	
-	2:46.4		Ada den Haan	Netherlands	13 November 1956	-	Naarden, Netherlands	
21	2:52.6		Ada den Haan	Netherlands	18 May 1957	Netherlands vs Great Britain International	Blackpool, United Kingdom	
22	2:51.9		Ada den Haan	Netherlands	3 August 1957	-	Rhenen, Netherlands	
23	2:51.3		Ada den Haan	Netherlands	4 August 1957	-	Rhenen, Netherlands	
24	2:50.3		Anita Lonsbrough	Great Britain	25 July 1959	Netherlands vs Great Britain International	Waalwijk, Netherlands	
25	2:50.2		Wiltrud Urselmann	Germany	6 June 1960	-	Aachen, West Germany	
26	2:49.5		Anita Lonsbrough	Great Britain	27 August 1960	Olympic Games	Rome, Italy	
27	2:48.0		Karin Beyer	East Germany	5 August 1961	-	Budapest, Hungary	
28	2:47.7		Galina Prozumenshchikova	Soviet Union	11 April 1964	-	Blackpool, United Kingdom	
29	2:45.4		Galina Prozumenshchikova	Soviet Union	17 May 1964	-	East Berlin, East Germany	
30	2:45.3		Galina Prozumenshchikova	Soviet Union	12 September 1965	-	Groningen, Netherlands	
31	2:43.0		Irina Pozdnyakova	Soviet Union	16 July 1966	-	Moscow, Soviet Union	
32	2:40.8		Galina Prozumenshchikova	Soviet Union	22 August 1966	European Championships	Utrecht, Netherlands	
33	2:40.5		Catie Ball	United States	9 July 1967	Santa Clara Invitational	Santa Clara, United States	
34	2:39.5		Catie Ball	United States	20 August 1967	AAU National Championships	Philadelphia, United States	
35	2:38.5		Catie Ball	United States	26 August 1968	US Olympic Trials	Los Angeles, United States	
36	2:37.89		Anne-Katrin Schott	East Germany	6 July 1974	GDR National Championships	Rostock, East Germany	
37	2:37.44	h	Karla Linke	East Germany	19 August 1974	European Championships	Vienna, Austria	
38	2:34.99		Karla Linke	East Germany	19 August 1974	European Championships	Vienna, Austria	
39	2:33.35		Marina Koshevaya	Soviet Union	21 July 1976	Olympic Games	Montreal, Canada	
40	2:33.32		Yulia Bogdanova	Soviet Union	7 April 1978	-	Leningrad, Soviet Union	
41	2:33.11	h	Lina Kačiušytė	Soviet Union	24 August 1978	World Championships	West Berlin, West Germany	
42	2:31.42		Lina Kačiušytė	Soviet Union	24 August 1978	World Championships	West Berlin, West Germany	
43	2:31.09		Svetlana Varganova	Soviet Union	30 March 1979	USSR vs GDR Duel	Minsk, Soviet Union	
44	2:28.36		Lina Kačiušytė	Soviet Union	6 April 1979	USSR vs GDR Junior Meet	Potsdam, East Germany	
45	2:28.33		Silke Hörner	East Germany	5 June 1985	-	Leipzig, East Germany	
46	2:28.20		Sylvia Gerasch	East Germany	1 March 1986	-	Leningrad, Soviet Union	
47	2:27.40		Silke Hörner	East Germany	18 August 1986	World Championships	Madrid, Spain	
48	2:27.27		Allison Higson	Canada	28 May 1988	-	Montreal, Canada	
49	2:26.71		Silke Hörner	East Germany	21 September 1988	Olympic Games	Seoul, South Korea	
50	2:25.92	h	Anita Nall	United States	2 March 1992	US Olympic Trials	Indianapolis, United States	
51	2:25.35		Anita Nall	United States	2 March 1992	US Olympic Trials	Indianapolis, United States	
52	2:24.76		Rebecca Brown	Australia	15 March 1994	Australian Championships	Brisbane, Australia	
53	2:24.69	h	Penelope Heyns	South Africa	17 July 1999	Janet Evans Invitational	Los Angeles, United States	
54	2:24.51		Penelope Heyns	South Africa	17 July 1999	Janet Evans Invitational	Los Angeles, United States	
55	2:24.42	sf	Penelope Heyns	South Africa	26 August 1999	Pan Pacific Championships	Sydney, Australia	
56	2:23.64		Penelope Heyns	South Africa	27 August 1999	Pan Pacific Championships	Sydney, Australia	
57	2:22.99		Qi Hui	China	13 April 2001	Chinese National Championships	Hangzhou, China	
57	2:22.99	=	Amanda Beard	United States	25 July 2003	World Championships	Barcelona, Spain	
59	2:22.96		Leisel Jones	Australia	10 July 2004	Swimming Australia Grand Prix	Brisbane, Australia	
60	2:22.44		Amanda Beard	United States	12 July 2004	US Olympic Trials	Long Beach, United States	
61	2:21.72		Leisel Jones	Australia	29 July 2005	World Championships	Montreal, Canada	
62	2:20.54		Leisel Jones	Australia	1 February 2006	Australian Championships	Melbourne, Australia	
63	2:20.22		Rebecca Soni	United States	15 August 2008	Olympic Games	Beijing, China	
64	2:20.12	sf	Annamay Pierse	Canada	29 July 2009	World Championships	Rome, Italy	
65	2:20.00	sf	Rebecca Soni	United States	1 August 2012	Olympic Games	London, United Kingdom	
66	2:19.59		Rebecca Soni	United States	2 August 2012	Olympic Games	London, United Kingdom	
67	2:19.11	sf	Rikke Møller Pedersen	Denmark	1 August 2013	World Championships	Barcelona, Spain	
68	2:18.95		Tatjana Schoenmaker	South Africa	30 July 2021	Olympic Games	Tokyo, Japan	
69	2:17.55		Evgeniia Chikunova	Russia	21 April 2023	Russian Championships	Kazan, Russia	

=== Women short course ===
#	Time		Name	Nationality	Date	Meet	Location	Ref
1	2:22.92		Susanne Bornike	East Germany	12 February 1989	World Cup	Bonn, West Germany	
2	2:22.89	h	Dai Guohong	China	3 December 1993	World Championships	Palma de Mallorca, Spain	
3	2:21.99		Dai Guohong	China	3 December 1993	World Championships	Palma de Mallorca, Spain	
4	2:20.85		Samantha Riley	Australia	1 December 1995	World Championships	Rio de Janeiro, Brazil	
5	2:20.22		Masami Tanaka	Japan	2 April 1999	World Championships	Hong Kong	
6	2:19.25		Qi Hui	China	28 January 2001	World Cup	Paris, France	
7	2:18.86		Qi Hui	China	2 December 2002	World Cup	Shanghai, China	
8	2:17.75		Leisel Jones	Australia	29 November 2003	World Cup	Melbourne, Australia	
9	2:17.50		Annamay Pierse	Canada	14 March 2009	Canadian Spring Nationals	Toronto, Canada	
10	2:16.83		Annamay Pierse	Canada	7 August 2009	British Grand Prix	Leeds, United Kingdom	
11	2:15.42		Leisel Jones	Australia	15 November 2009	World Cup	Berlin, Germany	
12	2:14.57		Rebecca Soni	United States	18 December 2009	Duel in the Pool	Manchester, United Kingdom	
-	2:14.39	(Note: Rescinded in May 2014 due to doping violation.)	Yuliya Yefimova	Russia	14 December 2013	European Championships	Herning, Denmark	
13	2:14.16		Kate Douglass	United States	24 October 2024	World Cup	Incheon, South Korea	
14	2:12.72		Kate Douglass	United States	31 October 2024	World Cup	Singapore	
15	2:12.50		Kate Douglass	United States	13 December 2024	World Championships	Budapest, Hungary	

== All-time top 25 ==
Tables show data for two definitions of "Top 25" - the top 25 200 m breaststroke times and the top 25 athletes:
- denotes top performance for athletes in the top 25 200 m breaststroke times
- denotes lesser performances, still in the top 25 200 m breaststroke times, by repeat athletes
- denotes top performance (only) for other top 25 athletes who fall outside the top 25 200 m breaststroke times

=== Men long course ===
- Correct as of September 2026

Ath.#	Perf.#	Time	Athlete	Nation	Date	Place	Ref.
1	1	2:04.83	Shin Ohashi	Japan	24 September 2026	Tokyo	
2	2	2:05.48	Qin Haiyang	China	28 July 2023	Fukuoka	
3	3	2:05.85	Léon Marchand	France	31 July 2024	Paris	
4	4	2:05.95	Zac Stubblety-Cook	Australia	19 May 2022	Adelaide	
5	5	2:06.12	Anton Chupkov	Russia	26 July 2019	Gwangju	
	6	2:06.28	Stubblety-Cook #2		15 June 2021	Adelaide	
	7	2:06.38	Stubblety-Cook #3		29 July 2021	Tokyo	
6	8	2:06.40	Shoma Sato	Japan	7 April 2021	Tokyo	
	8	2:06.40	Stubblety-Cook #4		28 July 2023	Fukuoka	
7	10	2:06.54	Matthew Fallon	United States	19 June 2024	Indianapolis	
	11	2:06.59	Marchand #2		11 June 2023	Rennes	
	11	2:06.59	Ohashi #2		21 March 2026	Tokyo	
8	13	2:06.67	Ippei Watanabe	Japan	29 January 2017	Tokyo	
8	13	2:06.67	Matthew Wilson	Australia	25 July 2019	Gwangju	
	15	2:06.68	Wilson #2		26 July 2019	Gwangju	
	16	2:06.72	Stubblety-Cook #5		22 June 2022	Budapest	
	17	2:06.73	Watanabe #2		26 July 2019	Gwangju	
	18	2:06.74	Sato #2		7 February 2021	Tokyo	
	19	2:06.78	Sato #3		24 January 2021	Tokyo	
	20	2:06.79	Stubblety-Cook #6		31 July 2024	Paris	
	21	2:06.80	Chupkov #2		6 August 2018	Glasgow	
	22	2:06.83	Chupkov #3		25 July 2019	Gwangju	
10	23	2:06.85	Arno Kamminga	Netherlands	4 December 2020	Rotterdam	
	24	2:06.91	Ohashi #3		21 July 2025	Kusatsu	
	25	2:06.94	Watanabe #3		21 March 2024	Tokyo	
11		2:07.01	Akihiro Yamaguchi	Japan	15 September 2012	Gifu	
12		2:07.07	Yamato Fukasawa	Japan	17 February 2024	Chiba	
12		2:07.07	Yu Hanaguruma	Japan	21 March 2024	Tokyo	
14		2:07.13	Matti Mattsson	Finland	29 July 2021	Tokyo	
15		2:07.17	Josh Prenot	United States	30 June 2016	Omaha	
16		2:07.18	Yasuhiro Koseki	Japan	16 April 2017	Nagoya	
17		2:07.23	Dániel Gyurta	Hungary	2 August 2013	Barcelona	
18		2:07.25	Kirill Prigoda	Russia	21 July 2022	Kazan	
19		2:07.30	Ross Murdoch	Great Britain	24 July 2014	Glasgow	
20		2:07.31	Christian Sprenger	Australia	30 July 2009	Rome	
21		2:07.32	Filip Nowacki	Great Britain	22 August 2025	Otopeni	
22		2:07.41	Kevin Cordes	United States	28 June 2017	Indianapolis	
23		2:07.42	Eric Shanteau	United States	30 July 2009	Rome	
24		2:07.43	Michael Jamieson	Great Britain	1 August 2012	London	
25		2:07.46	Dmitriy Balandin	Kazakhstan	10 August 2016	Rio de Janeiro	

=== Men short course ===
- Correct as of November 2026

Ath.#	Perf.#	Time	Athlete	Nation	Date	Place	Ref.
1	1	1:59.52	Caspar Corbeau	Netherlands	25 October 2025	Toronto	
2	2	2:00.12	Shin Ohashi	Japan	12 October 2026	Saga	
3	3	2:00.16	Kirill Prigoda	Russia	13 December 2018	Hangzhou	
4	4	2:00.26	Yusei Imaizumi	Japan	12 October 2026	Saga	
5	5	2:00.35	Daiya Seto	Japan	16 December 2022	Melbourne	
6	6	2:00.44	Marco Koch	Germany	20 November 2016	Berlin	
7	7	2:00.48	Dániel Gyurta	Hungary	31 August 2014	Dubai	
	8	2:00.53	Koch #2		3 December 2015	Netanya	
	9	2:00.58	Koch #3		1 November 2020	Budapest	
	10	2:00.67	Gyurta #2		13 December 2009	Istanbul	
	11	2:00.72	Gyurta #3		15 December 2013	Herning	
	12	2:00.81	Koch #4		26 October 2020	Budapest	
8	13	2:00.86	Carles Coll	Spain	5 December 2025	Lublin	
	14	2:01.06	Gyurta #4		27 August 2014	Doha	
	15	2:01.11	Prigoda #2		14 December 2017	Copenhagen	
9	16	2:01.15	Qin Haiyang	China	13 December 2018	Hangzhou	
	17	2:01.18	Prigoda #3		19 November 2017	Singapore	
	18	2:01.20	Prigoda #4		14 November 2020	Budapest	
	19	2:01.21	Koch #5		8 December 2016	Windsor	
	20	2:01.24	Prigoda #5		4 October 2017	Doha	
	20	2:01.24	Ohashi #2		29 March 2026	Chiba	
	22	2:01.27	Corbeau #2		5 December 2025	Lublin	
	23	2:01.28	Koch #6		31 August 2014	Dubai	
	24	2:01.30	Gyurta #5		9 November 2013	Tokyo	
	24	2:01.30	Seto #2		19 November 2017	Singapore	
	24	2:01.30	Prigoda #6		11 November 2018	Tokyo	
10		2:01.43	Michael Jamieson	Great Britain	15 December 2013	Herning	
10		2:01.43	Arno Kamminga	Netherlands	17 December 2020	Amsterdam	
12		2:01.57	Anton Chupkov	Russia	11 November 2018	Tokyo	
13		2:01.60	Nic Fink	United States	16 December 2022	Melbourne	
14		2:01.65	Anton McKee	Iceland	1 November 2020	Budapest	
15		2:01.67	Joshua Yong	Australia	20 October 2024	Shanghai	
16		2:01.70	Ippei Watanabe	Japan	23 October 2022	Tokyo	
17		2:01.73	Ilya Shymanovich	Belarus	6 November 2021	Kazan	
17		2:01.73	Luke Barr	United States	3 October 2026	Baku	
19		2:01.78	Yasuhiro Koseki	Japan	27 October 2019	Tokyo	
20		2:01.85	Mikhail Dorinov	Russia	14 December 2017	Copenhagen	
21		2:01.91	Aleksandr Zhigalov	Russia	23 November 2024	Saint Petersburg	
22		2:01.98	Christian Sprenger	Australia	10 August 2009	Hobart	
23		2:02.00	Léon Marchand	France	12 October 2025	Carmel	
24		2:02.01	Yamato Fukasawa	Japan	13 December 2024	Budapest	
25		2:02.07	Daniil Pisetsky	Russia	9 November 2026	Saint Petersburg	

=== Women long course ===
- Correct as of August 2026

Ath.#	Perf.#	Time	Athlete	Nation	Date	Place	Ref.
1	1	2:17.55	Evgeniia Chikunova	Russia	21 April 2023	Kazan	
2	2	2:18.50	Kate Douglass	United States	1 August 2025	Singapore	
3	3	2:18.95	Tatjana Smith	South Africa	30 July 2021	Tokyo	
	4	2:18.98	Chikunova #2		27 July 2024	Yekaterinburg	
	5	2:19.01	Smith #2		10 April 2024	Gqeberha	
4	6	2:19.11	Rikke Møller Pedersen	Denmark	1 August 2013	Barcelona	
	7	2:19.16	Smith #3		28 July 2021	Tokyo	
	8	2:19.24	Douglass #2		1 August 2024	Paris	
	9	2:19.30	Douglass #3		13 January 2024	Knoxville	
	10	2:19.32	Chikunova #3		14 August 2026	Paris	
	11	2:19.33	Smith #4		29 July 2021	Tokyo	
5	12	2:19.41	Yuliya Yefimova	Russia	2 August 2013	Barcelona	
	13	2:19.46	Douglass #4		20 June 2024	Indianapolis	
6	14	2:19.59	Rebecca Soni	United States	2 August 2012	London	
	15	2:19.60	Smith #5		1 August 2024	Paris	
	16	2:19.61	Møller Pedersen #2		13 April 2014	Eindhoven	
7	17	2:19.64	Viktoria Zeynep Gunes	Turkey	30 August 2015	Singapore	
	17	2:19.64	Yefimova #2		28 July 2017	Budapest	
8	19	2:19.65	Rie Kaneto	Japan	9 April 2016	Tokyo	
	20	2:19.66	Douglass #5		19 June 2024	Indianapolis	
	21	2:19.67	Møller Pedersen #3		12 June 2014	Canet-en-Roussillon	
9	22	2:19.70	Angharad Evans	Great Britain	16 April 2026	London	
	23	2:19.71	Chikunova #4		30 July 2023	Kazan	
	24	2:19.74	Chikunova #5		19 April 2024	Kazan	
	24	2:19.74	Douglass #6		31 July 2024	Paris	
10		2:19.81	Tes Schouten	Netherlands	16 February 2024	Doha	
11		2:19.92	Lilly King	United States	30 July 2021	Tokyo	
12		2:20.12	Annamay Pierse	Canada	30 July 2009	Rome	
13		2:20.54	Leisel Jones	Australia	1 February 2006	Melbourne	
14		2:20.72	Satomi Suzuki	Japan	2 August 2012	London	
15		2:20.77	Annie Lazor	United States	19 May 2019	Bloomington	
16		2:20.89	Molly Renshaw	Great Britain	15 April 2021	London	
17		2:20.90	Kanako Watanabe	Japan	12 April 2015	Tokyo	
18		2:21.37	Qi Hui	China	17 October 2009	Jinan	
19		2:21.45	Taylor McKeown	Australia	11 April 2016	Adelaide	
20		2:21.62	Nađa Higl	Serbia	31 July 2009	Rome	
21		2:21.69	Abbie Wood	Great Britain	15 April 2021	London	
22		2:21.74	Micah Sumrall	United States	1 August 2013	Barcelona	
23		2:21.73	Alexanne Lepage	Canada	14 August 2026	Irvine	
24		2:21.77	Bethany Galat	United States	28 July 2017	Budapest	
25		2:21.85	Reona Aoki	Japan	8 April 2018	Tokyo	

=== Women short course ===
- Correct as of October 2026

Ath.#	Perf.#	Time	Athlete	Nation	Date	Place	Ref.
1	1	2:12.50	Kate Douglass	United States	13 December 2024	Budapest	
	2	2:12.72	Douglass #2		31 October 2024	Singapore	
	3	2:13.45	Douglass #3		23 October 2025	Toronto	
	4	2:13.97	Douglass #4		10 October 2025	Carmel	
	5	2:14.12	Douglass #5		29 October 2026	Westmont	
	6	2:14.16	Douglass #6		24 October 2024	Incheon	
2	7	2:14.39	Yulia Yefimova	Russia	13 December 2013	Herning	
3	8	2:14.57	Rebecca Soni	United States	18 December 2009	Manchester	
	8	2:14.57	Douglass #7		17 October 2025	Westmont	
4	10	2:14.70	Evgeniia Chikunova	Russia	25 November 2022	Kazan	
	11	2:15.14	Chikunova #2		13 December 2024	Budapest	
5	12	2:15.21	Rikke Møller Pedersen	Denmark	13 December 2013	Herning	
6	13	2:15.42	Leisel Jones	Australia	15 November 2009	Berlin	
7	14	2:15.56	Lilly King	United States	21 November 2020	Budapest	
	15	2:15.62	Yefimova #2		28 September 2018	Eindhoven	
	16	2:15.65	Douglass #8		16 October 2026	Charlottesville	
	17	2:15.74	Douglass #9		23 October 2025	Toronto	
8	18	2:15.76	Rie Kaneto	Japan	9 October 2016	Doha	
	19	2:15.77	Douglass #10		16 December 2022	Melbourne	
	20	2:15.80	King #2		5 November 2020	Budapest	
	21	2:15.91	Kaneto #2		1 October 2016	Beijing	
	22	2:15.93	Møller Pedersen #2		11 August 2013	Berlin	
	23	2:15.96	Douglass #11		18 October 2024	Shanghai	
	24	2:15.99	Douglass #12		10 October 2025	Carmel	
	25	2:16.04	King #3		26 October 2020	Budapest	
9		2:16.09	Tes Schouten	Netherlands	8 December 2023	Otopeni	
10		2:16.33	Annie Lazor	United States	21 November 2020	Budapest	
11		2:16.51	Emily Escobedo	United States	5 November 2020	Budapest	
12		2:16.83	Alex Walsh	United States	13 December 2024	Budapest	
12		2:16.83	Annamay Pierse	Canada	7 August 2009	Leeds	
14		2:16.92	Kanako Watanabe	Japan	7 December 2014	Doha	
15		2:16.93	Laura Sogar	United States	16 December 2012	Istanbul	
16		2:17.00	Kelsey Wog	Canada	25 November 2023	Winnipeg	
17		2:17.10	Jocelyn Ulyett	Great Britain	6 December 2019	Sheffield	
18		2:17.25	Mio Motegi	Japan	16 February 2014	Tokyo	
19		2:17.30	Alina Zmushka	Belarus	13 December 2024	Budapest	
20		2:17.50	Katy Freeman	United States	18 December 2009	Manchester	
21		2:17.52	Nađa Higl	Serbia	11 December 2009	Istanbul	
22		2:17.69	Kotomi Kato	Japan	12 October 2026	Saga	
23		2:17.75	Sydney Pickrem	Canada	21 November 2020	Budapest	
24		2:17.80	Molly Renshaw	Great Britain	14 November 2020	Budapest	
24		2:17.80	Anna Elendt	Germany	10 October 2025	Carmel	

== Olympic champions ==
=== Men ===
Edition	Winner	Time	Notes	Ref.
(United Kingdom) London 1908	Frederick Holman (GBR)	3:09.2	WR	
(Sweden) Stockholm 1912	Walter Bathe (GER)	3:01.8	OR	
(Belgium) Antwerp 1920	Håkan Malmrot (SWE)	3:04.4		
(France) Paris 1924	Robert Skelton (USA)	2:56.6	(Note: Robert Skelton set an Olympic record of 2:56.0 in the heats.)	
(Netherlands) Amsterdam 1928	Yoshiyuki Tsuruta (JPN)	2:48.8	OR	
(United States) Los Angeles 1932	Yoshiyuki Tsuruta (JPN)	2:45.4	(Note: Reizo Koike set an Olympic record of 2:44.9 in the semifinals.)	
(Nazi Germany) Berlin 1936	Tetsuo Hamuro (JPN)	2:41.5	OR	
(United Kingdom) London 1948	Joe Verdeur (USA)	2:39.3	OR	
(Finland) Helsinki 1952	John Davies (AUS)	2:34.4	OR	
(Australia) Melbourne 1956	Masaru Furukawa (JPN)	2:34.7		
(Italy) Rome 1960	Bill Mulliken (USA)	2:37.4		
(Japan) Tokyo 1964	Ian O'Brien (AUS)	2:27.8	WR	
Mexico City 1968	Felipe Muñoz (MEX)	2:28.7		
(West Germany) Munich 1972	John Hencken (USA)	2:21.55	WR	
(Canada) Montreal 1976	David Wilkie (GBR)	2:15.11	WR	
(Soviet Union) Moscow 1980	Robertas Žulpa (URS)	2:15.85		
(United States) Los Angeles 1984	Victor Davis (CAN)	2:13.34	WR	
(South Korea) Seoul 1988	József Szabó (HUN)	2:13.52		
(Spain) Barcelona 1992	Mike Barrowman (USA)	2:10.16	WR	
(United States) Atlanta 1996	Norbert Rózsa (HUN)	2:12.57		
(Australia) Sydney 2000	Domenico Fioravanti (ITA)	2:10.87		
(Greece) Athens 2004	Kosuke Kitajima (JPN)	2:09.44	OR	
(China) Beijing 2008	Kosuke Kitajima (JPN)	2:07.64	OR	
(United Kingdom) London 2012	Dániel Gyurta (HUN)	2:07.28	WR	
(Brazil) Rio de Janeiro 2016	Dmitriy Balandin (KAZ)	2:07.46	(Note: Ippei Watanabe set an Olympic record of 2:07.22 in the semifinals.)	
(Japan) Tokyo 2020	Zac Stubblety-Cook (AUS)	2:06.38	OR	
(France) Paris 2024	Léon Marchand (FRA)	2:05.85	OR	

=== Women ===
Edition	Winner	Time	Notes	Ref.
(France) Paris 1924	Lucy Morton (GBR)	3:33.2	(Note: Agnes Geraghty set an Olympic record of 3:27.6 in the semifinals.)	
(Netherlands) Amsterdam 1928	Hilde Schrader (GER)	3:12.6	(Note: Hilde Schrader tied the world record of 3:11.2 in the semifinals.)	
(United States) Los Angeles 1932	Clare Dennis (AUS)	3:06.3	OR	
(Nazi Germany) Berlin 1936	Hideko Maehata (JPN)	3:01.9	OR	
(United Kingdom) London 1948	Nel van Vliet (NED)	2:57.2	(Note: Nel van Vliet set an Olympic record of 2:57.0 in the semifinals.)	
(Finland) Helsinki 1952	Éva Székely (HUN)	2:51.7	OR (Note: Éva Székely completed the race by using a butterfly technique. Butterfly was later split into a separate discipline, and Székely's Olympic record was rescinded.)	
(Australia) Melbourne 1956	Ursula Happe (GER)	2:53.1	OR	
(Italy) Rome 1960	Anita Lonsbrough (GBR)	2:49.5	WR	
(Japan) Tokyo 1964	Galina Prozumenshchikova (URS)	2:46.4	OR	
Mexico City 1968	Sharon Wichman (USA)	2:44.4	OR	
(West Germany) Munich 1972	Beverley Whitfield (AUS)	2:41.71	OR	
(Canada) Montreal 1976	Marina Kosheveya (URS)	2:33.35	WR	
(Soviet Union) Moscow 1980	Lina Kačiušytė (URS)	2:29.54	OR	
(United States) Los Angeles 1984	Anne Ottenbrite (CAN)	2:30.38		
(South Korea) Seoul 1988	Silke Hörner (GDR)	2:26.71	WR	
(Spain) Barcelona 1992	Kyoko Iwasaki (JPN)	2:26.65	OR	
(United States) Atlanta 1996	Penelope Heyns (RSA)	2:25.41	OR	
(Australia) Sydney 2000	Ágnes Kovács (HUN)	2:24.35	(Note: Ágnes Kovács set an Olympic record of 2:24.03 in the semifinals.)	
(Greece) Athens 2004	Amanda Beard (USA)	2:23.37	OR	
(China) Beijing 2008	Rebecca Soni (USA)	2:20.22	WR	
(United Kingdom) London 2012	Rebecca Soni (USA)	2:19.59	WR	
(Brazil) Rio de Janeiro 2016	Rie Kaneto (JPN)	2:20.30		
(Japan) Tokyo 2020	Tatjana Schoenmaker (RSA)	2:18.95	WR	
(France) Paris 2024	Kate Douglass (USA)	2:19.24		

== World champions (long course) ==
=== Men ===
Edition	Winner	Time	Notes	Ref.
(Socialist Federal Republic of Yugoslavia) Belgrade 1973	David Wilkie (GBR)	2:19.28	WR	
(Colombia) Cali 1975	David Wilkie (GBR)	2:18.23	CR	
(West Germany) West Berlin 1978	Nicholas Nevid (USA)	2:16.37	CR	
(Ecuador) Guayaquil 1982	Victor Davis (CAN)	2:14.77	CR	
(Spain) Madrid 1986	József Szabó (HUN)	2:14.27	CR	
(Australia) Perth 1991	Mike Barrowman (USA)	2:11.23	WR	
(Italy) Rome 1994	Norbert Rózsa (HUN)	2:12.81		
(Australia) Perth 1998	Kurt Grote (USA)	2:13.40		
(Japan) Fukuoka 2001	Brendan Hansen (USA)	2:10.69	CR	
(Spain) Barcelona 2003	Kosuke Kitajima (JPN)	2:09.42	WR	
(Canada) Montreal 2005	Brendan Hansen (USA)	2:09.85		
(Australia) Melbourne 2007	Kosuke Kitajima (JPN)	2:09.80		
(Italy) Rome 2009	Dániel Gyurta (HUN)	2:07.64	(Note: Christian Sprenger set a world record of 2:07.31 in the semifinals.)	
(China) Shanghai 2011	Dániel Gyurta (HUN)	2:08.41		
(Spain) Barcelona 2013	Dániel Gyurta (HUN)	2:07.23	CR	
(Russia) Kazan 2015	Marco Koch (GER)	2:07.76		
(Hungary) Budapest 2017	Anton Chupkov (RUS)	2:06.96	CR	
(South Korea) Gwangju 2019	Anton Chupkov (RUS)	2:06.12	WR	
(Hungary) Budapest 2022	Zac Stubblety-Cook (AUS)	2:07.07		
(Japan) Fukuoka 2023	Qin Haiyang (CHN)	2:05.48	WR	
(Qatar) Doha 2024	Dong Zhihao (CHN)	2:07.94		
Singapore 2025	Qin Haiyang (CHN)	2:07.41		

=== Women ===
Edition	Winner	Time	Notes	Ref.
(Socialist Federal Republic of Yugoslavia) Belgrade 1973	Renate Vogel (GDR)	2:40.01	CR	
(Colombia) Cali 1975	Hannelore Anke (GDR)	2:37.25	CR	
(West Germany) West Berlin 1978	Lina Kačiušytė (URS)	2:31.42	WR	
(Ecuador) Guayaquil 1982	Svetlana Varganova (URS)	2:28.82	CR	
(Spain) Madrid 1986	Silke Hörner (GDR)	2:27.40	WR	
(Australia) Perth 1991	Yelena Volkova (URS)	2:29.53		
(Italy) Rome 1994	Samantha Riley (AUS)	2:26.87	CR	
(Australia) Perth 1998	Ágnes Kovács (HUN)	2:25.45	CR	
(Japan) Fukuoka 2001	Ágnes Kovács (HUN)	2:24.90	CR	
(Spain) Barcelona 2003	Amanda Beard (USA)	2:22.99	=WR	
(Canada) Montreal 2005	Leisel Jones (AUS)	2:21.72	WR	
(Australia) Melbourne 2007	Leisel Jones (AUS)	2:21.84		
(Italy) Rome 2009	Nađa Higl (SRB)	2:21.62	(Note: Annamay Pierse set a world record of 2:20.12 in the semifinals.)	
(China) Shanghai 2011	Rebecca Soni (USA)	2:21.47		
(Spain) Barcelona 2013	Yuliya Yefimova (RUS)	2:19.41	(Note: Rikke Møller Pedersen set a world record of 2:19.11 in the semifinals.)	
(Russia) Kazan 2015	Kanako Watanabe (JPN)	2:21.15		
(Hungary) Budapest 2017	Yuliya Yefimova (RUS)	2:19.64		
(South Korea) Gwangju 2019	Yuliya Yefimova (RUS)	2:20.17		
(Hungary) Budapest 2022	Lilly King (USA)	2:22.41		
(Japan) Fukuoka 2023	Tatjana Schoenmaker (RSA)	2:20.80		
(Qatar) Doha 2024	Tes Schouten (NED)	2:19.81		
Singapore 2025	Kate Douglass (USA)	2:18.50	CR	

== World champions (short course) ==
=== Men ===
Edition	Winner	Time	Notes	Ref.
(Spain) Palma de Mallorca 1993	Nick Gillingham (GBR)	2:07.91	CR	
(Brazil) Rio de Janeiro 1995	Wang Yiwu (CHN)	2:11.11		
(Sweden) Gothenburg 1997	Aleksandr Gukov (BLR)	2:09.25		
Hong Kong 1999	Phil Rogers (AUS)	2:08.72		
(Greece) Athens 2000	Roman Sludnov (RUS)	2:07.59	WR	
(Russia) Moscow 2002	Jim Piper (AUS)	2:07.16	CR	
(United States) Indianapolis 2004	Brendan Hansen (USA)	2:04.98	CR	
(China) Shanghai 2006	Vladislav Polyakov (KAZ)	2:06.95		
(United Kingdom) Manchester 2008	Kristopher Gilchrist (GBR)	2:06.18		
(United Arab Emirates) Dubai 2010	Naoya Tomita (JPN)	2:03.12	CR	
(Turkey) Istanbul 2012	Dániel Gyurta (HUN)	2:01.35	CR	
(Qatar) Doha 2014	Dániel Gyurta (HUN)	2:01.49		
(Canada) Windsor 2016	Marco Koch (GER)	2:01.21	CR	
(China) Hangzhou 2018	Kirill Prigoda (RUS)	2:00.16	WR	
(United Arab Emirates) Abu Dhabi 2021	Nic Fink (USA)	2:02.28		
(Australia) Melbourne 2022	Daiya Seto (JPN)	2:00.35		
(Hungary) Budapest 2024	Carles Coll (ESP)	2:01.55		

=== Women ===
Edition	Winner	Time	Notes	Ref.
(Spain) Palma de Mallorca 1993	Dai Guohong (CHN)	2:21.99	WR	
(Brazil) Rio de Janeiro 1995	Samantha Riley (AUS)	2:20.85	WR	
(Sweden) Gothenburg 1997	Kristy Ellem (AUS)	2:22.68		
Hong Kong 1999	Masami Tanaka (JPN)	2:20.22	WR	
(Greece) Athens 2000	Rebecca Brown (AUS)	2:23.41		
(Russia) Moscow 2002	Qi Hui (CHN)	2:20.91		
(United States) Indianapolis 2004	Brooke Hanson (AUS)	2:21.68		
(China) Shanghai 2006	Qi Hui (CHN)	2:20.72		
(United Kingdom) Manchester 2008	Suzaan van Biljon (RSA)	2:18.73	CR	
(United Arab Emirates) Dubai 2010	Rebecca Soni (USA)	2:16.39	CR	
(Turkey) Istanbul 2012	Rikke Møller Pedersen (DEN)	2:16.08	CR	
(Qatar) Doha 2014	Kanako Watanabe (JPN)	2:16.92		
(Canada) Windsor 2016	Molly Renshaw (GBR)	2:18.51		
(China) Hangzhou 2018	Annie Lazor (USA)	2:18.32		
(United Arab Emirates) Abu Dhabi 2021	Emily Escobedo (USA)	2:17.85		
(Australia) Melbourne 2022	Kate Douglass (USA)	2:15.77	CR	
(Hungary) Budapest 2024	Kate Douglass (USA)	2:12.50	WR	
