= Margaret Hoffman =

American swimmer (1911–1991)

Margaret Pierce Hoffman
- Hoffman in 1932

Personal information
- Full name: Margaret Pierce Hoffman
- Nickname: "Peg"
- National team: United States
- Born: June 19, 1911 Wilkes Barre, Pennsylvania, U.S.
- Died: March 25, 1991 (aged 79) Indiana, Pennsylvania, U.S.
- Height: 5 ft 7 in (1.70 m)
- Weight: 125 lb (57 kg) (1932)
- Education: Mount Holyoke College '33; Temple University

Sport
- Sport: Swimming
- Strokes: Breaststroke
- Club: Scranton Swimming Assoc. (SSA)
- Coach: Hoadley Hagen (SSA); Wright B. Jones (SSA); Hi Antrim (SSA); Bob Kiphuth ('28 Olympics)

Margaret Pierce Hoffman (June 19, 1911 – March 25, 1991) was an American competition swimmer who represented the United States in the 200 meter breaststroke at the 1928 Summer Olympics in Amsterdam and the 1932 Summer Olympics in Los Angeles. After completing her education at Mount Holyoke and Temple University, she chaired the Physical Education Department at Wyoming Seminary, her former prep school, and later served as a mathematics teacher at the Shipley school in Bryn Mawr, Pennsylvania.

== Early life ==
Hoffman was born on June 19, 1911, in Wilkes Barre, Pennsylvania, to Mr. Edwin A. Hoffman, who would work as an executive for the Wilkes-Barre Railway Corporation, and Louise Witherow Hoffman. She attended Kingston's Wyoming Seminary, a college preparatory school very close to her birthplace in Wilkes Barre, Pennsylvania. At Wyoming Seminary, she played basketball and field hockey, but would excel as a swimmer. Around 1927, at a Water Polo-like contest between her Wilkes Barre YMCA team and the recently formed Scranton Swimming Association at the Wilkes Barre YMCA Pool, Hoffman's swimming ability was discovered by Scranton Coach Hoadley Hagen who admired her speed and agility. She soon was signed to swim for the Scranton Swimming Association. At Scranton's Weston Field Pool, she would break a record for the medley relay and tie a local record for the 100-yard freestyle. In the summer of 1928, the Scranton Swimming Association and the Scranton Times sponsored Hoffman to attend the Olympic trials at Far Rockaway on New York's Long Island.

Phil Bunnel, a Captain of the Yale Swimming team, had formerly swum for Hy Antrim, a Scranton Swimming Association Coach. Antrim asked Bunnel to bring his Yale swim coach and U.S. Women's Olympic swim team coach Bob Kiphuth, to come to Scranton to observe Hoffman swim breaststroke. Kiphuth, said of Hoffman, "She is one of the finest breaststrokers I have ever seen, with her smooth, long, wide arm sweep." However, Kiphuth modified Hoffman's stroke to make her arm action faster with a short choppy movement, rather than her former wide arm pull, and modified her kick to increase its efficiency.pull, and modified her kick to increase its efficiency.

=== Scranton Swimming Association ===
Hoffman was described as having a "natural athletic ability", being picked in late 1927 as a student with "good free style prospect" by the Scranton Swimming Association, where she trained and was managed by Chief Coach Hoadley Hagen, and coaches Wright B. Jones, and Hi Antrim. Hagen founded the Scranton Swimming Association, served as the Director of the Scranton Bureau of Recreation, and coached High School track and field in addition to swimming. Jones was a Scranton public school teacher and served as both coach and treasurer of the Scranton Swim Association. On March 30, 1929, Hoffman competed in the AAU Middle Atlantic championships in the 200-yard breaststroke Atlantic City, winning the event, and setting a meet record of 3:17.

With numerous achievements swimming breaststroke, she won the AAU outdoor championship in the 220 yard breaststroke in both 1930 and 1933, and was the indoor AAU championship in the 110 yard breaststroke in both 1931 and 1933. She set a world record, though perhaps unofficial, in the 200-yard breaststroke of 2.55.8 at an international meet between the United States and Hungary in New York, in July 1932.

Hoffman continued to compete and occasionally train with the Scranton Swimming Association during her years at Mount Holyoke particularly in the summers, and was limited in her training as Mount Holyoke lacked a women's swim team. She graduated the Wyoming Seminary in 1929, and began at Mount Holyoke College in Massachusetts in the fall of that year.

== Olympics ==
=== 1928 Amsterdam ===
Having just turned seventeen while still a student at Wyoming Seminary, she qualified in breaststroke for the 1928 Olympics at the trials at Rockaway Park in Long Island, New York in early July, 1928. Swimming at the Rockaway Playland Pool, Hoffman finished third in the 200-meter breaststroke behind Agnes Geraghty of the New York Women's Swimming Association, and Jane Fauntz of the Illinois Athletic Club.

Travelling with the team, she then competed in the 1928 Summer Olympics in Amsterdam finishing third in her first heat, and fifth in the final of the women's 200-meter breaststroke event with a time of 3:19.2. Though she finished out of medal contention, she was the only American point winner in the event at Amsterdam, and the first American to finish the final. The 1928 Olympic women's team was managed by Hall of Fame Coach Bob Kiphuth of Yale University.

=== 1932 Los Angeles ===
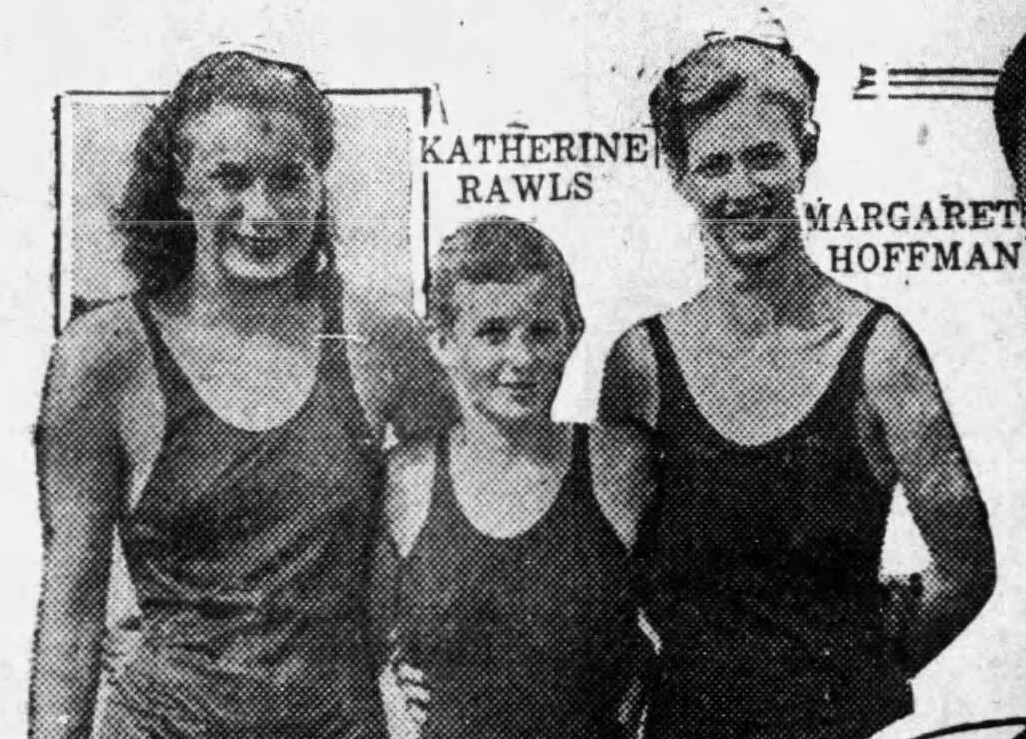
Hoffman (right), with 1932 Olympic swimming medalists Helene Madison and Katherine Rawls

Four years later, as a Senior at Mt. Holyoke, Hoffman won both the first and third (final) heats of the 200-meter breaststroke, at the 1932 Olympic trials in Los Angeles in mid-July, 1932, setting a new American record of 3:12:3 in the process and qualifying her for the Olympic team.

She would not medal in the 1932 Olympic 200-meter breaststroke event held on the afternoon of August 9, 1932, finishing fifth with a time of 3:11.8. Claire Dennis of Australia took the gold setting a new Olympic and world record of 3:06.3, breaking her own prior record of 3:08.2. Hideko Maehata of Japan swam a very close second place time of 3:06.4 to take the silver medal.

== Later life ==
Though she was winding down her swimming career, in March, 1933, Hoffman received a varsity letter from Mt. Holyoke in basketball. Hoffman completed her undergraduate degree from Mt. Holyoke with a major in economics in 1933. In June 1934, she did statistical work for the Department of Planning and Research at the newly formed National Recovery Administration in Washington, D.C. for around fifteen years. In a subsequent position she was lumber buyer, primarily sugar-pine for a Sacramento, California-based Company. She later earned a Masters from Temple University. Pursuing a career in education, by the 1950's she coached basketball and chaired the Physical Education Department at Wyoming Seminary, which she had formerly attended, before becoming a mathematics teacher at the Shipley school, a prep school for Bryn Mawr College, in Bryn Mawr, Pennsylvania. In November, 1959, she gave lectures to teachers on methods for teaching mathematics to elementary students.

In regional honors, she was a Scranton Tribune Sports Hall of Fame inductee in 1969, and a Wyoming Seminary Varsity Club Sports Hall of Fame inductee on May 31, 1974.

She died on March 25, 1991 at Beacon Manor, a retirement home, in Indiana, Pennsylvania. She was survived by her sister Elizabeth. Margaret had lived some of her retired life in Falmouth, Maine. Funeral services were held at the Robinson-Lytle Funeral Home in Indiana, Pennsylvania.
