= Marie Baron =

Dutch swimmer and diver (1908–1948)

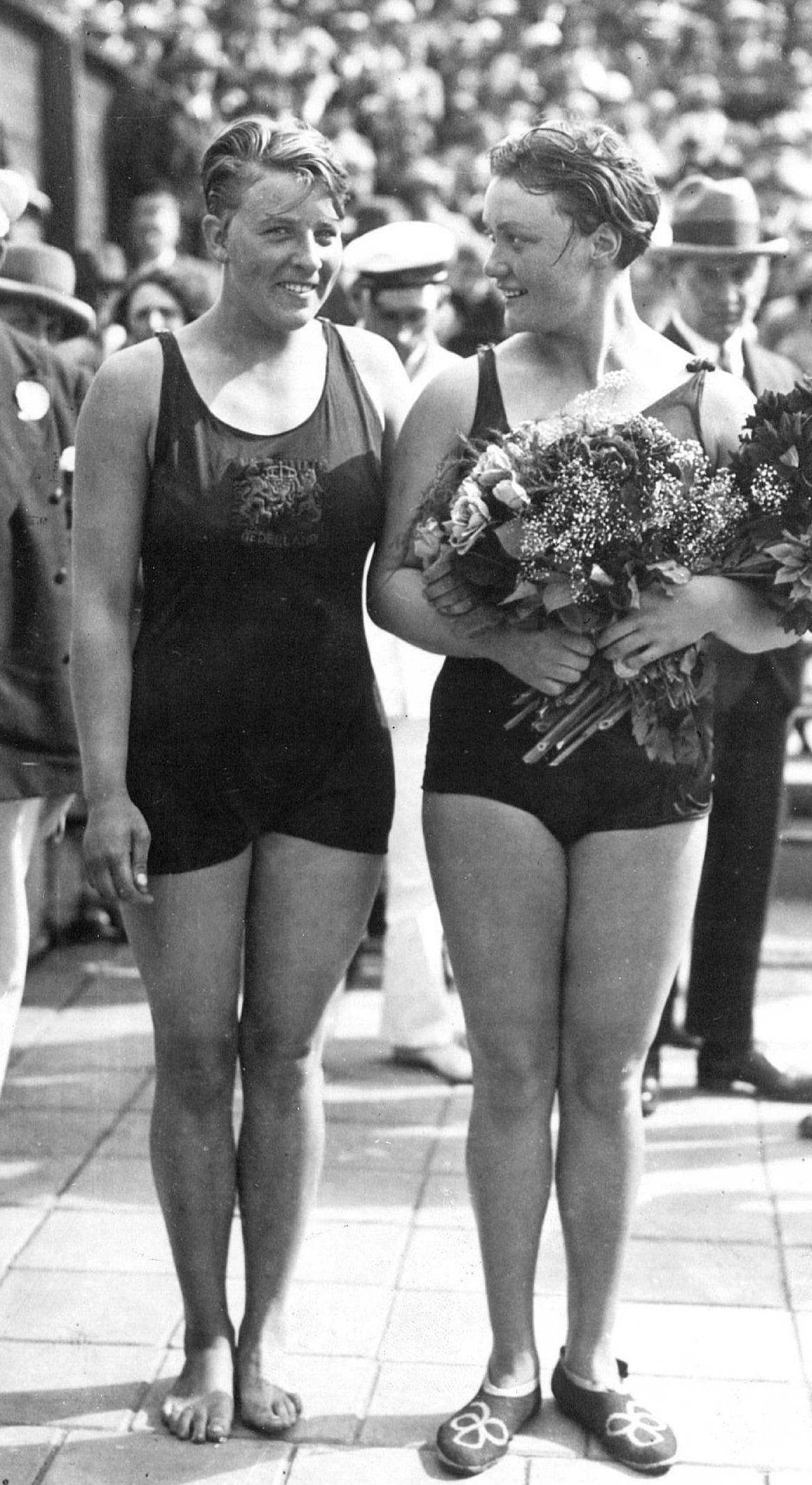
- Marie Baron (left) and her rival Hilde Schrader at the 1928 Olympics

Personal information
- Born: 5 February 1908 Rotterdam, Netherlands
- Died: 23 July 1948 (aged 40) Rotterdam, Netherlands

Sport
- Sport: Swimming
- Club: ODZ, Rotterdam
Medal record
Representing the Netherlands
Olympic Games
Silver medal – second place	1928 Amsterdam	200 m breaststroke

Mietje "Marie" Baron (5 February 1908 – 23 July 1948) was a Dutch swimmer and diver who competed at the 1924 and 1928 Olympics. In 1924 she was sixth in the 4 × 100 m freestyle relay. She was disqualified in the first round of the 200 m breaststroke event, as the judges believed she touched the wall with one hand instead of two hands at one of the turns. Meanwhile, her time of 3:22.6 was several seconds ahead of the gold medalist's. Four years later she swam 3:15.2, but this was only enough for a silver medal, as her main rival Germany's Hilde Schrader clocked 3:12.6. At the 1928 Games Baron also competed in the 10 m platform diving event and finished fourth.

From 1926 to 1928 Baron set four breaststroke world records, two in the 200 m (3:18:40 on 24 October 1926 and 3:12:80 on 22 April 1928) and two in the obsolete 400 m event (6:54:80 on 20 March 1927 and 6:45:60 on 25 November 1928). In October 1929 she announced her engagement and retired from swimming. The following year she married Pieter Lourens de Puij.
