= Margaretha van Norden =

Dutch swimmer

Personal information
- Born: 9 October 1911 Zaandam, Netherlands
- Died: 6 August 1963 (aged 51) Rochester, New York, United States

Sport
- Sport: Swimming

Margaretha van Norden (9 October 1911 – 6 August 1963) was a Dutch swimmer. She competed in the women's 200 metre breaststroke event at the 1928 Summer Olympics.
