= Róża Kajzer =

Polish swimmer

Personal information
- Born: 3 September 1909 Zabrze, German Empire
- Died: 10 July 1977 (aged 67) Katowice, Poland

Sport
- Sport: Swimming

Róża Kajzer (3 September 1909 – 10 July 1977) was a Polish swimmer. She competed in the women's 200 metre breaststroke event at the 1928 Summer Olympics.
