= Cor van Gelder =

Dutch swimmer (1904–1969)

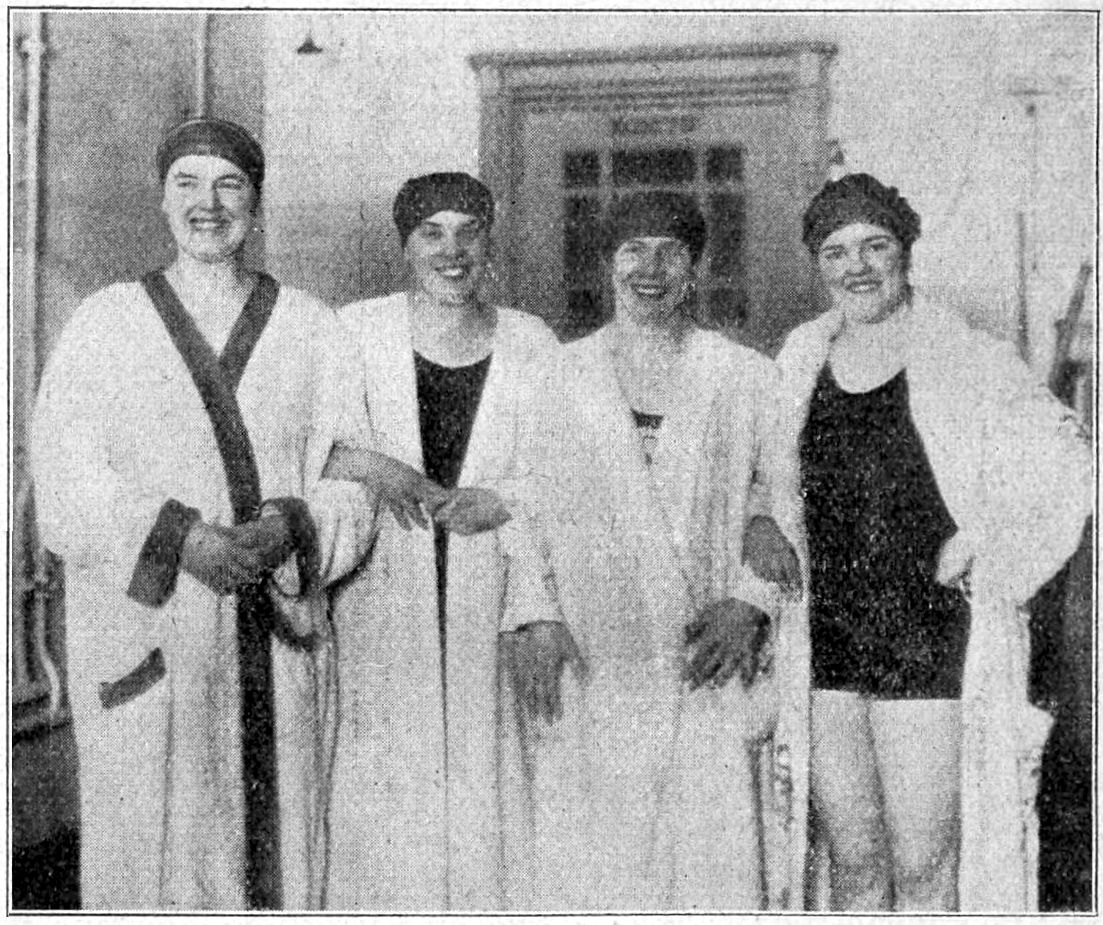
- Cornelia "Cor" van Gelder

Personal information
- Born: 17 April 1904 Rotterdam, Netherlands
- Died: 13 February 1969 (aged 64) The Hague, Netherlands

Sport
- Sport: Swimming

Cornelia "Cor" van Gelder (17 April 1904 – 13 February 1969) was a Dutch swimmer. She competed in the women's 200 metre breaststroke event at the 1928 Summer Olympics.
