= Elfriede Zimmermann =

German swimmer

Personal information
- Born: 1908 Berlin, Germany

Sport
- Sport: Swimming

Elfriede Zimmermann (born 1908, date of death unknown) was a German swimmer. She competed in the women's 200 metre breaststroke event at the 1928 Summer Olympics.
