= Masaru Furukawa =

Japanese swimmer (1936–1993)

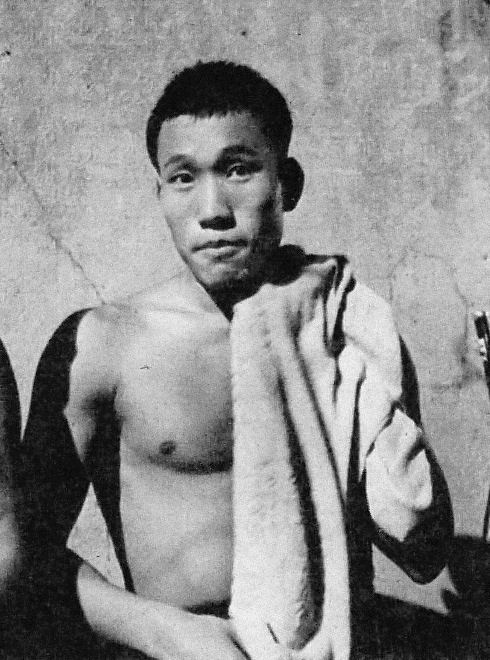
- Masaru Furukawa (1956)

Personal information
- Born: January 6, 1936 Hashimoto, Wakayama, Empire of Japan
- Died: November 21, 1993 (aged 57)
Medal record
Men's swimming
Representing Japan
Olympic Games
Gold medal – first place	1956 Melbourne	200 m breaststroke
Asian Games
Gold medal – first place	1958 Tokyo	200 m breaststroke
Gold medal – first place	1958 Tokyo	4×100 m medley
Silver medal – second place	1954 Manila	200 m breaststroke

Masaru Furukawa (古川 勝, Furukawa Masaru; January 6, 1936 – November 21, 1993) was a Japanese swimmer and Olympic champion. He competed at the 1956 Olympic Games in Melbourne, where he received a gold medal in the 200 m breaststroke.

== World records ==
Furukawa improved the world record of 200 metres breaststroke (long course) four times in 1954 and 1955, and his last record lasted until 1958.

== Awards ==
Furukawa was inducted into the International Swimming Hall of Fame in 1981.

== See also ==
- List of members of the International Swimming Hall of Fame
- World record progression 200 metres breaststroke
