= Marianne Gustafsson =

Swedish swimmer

Personal information
- Born: 25 February 1913 Eskilstuna, Sweden
- Died: 13 November 1999 (aged 86) Eskilstuna, Sweden

Sport
- Sport: Swimming

Marianne Gustafsson (25 February 1913 – 13 November 1999) was a Swedish swimmer. She competed in the women's 200 metre breaststroke event at the 1928 Summer Olympics.
