= Doris Thompson (swimmer) =

Australian swimmer

Personal information
- Full name: Dorothy Mary Thompson
- Born: 7 July 1909
- Died: 15 September 1983 (aged 74)

Sport
- Sport: Swimming

Doris Thompson (7 July 1909 – 15 September 1983) was an Australian swimmer. She competed in the women's 200 metre breaststroke event at the 1928 Summer Olympics.

In 1928 Thompson held the world record for 220 yards breaststroke, as well as being Australian champion breaststroker over all distances.
