= Clare Dennis =

Australian swimmer (1916–1971)

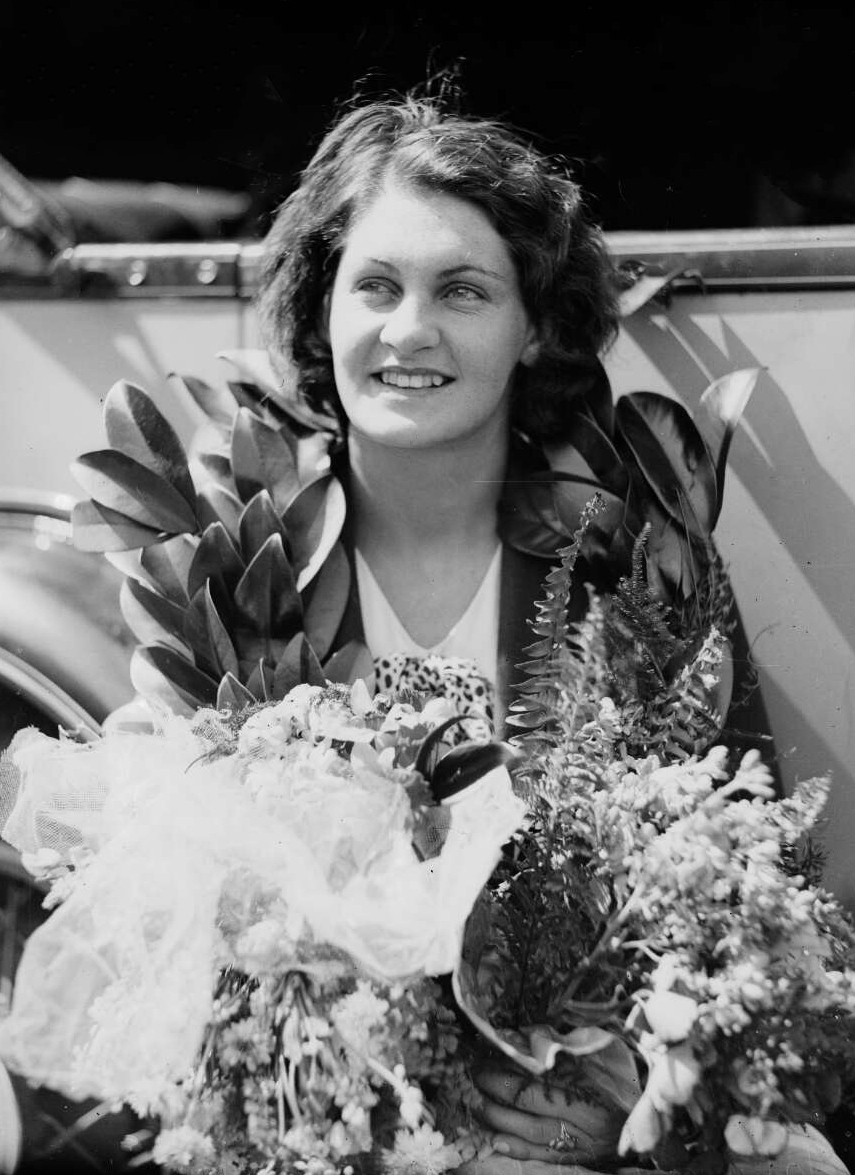
- Dennis in 1932

Personal information
- Full name: Clara Dennis
- Nickname: "Clare"
- National team: Australia
- Born: 7 March 1916 Burwood, New South Wales
- Died: 5 June 1971 (aged 55) Manly, New South Wales

Sport
- Sport: Swimming
- Strokes: Breaststroke
- Club: Sydney Ladies' Swimming Club
Medal record
Representing Australia
Olympic Games
Gold medal – first place	1932 Los Angeles	200 m breaststroke
British Empire Games
Gold medal – first place	1934 London	200 yd breaststroke

Clara "Clare" Dennis (7 March 1916 – 5 June 1971), later known by her married name Clare Golding, was an Australian breaststroke swimmer of the 1930s who won the gold medal in the 200-metre breaststroke at the 1932 Summer Olympics in Los Angeles, California.

== Early life ==
Born in Burwood, New South Wales (a suburb of Sydney) as one of six children of Alec Dennis, a policeman who acted as a police prosecutor, Clare and her siblings were taught to swim by their father, himself an amateur swimmer, after their family relocated from Burwood to Clovelly Beach. Dennis' sister Thora developed quickly into a competent competitive swimmer, and joined the Sydney Ladies' Swimming Club and was later selected for the 1928 Summer Olympics in Amsterdam, but was prevented from going on the grounds of being too young to travel alone overseas. Dennis pleaded with her father to let her join, which he agreed to on the condition that she first swim the 33 yards (approximately 30 metres) across Clovelly Bay. She managed this by pushing off the bottom of the ocean, disguising this with extravagant stroking. Her first lesson and race at the club ended in her having to be fished out of the pool after her endurance failed and the bottom of the pool was too deep to push off.

Dennis attended Randwick Primary School, where she acquired a reputation for being interested in sport rather than schoolwork. She spent large amounts of time playing cricket against the male students. Dennis initially swam as a freestyler, but converted to breaststroke at the age of 13. At her first New South Wales Championships in 1930, held at the Ramsgate Baths, she was disqualified after drifting out of her unmarked lane. The freestyle race was held four times due to multiple lane crossing. It was later discovered that the taps regulating the water flow had been accidentally left on. This created a current strong enough to push the swimmers towards one another. In the breaststroke event, held later, she set a State record, but was disqualified for a one-handed touch.

== Swimming career ==
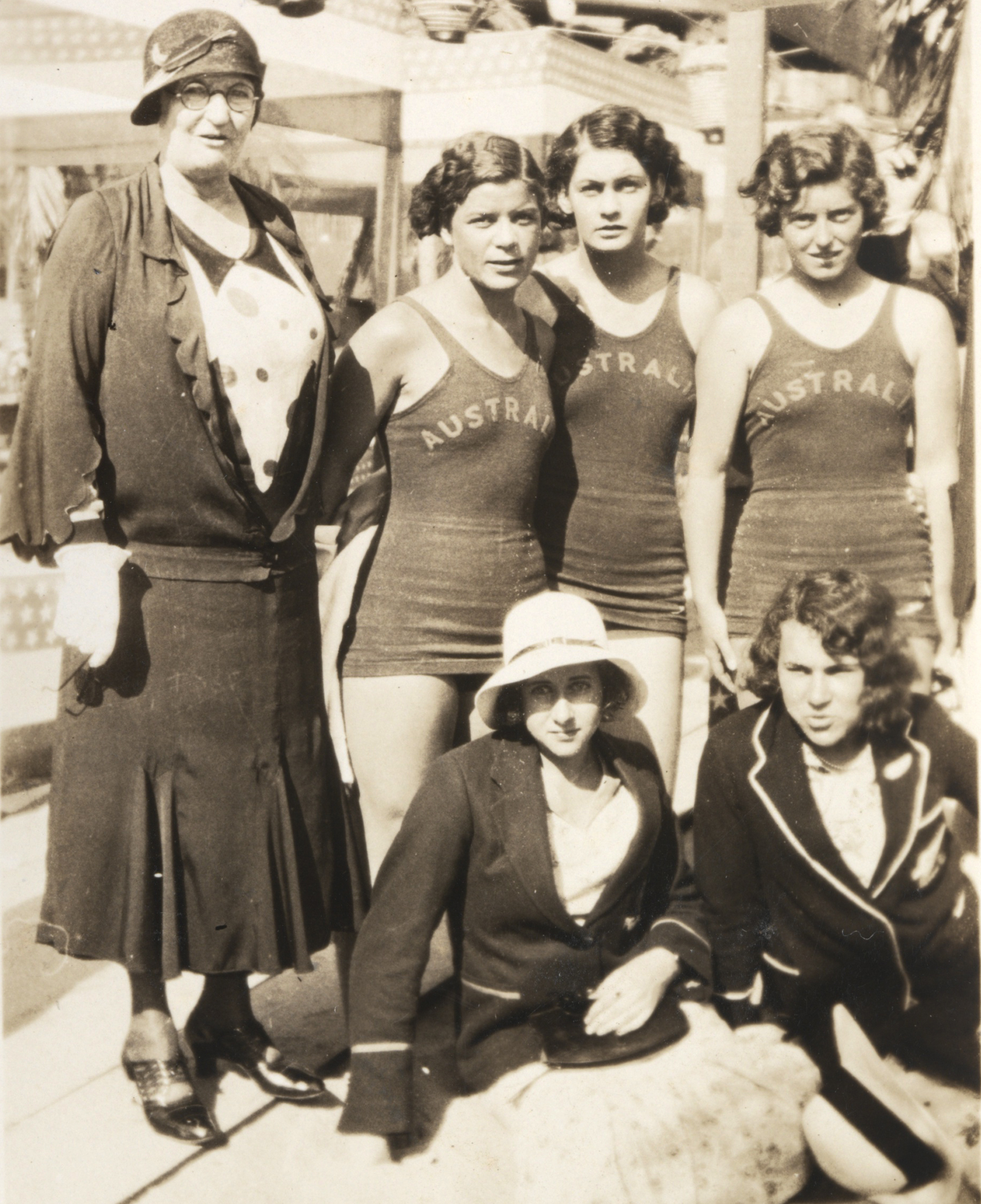
Dennis (middle in costume) with 1932 Australian women's Olympic swim squad & chaperone

In 1931 she won her first state and national title in the 220-yard breaststroke. She repeated this in 1933, 1934 and 1935, with the championships not being held in 1932, remaining unbeaten until her retirement in 1936. After her 1931 victory, her father died from a leaking heart valve. Dennis considered retiring, but her mother convinced her to continue.

In January 1932, Dennis broke the 110-yard Australian record and then the 200-metre world record, gaining automatic selection for the Olympic team at the age of 15. Due to financial difficulties caused by the Great Depression, Dennis managed to attend the Olympics only after assistance was rendered by the Police Department for travel and uniform costs. On arrival, Dennis was hit by illness and then contracted a toe infection after gashing it on the starting platform. Her chances took a boost when Lisa Rocke, who had claimed her 200 m breaststroke world record, was not sent to represent Germany.

Dennis won her heat of the 200-metre breaststroke, setting an Olympic record. She narrowly escaped disqualification when a protest was lodged against her "inappropriate" costume on the grounds that it exposed too much of her shoulder blade. Dennis changed her swimming style after the heats on the advice of American swimmer Buster Crabbe, who recommended she swim three strokes underwater after her starting dive before surfacing. Using her new technique, she touched in first place at every turn to claim the gold medal, 0.1 of a second faster than Japan's Hideko Maehata, improving on her previous Olympic record.

In 1933, Dennis beat her own Australian 220-yard breaststroke record, and in 1934 she captured gold in the 220-yard breaststroke at the 1934 British Empire Games in London. Though she successfully defended her national title in 1935, she was controversially omitted from the team for the 1936 Summer Olympics in Berlin, and subsequently retired.

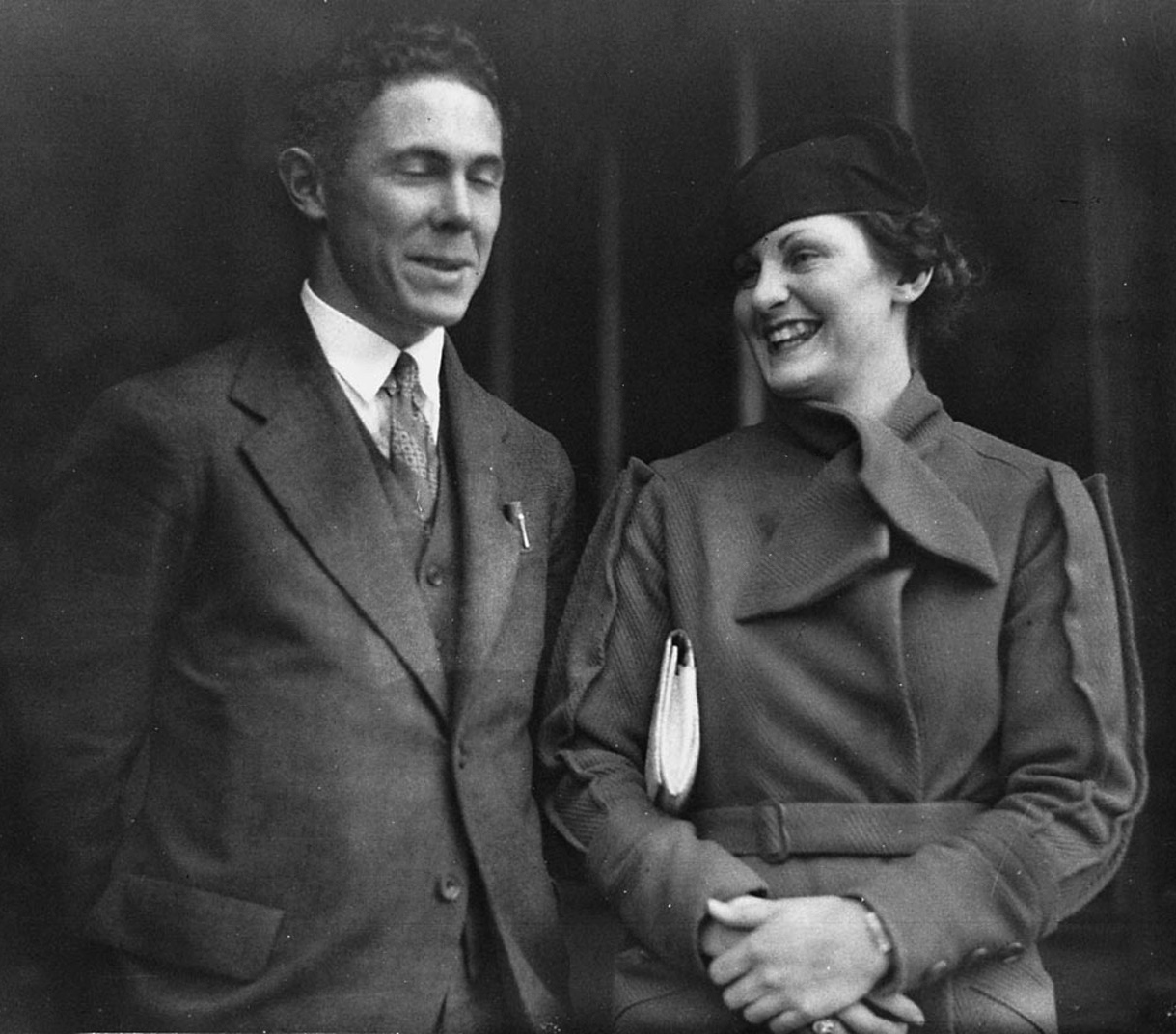
Golding and Dennis in 1934

== After swimming ==
Dennis met her future husband, George Golding, an Australian track and field athlete at the Olympics. He won gold at the 1930 British Empire Games and was the Australian 440-yard champion in 1934 and the 440-yard hurdles champion in 1932 and 1934. They were married in 1941. Dennis became a swimming coach and hairdresser, owning two salons.

She died in 1971 in Manly, New South Wales at the age of 55 from cancer, and was posthumously inducted into the International Swimming Hall of Fame in 1982.

== See also ==
- List of members of the International Swimming Hall of Fame
- List of Olympic medalists in swimming (women)
- World record progression 200 metres breaststroke

== Bibliography ==
- Andrews, Malcolm (2000). Australia at the Olympic Games. Sydney, New South Wales: ABC Books. pp. 128–129. ISBN 0-7333-0884-8.
- Howell, Max (1986). Aussie Gold. Albion, Queensland: Brooks Waterloo. pp. 53–56. ISBN 0-86440-680-0.
