= Charlotte Mühe =

German swimmer

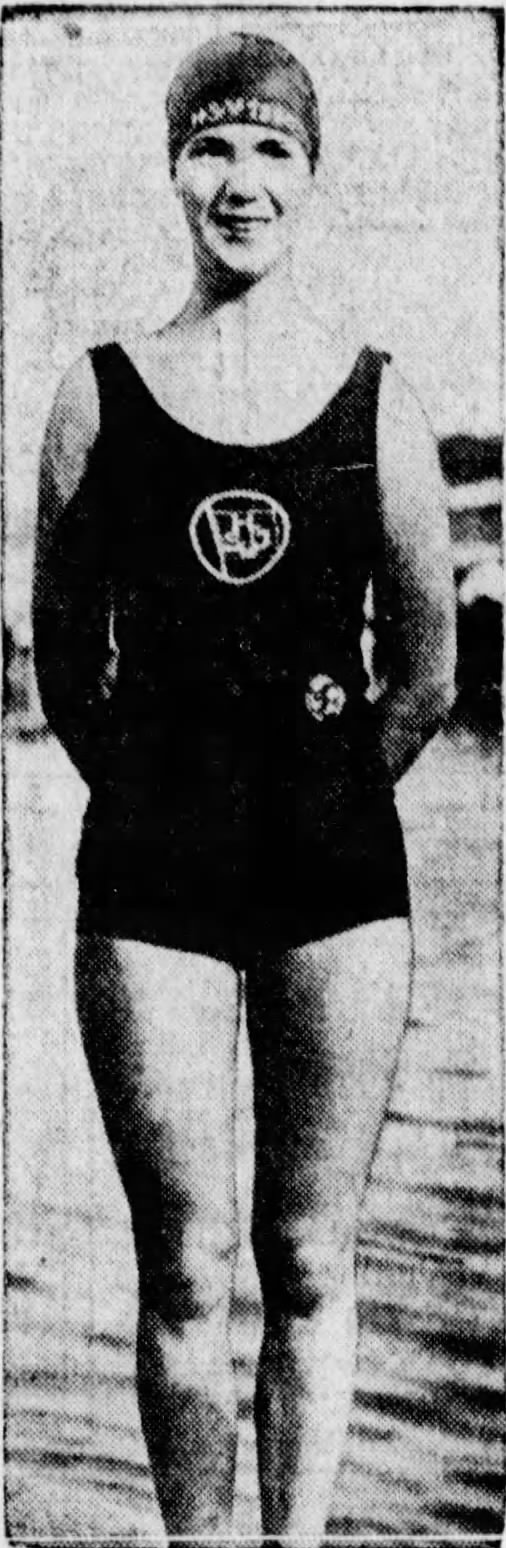
- Mühe in 1928

Personal information
- Nickname: Lotte
- Nationality: German
- Born: January 24, 1910 Uelzen, German Empire
- Died: January 10, 1981 (aged 70) Magdeburg, West Germany

Sport
- Sport: Swimming
- Strokes: Breaststroke
Medal record
Representing Germany
Olympic Games
Bronze medal – third place	1928 Amsterdam	200 m breaststroke
European Championships
Silver medal – second place	1927 Bologna	200 m breaststroke

Charlotte Mühe (January 24, 1910 – January 10, 1981) was a German swimmer who competed in the 1928 Summer Olympics.

In the 1928 Olympics she won a bronze medal in the 200 m breaststroke event.
