= George Garlick (footballer, born 1921) =

Australian rules footballer

Personal information
- Full name: George Garlick
- Born: 26 February 1921
- Died: 8 February 1993 (aged 71)
- Original team: Yarraville
- Height: 170 cm (5 ft 7 in)
- Weight: 79 kg (174 lb)

Playing career^{1}
Years	Club	Games (Goals)
1943–44	North Melbourne	8 (0)
- ^{1} Playing statistics correct to the end of 1944.

George Garlick (26 February 1921 – 8 February 1993) was an Australian rules footballer who played with North Melbourne in the Victorian Football League (VFL).
