= William Dodd (cricketer) =

English cricketer and police officer

Personal information
- Full name: William Thomas Francis Dodd
- Born: 8 March 1908; Steep, Hampshire, England
- Died: 13 February 1993 (aged 84); New Forest, Hampshire, England
- Batting: Left-handed
- Bowling: Slow left-arm orthodox

Domestic team information
- Years: Team
- 1931–1935: Hampshire

Career statistics
Competition	First-class
Matches	10
Runs scored	95
Batting average	6.78
100s/50s	–/–
Top score	31
Balls bowled	698
Wickets	10
Bowling average	32.10
5 wickets in innings	1
10 wickets in match	–
Best bowling	5/63
Catches/stumpings	3/–
- Source: Cricinfo, 21 January 2010

William Thomas Francis Dodd (8 March 1908 — 13 February 1993) was an English first-class cricketer and police officer.

Dodd was born in March 1908 at Steep, Hampshire. Dodd made his debut in first-class cricket for Hampshire against Yorkshire at Hull in the 1931 County Championship. He played first-class cricket for Hampshire until 1935, making ten appearances. A slow left-arm orthodox bowler, his first-class career was somewhat limited by the presence of Stuart Boyes in the Hampshire side, who was Hampshire's leading slow left-arm orthodox bowler of the time. In his ten first-class matches, he took 10 wickets at an average of 32.10; he took one five wicket haul, with figures of 5 for 63 against Middlesex in 1935. With the bat, he scored 95 runs with a highest score of 31. Outside of cricket, Dodd was a police officer in Southampton with the Southampton City Police. He died in the New Forest in February 1993.
