= 1993 FINA World Swimming Championships (25 m) – Women's 200 metre breaststroke =

These are the official results of the Women's 200 metres Breaststroke event at the 1993 FINA Short Course World Championships held in Palma de Mallorca, Spain.

== Finals ==
RANK	FINAL A	TIME
	Dai Guohong (CHN)	2:21.99 WR
	Hitomi Maehara (JPN)	2:24.45
	Samantha Riley (AUS)	2:24.75
4.	Brigitte Becue (BEL)	2:25.08
5.	Linley Frame (AUS)	2:26.20
6.	Lenka Maňhalová (CZE)	2:28.24
7.	Svitlana Bondarenko (UKR)	2:28.79
8.	Alenka Kejžar (SLO)	2:29.13

== Qualifying heats ==
RANK	HEATS RANKING	TIME
1.	Dai Guohong (CHN)	2:22.89
2.	Brigitte Becue (BEL)	2:25.46
3.	Hitomi Maehara (JPN)	2:27.33
4.	Samantha Riley (AUS)	2:28.65
5.	Lenka Maňhalová (CZE)	2:29.31
6.	Linley Frame (AUS)	2:29.62
7.	Svitlana Bondarenko (UKR)	2:29.84
8.	Alenka Kejžar (SLO)	2:30.54

== See also ==
- 1992 Women's Olympic Games 200m Breaststroke
- 1993 Women's European LC Championships 200m Breaststroke
