= Lisa Rocke =

German swimmer

Personal information
- Born: c. 1912 Magdeburg, German Empire

Sport
- Sport: Swimming
- Strokes: Breaststroke

Lisa Rocke (born c.1912) was a German swimmer who set a 200m world record for breaststroke for women in Berlin on 23 April 1932 with a time of 3 minutes 8.2 seconds. She was from Magdeburg.
