= Robert Skelton =

Robert Lumley Skelton (4 October 1896 – 11 August 1973) was a British newspaper editor.

Skelton grew up in Newcastle upon Tyne and attended Rutherford College. During World War I, he served in the Durham Light Infantry from 1914, but was seconded to the Royal Flying Corps as a pilot in 1918. After the war, he took up journalism, and became editor of the Natal Witness in 1928. Returning to the UK in 1933, he was appointed Managing Editor of the Daily Telegraph, serving until 1948, when he became editor of the News of the World. In later years, he served as chairman and managing director of Curzon-Grantham Advertising.
