= Brita Hazelius =

Swedish swimmer

Personal information
- Born: January 22, 1909 Copenhagen, Denmark
- Died: March 5, 1975 (aged 66) Gothenburg, Sweden

Sport
- Sport: Swimming

Brita Hazelius (later Johansson; January 22, 1909 – March 5, 1975) was a Swedish breaststroke swimmer who competed in the 1928 Summer Olympics.

She was born in Denmark and died in Gothenburg.

In 1928 she finished sixth in the 200 metre breaststroke event.
