= Paul Masino =

French gymnast

- Born: 28 September 1911 Lyon, France
- Died: 17 February 1993 (aged 81) Saint-Maur-des-Fossés, France

Gymnastics career
- Discipline: Men's artistic gymnastics
- Country represented: France

Paul Masino (28 September 1911 – 17 February 1993) was a French gymnast. He competed in eight events at the 1936 Summer Olympics held in Berlin, Germany. he finished 8th with the French team in the team all-around event, 70th in the individual all-around, and achieved individual rankings in other disciplines such as the floor exercise and vault
