= Alby Newell =

Australian rules footballer

Personal information
- Full name: Albert William Newell
- Born: 16 September 1921
- Died: 3 February 1993 (aged 71)
- Height: 174 cm (5 ft 9 in)
- Weight: 65 kg (143 lb)

Playing career^{1}
Years	Club	Games (Goals)
1939	South Melbourne	2 (0)
1946	Port Melbourne (VFA)	1 (0)
- ^{1} Playing statistics correct to the end of 1939.

Albert William Newell (16 September 1921 – 3 February 1993) was an Australian rules footballer who played for the South Melbourne Football Club in the Victorian Football League (VFL).
