= Swimming at the 1928 Summer Olympics – Women's 200 metre breaststroke =

Women's 200 metre breaststroke at the Games of the IX Olympiad
- Venue: Olympic Sports Park Swim Stadium
- Date: 7 August 1928 (heats); 8 August 1928 (semifinals); 9 August 1928 (final)
- Competitors: 21 from 12 nations
- Winning time: 3:12:6

Medalists
1st place, gold medalist(s)		Hilde Schrader	Germany
2nd place, silver medalist(s)		Marie Baron	Netherlands
3rd place, bronze medalist(s)		Charlotte Mühe	Germany

The women's 200 metre breaststroke was a swimming event held as part of the swimming at the 1928 Summer Olympics programme. It was the second appearance of the event, which was established in 1924. The competition was held from Tuesday to Thursday, 7 to 9 August 1928.

Twenty-one swimmers from twelve nations competed.

== Records ==
These were the standing world and Olympic records (in minutes) prior to the 1928 Summer Olympics.

World record	3:11.2	(Germany) Charlotte Mühe	Berlin (GER)	15 July 1928
Olympic record	3:27.6	(United States) Agnes Geraghty	Paris (FRA)	16 July 1924

In the first heat Hilde Schrader set a new Olympic record with 3:11.6 minutes. In the second semi-final she equalized the standing world record with 3:11.2 minutes.

== Results ==
=== Heats ===
Tuesday 7 August 1928: The fastest three in each heat advanced.

==== Heat 1 ====
Rank	Swimmer	Nation	Time	Notes
1	Hilde Schrader	Germany	3:11.6	Q, OR
2	Agnes Geraghty	United States	3:18.8	Q
3	Brita Hazelius	Sweden	3:21.6	Q
4	Cornelia van Gelder	Netherlands	Unknown	
5	Margery Hinton	Great Britain	Unknown	
6	Róża Kajzer	Poland	Unknown	

==== Heat 2 ====
Rank	Swimmer	Nation	Time	Notes
1	Charlotte Mühe	Germany	3:14.2	Q
2	Mietje Baron	Netherlands	3:20.2	Q
3	Margaret Hoffman	United States	3:21.6	Q
4	Hedwig Bienenfeld	Austria	Unknown	
5	Dora Gibbs	Great Britain	Unknown	
6	Virginie Rausch	Luxembourg	Unknown	

==== Heat 3 ====
Rank	Swimmer	Nation	Time	Notes
1	Else Jacobsen	Denmark	3:17.6	Q
2	Elfriede Zimmermann	Germany	3:18.6	Q
3	Marianne Gustafsson	Sweden	3:27.0	Q
4	Dorothy Prior	Canada	Unknown	
5	Mabel Hamblen	Great Britain	Unknown	

==== Heat 4 ====
Rank	Swimmer	Nation	Time	Notes
1	Margaretha van Norden	Netherlands	3:27.2	Q
2	Jane Fauntz	United States	3:29.0	Q
3	Doris Thompson	Australia	3:33.6	Q
4	Alice Stoffel	France	Unknown	

=== Semifinals ===
Wednesday 8 August 1928: The fastest three in each semi-final advanced.

==== Semifinal 1 ====
Rank	Swimmer	Nation	Time	Notes
1	Mietje Baron	Netherlands	3:15.4	Q
2	Charlotte Mühe	Germany	3:16.8	Q
2	Else Jacobsen	Denmark	3:16.8	Q
4	Agnes Geraghty	United States	Unknown	
5	Elfriede Zimmermann	Germany	Unknown	
6	Marianne Gustafsson	Sweden	Unknown	

==== Semifinal 2 ====
Rank	Swimmer	Nation	Time	Notes
1	Hilde Schrader	Germany	3:11.2	Q, =WR
2	Brita Hazelius	Sweden	3:21.4	Q
3	Margaret Hoffman	United States	3:22.4	Q
4	Margaretha van Norden	Netherlands	Unknown	
5	Doris Thompson	Australia	Unknown	
6	Jane Fauntz	United States	Unknown	

=== Final ===
Thursday 9 August 1928:

Rank	Swimmer	Nation	Time
1st place, gold medalist(s)	Hilde Schrader	Germany	3:12.6
2nd place, silver medalist(s)	Mietje Baron	Netherlands	3:15.2
3rd place, bronze medalist(s)	Charlotte Mühe	Germany	3:17.6
4	Else Jacobsen	Denmark	3:19.0
5	Margaret Hoffman	United States	3:19.2
6	Brita Hazelius	Sweden	3:23.0
