= Virginie Rausch =

Luxembourgish swimmer

Personal information
- Born: 12 October 1906 Luxembourg, Luxembourg
- Died: 9 February 1993 (aged 86) Luxembourg, Luxembourg

Sport
- Sport: Swimming

Virginie Rausch (12 October 1906 – 9 February 1993) was a Luxembourgish swimmer. She competed in the women's 200 metre breaststroke event at the 1928 Summer Olympics.
