= Jarrett Robertson =

U.S. Army general (1940–1993)

- Nickname: Desert Fox
- Born: September 3, 1940; Lincoln, Nebraska, U.S.
- Died: February 23, 1993 (aged 52) Wiesbaden, Hesse, Germany
- Cause of death: Helicopter crash
- Buried: Lutie Cemetery, Theodosia, Missouri, U.S. 36°34′59″N 92°40′18″W
- Allegiance: United States
- Branch: Army
- Service years: 1963–1993
- Rank: Major general
- Awards: § Awards and decorations
- Alma mater: Southwest Missouri State University; University of Missouri
- Spouses: Diana Pecka (m. 1963, divorced); Debra Whitman (m. 1988)
- Children: 5

Jarrett Jackson Robertson (September 3, 1940 – February 23, 1993) was a major general in the United States Army. He served two tours in the Vietnam War and earned several awards, including a Silver Star. Robertson served as the deputy commanding general of the 1st Armored Division and later of V Corps. He died in the crash of a Black Hawk helicopter near Wiesbaden, Germany, and has been memorialized across the United States through the dedications of structures that include a rappelling tower and a house.

== Personal life and education ==
Robertson was born on September 3, 1940, in Lincoln, Nebraska, and raised in Springfield, Missouri. Robertson's parents, Lonnie and Thelma Robertson, were notable radio entertainers in the Ozarks.

After graduating from Gainesville High School in 1958, Robertson attended Southwest Missouri State University (SMSU), joining their theatre program and later completing his two years of mandatory ROTC involvement. He was also a member of the Tau Kappa Epsilon fraternity. Robertson graduated from SMSU in 1963. The same year, he married Diana Pecka; they later had five daughters.

In 1971, Robertson graduated from University of Missouri with a Master of Science degree in history.

Robertson's father, Lonnie, died on February 19, 1981, after a four-month illness. In 1988, Robertson married Debra Whitman.

== Military career ==
Robertson began his service in the Regular Army on July 8, 1963, commissioned through ROTC. He joined because of the advice of a sergeant who spoke to him after his two years of ROTC, saying "You're going to face the draft anyway, so if you have to be in the Army you might as well be an officer."

His first assignment was at Fort Carson, Colorado. In 1965, Robertson was assigned to Vietnam, where he was an advisor to the Army of the Republic of Vietnam. In 1966, Robertson received a year of officer training at Fort Benning, Georgia. During that year, he was promoted to the rank of first lieutenant on July 8, 1966, and to the rank of captain on August 17, 1966. He then returned for a second tour in Vietnam. On November 9, 1968, Robertson took command of Troop B, 1st Squadron, 11th Armored Cavalry Regiment, when its commander, John Hays, was killed in action. His leadership of these 400 soldiers earned him a Silver Star Medal.

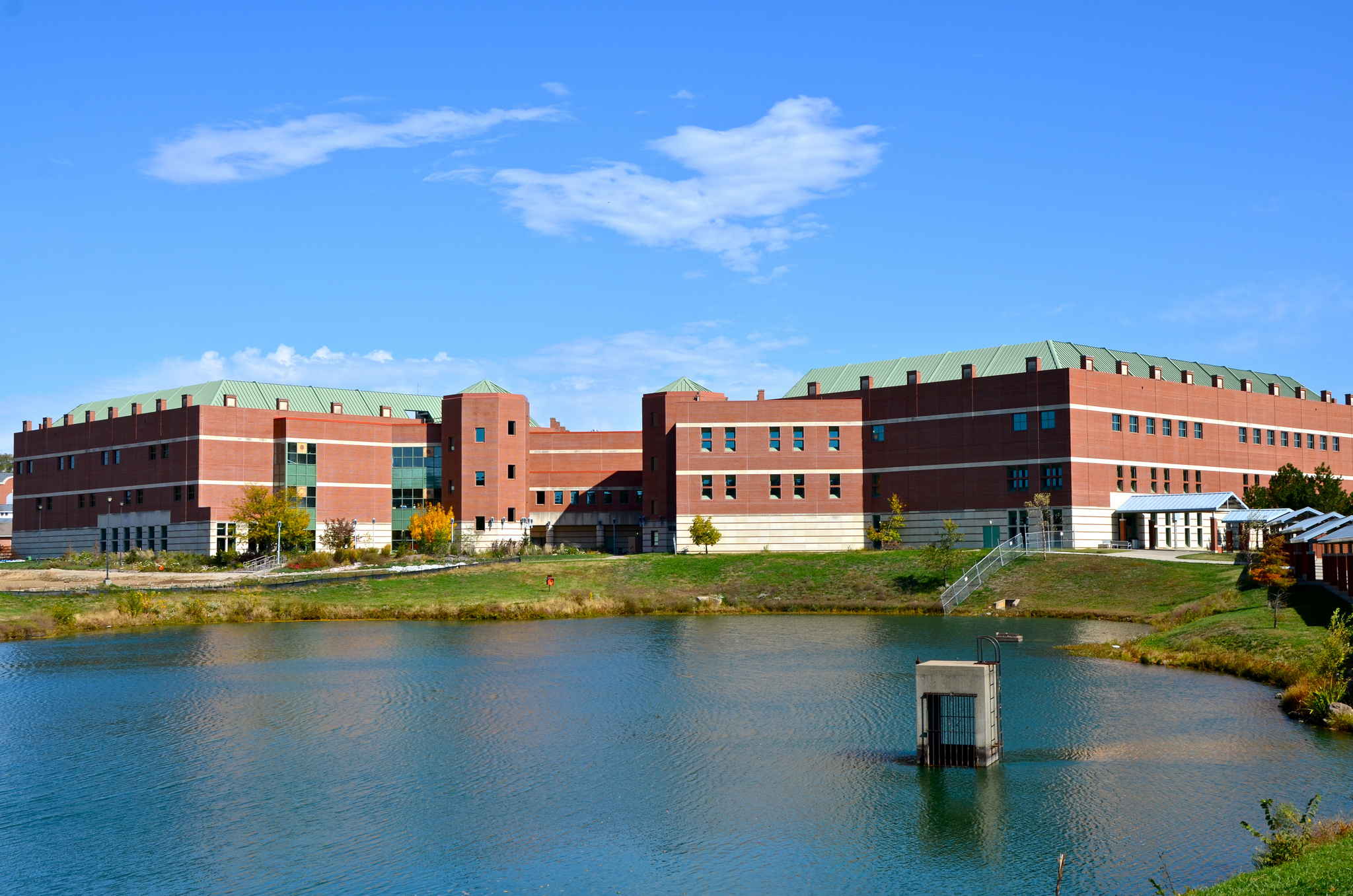
Eisenhower Hall, home to the Combined Arms Research Library, where Robertson would have studied during his time at CGSC.

After this tour in Vietnam, Robertson attended the United States Army Command and General Staff College (CGSC) at Fort Leavenworth, Kansas. By 1974, Robertson was a major serving at Fort Leavenworth. From 1980 to 1982, he commanded the 2nd Squadron, 3rd Armored Cavalry Regiment, at Fort Bliss, Texas. Sometime later, he commanded the opposing force at the Fort Irwin National Training Center (NTC), a unit trained in Soviet military tactics to test other units' tactical abilities.

From July 2, 1987, until 1989, Robertson commanded the 3rd Armored Cavalry Regiment as its 62nd colonel. During this time, he led the unit in its 14-day visit to the Fort Irwin NTC. When he left Fort Bliss, about 5,000 soldiers attended the ceremony, where post commander Donald Infante gave him the nickname "Desert Fox," comparing his skills to those of German field marshal Erwin Rommel, who held the same nickname.

Robertson was then assigned to Schweinfurt, Germany, where he served as the assistant commander of the 3rd Infantry Division. At some point, he was promoted to the rank of brigadier general, and later to the rank of major general.

From November 1990 to May 1991, he served as the deputy commanding general of the 1st Armored Division during the Gulf War. In June 1991, General Frederick M. Franks Jr. selected Robertson to serve as the chief of staff of the VII Corps. In 1993, Robertson was appointed the deputy commanding general of V Corps, a position he held until his death the same year.

== Awards and decorations ==
Robertson received the following awards for his military service:

	Combat Infantry Badge		
1st Row Awards	Silver Star Medal with one bronze oak leaf cluster (Note: Some sources say Robertson received two Silver Star awards (i.e. one bronze oak leaf cluster), while other sources only describe him receiving one Silver Star.)	Legion of Merit with three bronze oak leaf clusters	Bronze Star Medal with two bronze oak leaf clusters
2nd Row Awards	Meritorious Service Medal	Air Medal	Army Commendation Medal
3rd Row Awards	Army Achievement Medal	National Defense Service Medal with one bronze star	Vietnam Service Medal with one silver and two bronze service stars
4th Row Awards	Southwest Asia Service Medal	Army Service Ribbon	South Vietnamese Campaign Medal

== Death ==
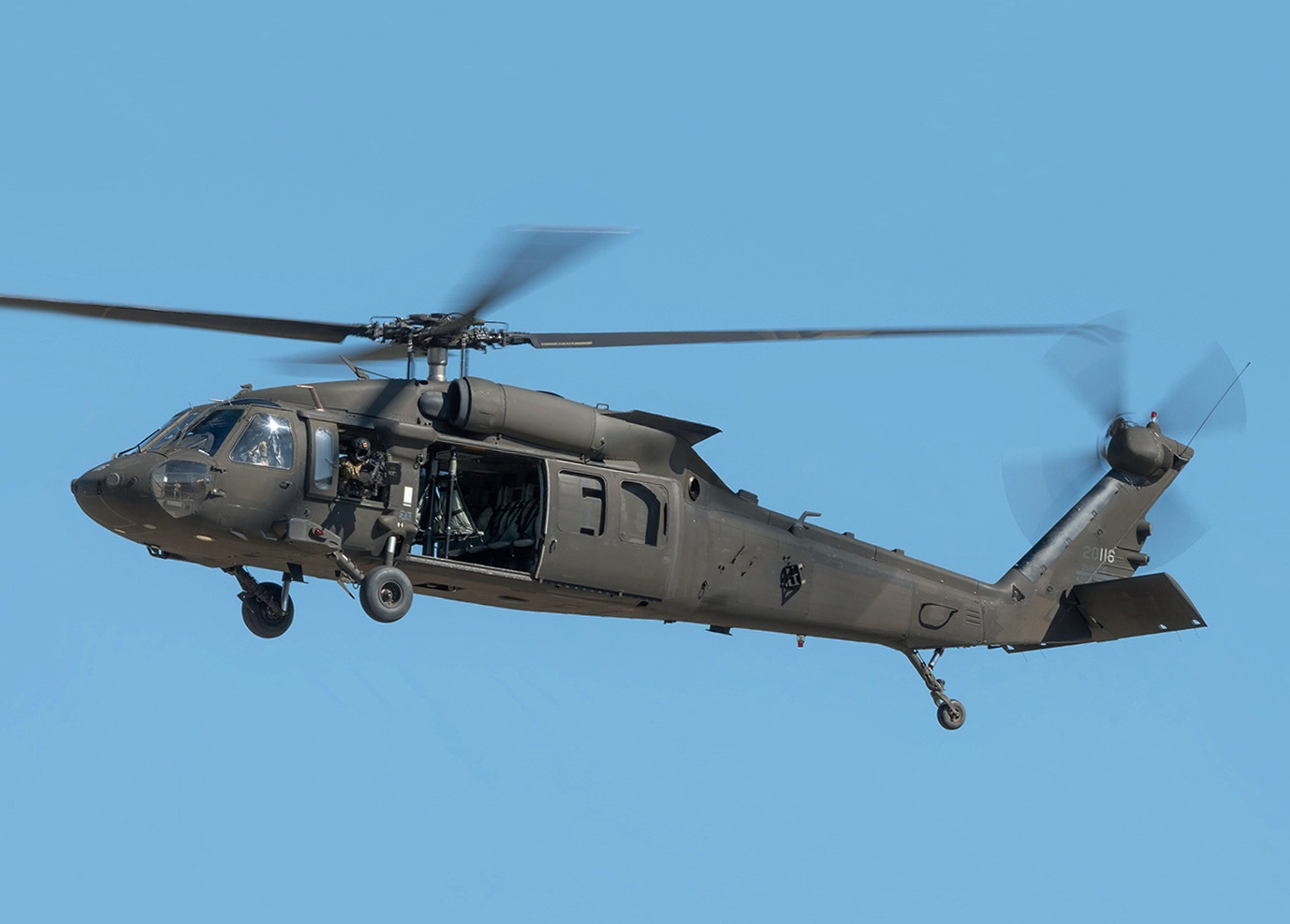
A Black Hawk helicopter operated by the U.S. Army

Robertson died at the age of 52 on February 23, 1993, at around 7:35 p.m. in the crash of a Sikorsky UH-60 Black Hawk helicopter near Wiesbaden, Germany. Returning from a meeting at the United States European Command headquarters in Stuttgart, the helicopter crashed while attempting to land at Wiesbaden Air Base. It hit a concrete apron near the air base's control tower and burst into flames. Four service members, including Robertson, died in the crash, and four others were hospitalized with burns.

Robertson was honored with a funeral at Fort Leavenworth National Cemetery. He was buried at Lutie Cemetery in Theodosia, Missouri.

=== Investigation ===
United Technologies Corporation (UTC)'s subsidiary Sikorsky Aircraft created a fuel system that held two 230-US-gallon (870 L; 190 imp gal) tanks on the helicopter's sides. After an investigation by V Corps concluded on June 8, the crash was believed to have occurred because of a failed fuel control valve, causing the helicopter to use fuel from only the left tank, leaving the right tank nearly full and the helicopter imbalanced.

The investigation found other factors that may have influenced the shift in balance to the right side of the aircraft. Prior to the flight, military police in Stuttgart left the Black Hawk unattended for some time, allowing two German boys to steal a cold weather emergency kit from the helicopter. This led to a delay on the ground, causing the auxiliary power unit, which only uses the left fuel tank, to run longer and use approximately 335 pounds (152 kg) of fuel from the left tank. Additionally, most of the passengers were seated on the right side of the aircraft, further contributing to its imbalance.

The investigation concluded that both pilots aboard the helicopter acted appropriately given their circumstances and that neither were under the influence of alcohol or drugs before the flight.

=== Lawsuit ===
In 2002, the pilot and other surviving service members from the crash, along with the deceased officers' widows, filed a negligence and product liability lawsuit against UTC. After 11 days of trial, the jury sided against UTC and awarded $22.9 million (approximately $41 million in 2025) in damages.

== Legacy ==
Robertson has been described as having an infectious confidence and strong leadership skills. Major General Donald R. Infante particularly praised him for his practical after-action reviews (AARs), saying Robertson gave "the best AAR [he'd] ever witnessed" and focusing on the positive learning environment Robertson created.

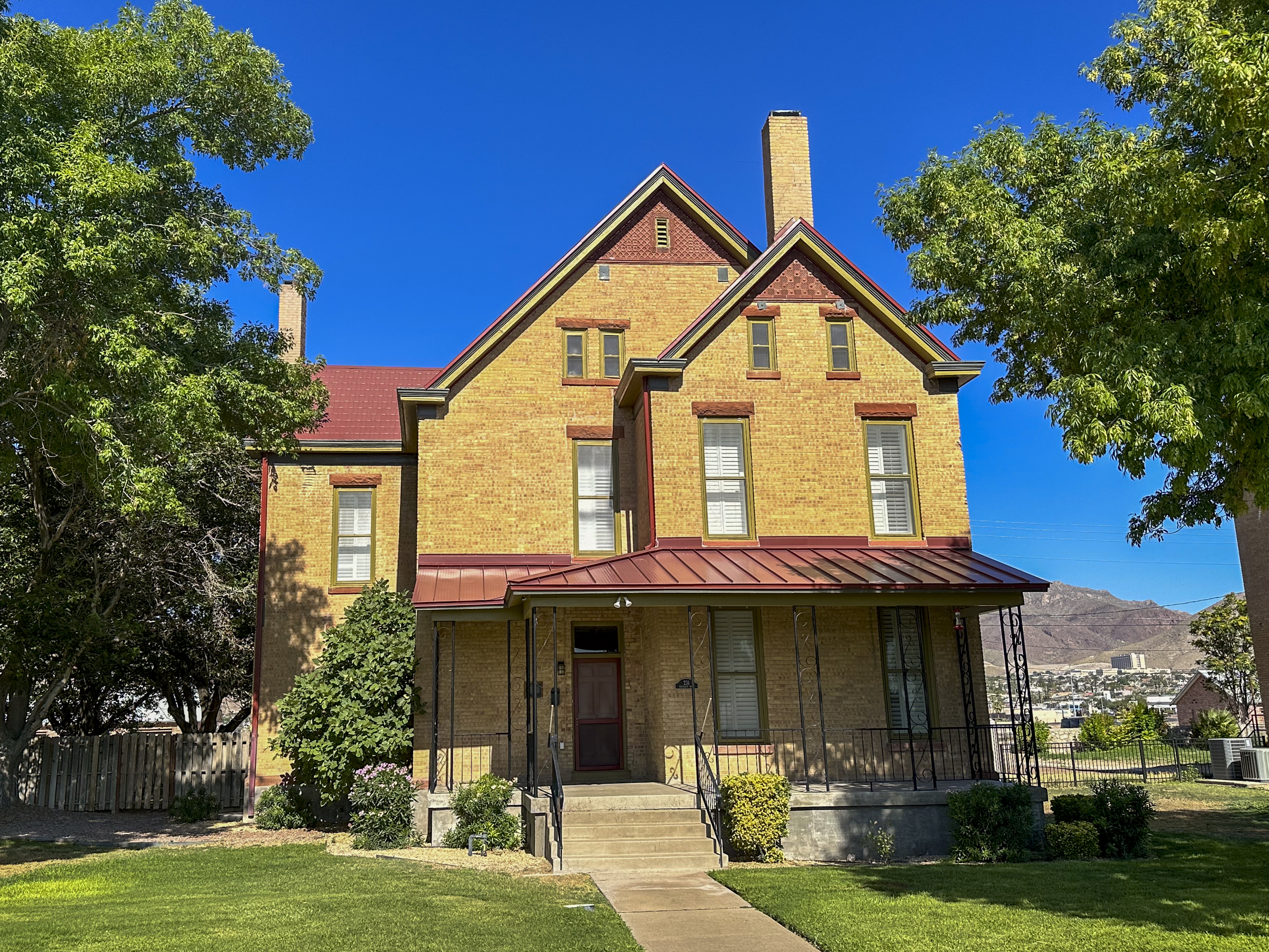
The Robertson House on Fort Bliss, Texas, in 2024

The 3rd Armored Cavalry Regiment dedicated a remodeled conference room to Robertson in July 1994. In August 1994, Southwest Missouri State University dedicated a new 43-foot-1 1/2-inch (13.145 m) rappelling tower for their ROTC program to Robertson. On October 13, 1995, the house at 231 Sheridan Rd on Fort Bliss, Texas, was dedicated to Robertson and named the Robertson House.
