= Hilde Schrader =

German swimmer

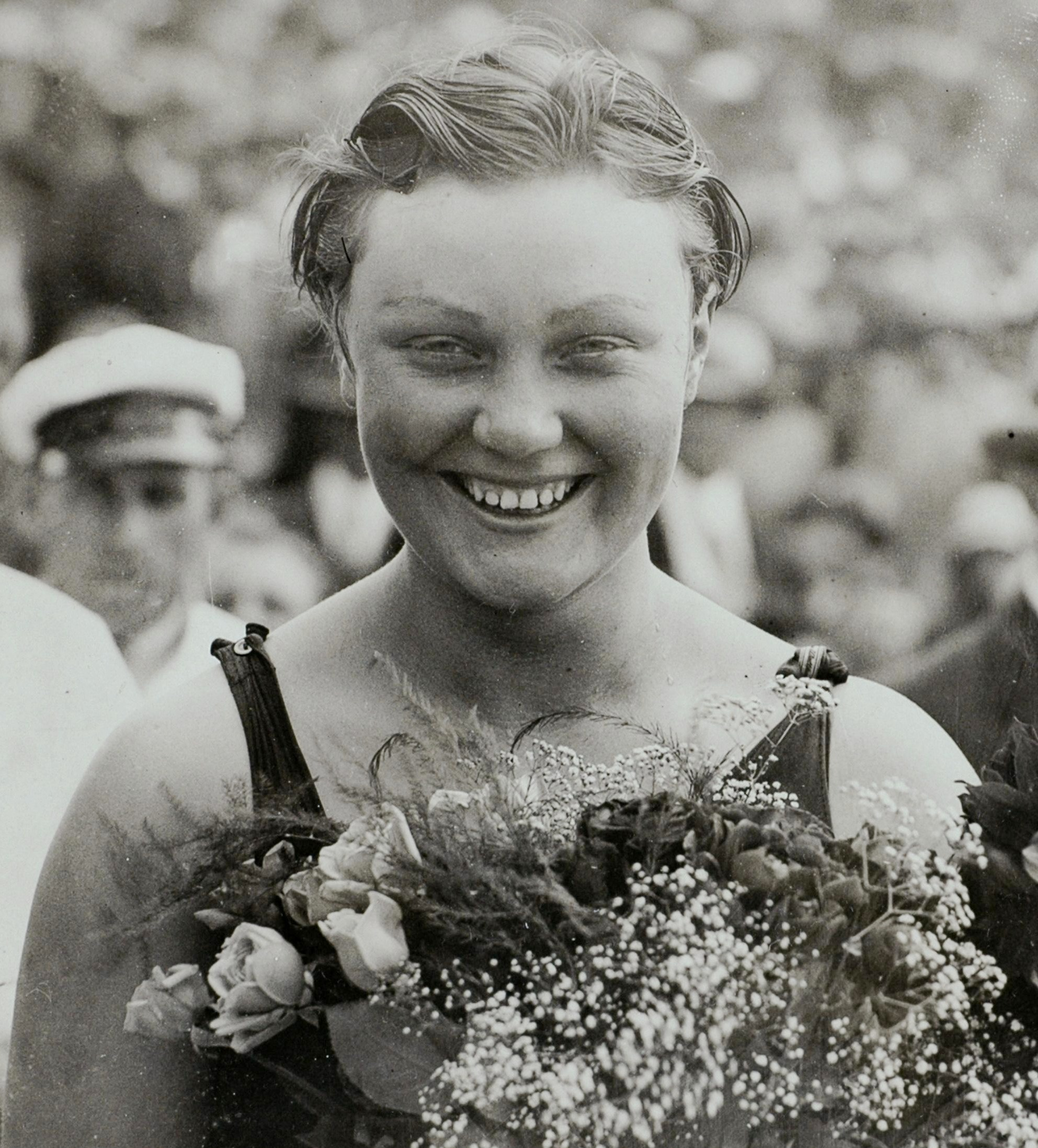
- Hilde Schrader at the 1928 Olympics

Personal information
- Born: 4 January 1910 Staßfurt, German Empire
- Died: 23 March 1966 (aged 56) Magdeburg, East Germany

Sport
- Sport: Swimming
- Club: 1. Magdeburger Damenschwimmverein
Medal record
Representing Germany
Olympic Games
Gold medal – first place	1928 Amsterdam	200 m breaststroke
European Championships
Gold medal – first place	1927 Bologna	200 m breaststroke

Hildegard "Hilde" Schrader (4 January 1910 – 23 March 1966) was a German swimmer who won the 200 m breaststroke event at the 1928 Summer Olympics and 1927 European Championships. She also set two world records in the obsolete breaststroke events, one in the 400 m (1928) and one in the 200 yd (1929). In 1994 she was inducted into the International Swimming Hall of Fame.

== See also ==
- List of members of the International Swimming Hall of Fame
