= List of Swedish Swimming Championships champions (men) =

This is a list of men's champions of the Swedish Swimming Championships, the annual swimming championship in long course, usually held outdoors in the Swedish summer. Records go back to 1899 in freestyle, backstroke, breaststroke, butterfly, and various relays and medley competitions.

== Current program ==
=== 50 metre freestyle ===
- 1983 – Per Holmertz (Stockholmspolisens IF)
- 1984 – Bengt Baron (SK Korrugal)
- 1985 – Per Johansson (Borlänge SS)
- 1986 – Per Johansson (Borlänge SS)
- 1987 – Göran Titus (Örebro Simallians)
- 1988 – Göran Titus (Örebro Simallians)
- 1989 – Göran Titus (Örebro Simallians)
- 1990 – Lars-Ove Jansson (Upsala S)
- 1991 – Pär Lindström (Katrineholms SS)
- 1992 – Pär Lindström (Katrineholms SS)
- 1993 – Pär Lindström (Katrineholms SS)
- 1994 – Lars-Ove Jansson (Upsala S)
- 1995 – Fredrik Letzler (Spårvägens SF)
- 1996 – Pär Lindström (Upsala S)
- 1997 – Lars Frölander (Sundsvalls SS)
- 1998 – Lars Frölander (Sundsvalls SS)
- 1999 – John Miranda (Södertälje SS)
- 2000 – John Miranda (Södertälje SS)
- 2001 – Stefan Nystrand (Södertörns SS)
- 2002 – Stefan Nystrand (Södertörns SS)
- 2003 – Stefan Nystrand (Södertörns SS)
- 2004 – Stefan Nystrand (Södertörns SS)
- 2005 – Marcus Piehl (Linköpings ASS)
- 2006 – Stefan Nystrand (SK Neptun)
- 2007 – Stefan Nystrand (SK Neptun)
- 2008 – Mathias Hageneier (SK Laxen)
- 2009 – Stefan Nystrand (SK Neptun)
- 2010 – Stefan Nystrand (SK Neptun)
- 2011 – Petter Stymne (SK Neptun)
- 2012 – Stefan Nystrand (Spårvägens SF)
- 2013 – Petter Stymne (SK Neptun)
- 2014 – Christoffer Carlsen (Mölndals ASS)
- 2015 – Christoffer Carlsen (Mölndals ASS)
- 2016 – Christoffer Carlsen (Helsingborgs S)
- 2017 – Christoffer Carlsen (Helsingborgs S)
- 2018 – Melker Selin (SK Elfsborg)
- 2019 – Jonathan Kling (Örebro Simallians)
- 2021 – Olle Sköld (SK Neptun)
- 2022 – Isak Eliasson (Spårvägens SF)

=== 100 metre freestyle ===
- 1899 – Per Björkman (Upsala S)
- 1900 – Per Björkman (Upsala S)
- 1901 – Erik Eriksson (Stockholms KK)
- 1902 – Hjalmar Johansson (Stockholms KK)
- 1903 – Gunnar Wennerström (Stockholms KK)
- 1904 – Gunnar Wennerström (Stockholms KK)
- 1905 – Wilhelm Persson (Stockholms KK)
- 1906 – Robert Andersson (Stockholms KK)
- 1907 – Harald Julin (Stockholms KK)
- 1908 – Harald Julin (Stockholms KK)
- 1909 – Harald Julin (Stockholms KK)
- 1910 – Robert Andersson (Stockholms KK)
- 1911 – Harald Julin (Stockholms KK)
- 1912 – Robert Andersson (Stockholms KK)
- 1913 – Harald Julin (Stockholms KK)
- 1914 – Robert Andersson (Stockholms KK)
- 1915 – Kaj Hansen (Malmö S)
- 1916 – Kaj Hansen (Malmö S)
- 1917 – Ture Ågren (Malmö S)
- 1918 – Ture Ågren (Malmö S)
- 1919 – Ture Ågren (Malmö S)
- 1920 – Orvar Trolle (Malmö S)
- 1921 – Orvar Trolle (Malmö S)
- 1922 – Orvar Trolle (Malmö S)
- 1923 – Arne Borg (Stockholms KK)
- 1924 – Arne Borg (Stockholms KK)
- 1925 – Arne Borg (Stockholms KK)
- 1926 – Georg Werner (SoIK Hellas)
- 1927 – Arne Borg (Stockholms KK)
- 1928 – Arne Borg (Stockholms KK)
- 1929 – Arne Borg (Stockholms KK)
- 1930 – Ewert Jernström (SoIK Hellas)
- 1931 – Sven-Pelle Pettersson (SK Neptun)
- 1932 – Sven-Pelle Pettersson (SK Neptun)
- 1933 – Sven-Pelle Pettersson (SK Neptun)
- 1934 – Sven-Pelle Pettersson (SK Neptun)
- 1935 – Sven-Pelle Pettersson (SK Neptun)
- 1936 – Sven-Pelle Pettersson (SK Neptun)
- 1937 – Per-Olof Olsson (SoIK Hellas)
- 1938 – Björn Borg (Norrköpings KK)
- 1939 – Per-Olof Olsson (SoIK Hellas)
- 1940 – Björn Borg (Norrköpings KK)
- 1941 – Per-Olof Olsson (SoIK Hellas)
- 1942 – Per-Olof Olsson (SoIK Hellas)
- 1943 – Per-Olof Olsson (SoIK Hellas)
- 1944 – Per-Olof Olsson (SoIK Hellas)
- 1945 – Per-Olof Olsson (SoIK Hellas)
- 1946 – Per-Olof Olsson (SoIK Hellas)
- 1947 – Per-Olof Olsson (SoIK Hellas)
- 1948 – Per-Olof Olsson (SoIK Hellas)
- 1949 – Per-Olof Olsson (SoIK Hellas)
- 1950 – Göran Larsson (Stockholms KK)
- 1951 – Göran Larsson (Stockholms KK)
- 1952 – Göran Larsson (Stockholms KK)
- 1953 – Göran Larsson (Stockholms KK)
- 1954 – Göran Larsson (Stockholms KK)
- 1955 – Hans Lindström (SK Neptun)
- 1956 – Håkan Westesson (SK Poseidon)
- 1957 – Göran Larsson (Simavdelningen 1902)
- 1958 – Per-Ola Lindberg (SK Neptun)
- 1959 – Per-Ola Lindberg (SK Neptun)
- 1960 – Per-Ola Lindberg (SK Neptun)
- 1961 – Per-Ola Lindberg (SK Neptun)
- 1962 – Per-Ola Lindberg (SK Neptun)
- 1963 – Per-Ola Lindberg (SK Neptun)
- 1964 – Per-Ola Lindberg (SK Neptun)
- 1965 – Lester Eriksson (SK Neptun)
- 1966 – Lester Eriksson (SK Neptun)
- 1967 – Göran Jansson (Filipstads SS)
- 1968 – Lester Eriksson (SK Neptun)
- 1969 – Gunnar Larsson (Malmö S)
- 1970 – Gunnar Larsson (Malmö S)
- 1971 – Göran Jansson (Stockholmspolisens IF)
- 1972 – Bengt Gingsjö (Simavdelningen 1902)
- 1973 – Bernt Zarnowiecki (Falu SS)
- 1974 – Bernt Zarnowiecki (Falu SS)
- 1975 – Bernt Zarnowiecki (Falu SS)
- 1976 – Svante Rasmusson (Umeå SS)
- 1977 – Dan Larsson (Sundsvalls SS)
- 1978 – Per-Alvar Magnusson (Upsala S)
- 1979 – Per Wikström (Borlänge SS)
- 1980 – Per Holmertz (Stockholmspolisens IF)
- 1981 – Per Johansson (Borlänge SS)
- 1982 – Per Johansson (Borlänge SS)
- 1983 – Per Holmertz (Stockholmspolisens IF)
- 1984 – Thomas Lejdström (Västerås SS)
- 1985 – Tommy Werner (Karlskrona SS)
- 1986 – Per Johansson (Borlänge SS)
- 1987 – Tommy Werner (Karlskrona SS)
- 1988 – Tommy Werner (Karlskrona SS)
- 1989 – Tommy Werner (Karlskrona SS)
- 1990 – Tommy Werner (Karlskrona SS)
- 1991 – Anders Holmertz (Spårvägens SF)
- 1992 – Tommy Werner (Karlskrona SS)
- 1993 – Anders Holmertz (Spårvägens SF)
- 1994 – Anders Holmertz (Spårvägens SF)
- 1995 – Fredrik Letzler (Spårvägens SF)
- 1996 – Anders Holmertz (Spårvägens SF)
- 1997 – Lars Frölander (Sundsvalls SS)
- 1998 – Lars Frölander (Sundsvalls SS)
- 1999 – John Miranda (Södertälje SS)
- 2000 – Lars Frölander (Sundsvalls SS)
- 2001 – Lars Frölander (Sundsvalls SS)
- 2002 – Lars Frölander (Linköpings ASS)
- 2003 – Lars Frölander (Linköpings ASS)
- 2004 – Eric la Fleur (Malmö KK)
- 2005 – Jonas Persson (Malmö KK)
- 2006 – Lars Frölander (Linköpings ASS)
- 2007 – Petter Stymne (SK Neptun)
- 2008 – Christoffer Vikström (Upsala S)
- 2009 – Stefan Nystrand (SK Neptun)
- 2010 – Jonas Persson (Malmö KK)
- 2011 – Lars Frölander (Linköpings ASS)
- 2012 – David Larsson (Uddevalla Sim)
- 2013 – Oscar Ekström (Linköpings ASS)
- 2014 – Christoffer Carlsen (Mölndals ASS)
- 2015 – Oscar Ekström (Linköpings ASS)
- 2016 – Christoffer Carlsen (Helsingborgs S)
- 2017 – Christoffer Carlsen (Helsingborgs S) and Isak Eliasson (Helsingborgs S)
- 2018 – Christoffer Carlsen (Helsingborgs S)
- 2019 – Christoffer Carlsen (Helsingborgs S)
- 2021 – Robin Hanson (Spårvägens SF)
- 2022 – Björn Seeliger (Stockholms KK)

=== 200 metre freestyle ===
- 1915 – Robert Andersson (Stockholms KK)
- 1916 – Robert Andersson (Stockholms KK)
- 1917 – Robert Andersson (Stockholms KK)
- 1918 – Robert Andersson (Stockholms KK)
- 1919 – Robert Andersson (Stockholms KK)
- 1920 – Arne Borg (Stockholms KK)
- 1921 – Arne Borg (Stockholms KK)
- 1922 – Arne Borg (Stockholms KK)
- 1923 – Arne Borg (Stockholms KK)
- 1924 – Åke Borg (Stockholms KK)
- 1925 – Arne Borg (Stockholms KK)
- 1926 – Eskil Lundahl (Malmö S)
- 1927 – Arne Borg (Stockholms KK)
- 1928 – Arne Borg (Stockholms KK)
- 1929 – Arne Borg (Stockholms KK)
- 1930 – Sven-Pelle Pettersson (SK Neptun)
- 1931 – Sven-Pelle Pettersson (SK Neptun)
- 1932 – William Grut (SK Neptun)
- 1933 – Georg Werner (Stockholms KK)
- 1934 – Sven-Pelle Pettersson (SK Neptun)
- 1935 – Sven-Pelle Pettersson (SK Neptun)
- 1936 – Björn Borg (Norrköpings KK)
- 1937 – Björn Borg (Norrköpings KK)
- 1938 – Björn Borg (Norrköpings KK)
- 1939 – Åke Julin (Stockholms KK)
- 1940 – Björn Borg (Norrköpings KK)
- 1941 – Björn Borg (Norrköpings KK)
- 1942 – Bernt Lilja (Nyköpings SS)
- 1943 – Rune Gustavsson (SoIK Hellas)
- 1944 – Martin Lundén (SK Neptun)
- 1945 – Martin Lundén (SK Neptun)
- 1946 – Hans Johansson (Norrköpings KK)
- 1947 – Olle Johansson (IF Elfsborg)
- 1948 – Per-Olof Östrand (Hofors AIF)
- 1949 – Per-Olof Östrand (Hofors AIF)
- 1950 – Göran Larsson (Stockholms KK)
- 1951 – Per-Olof Östrand (IF Elfsborg)
- 1952 – Per-Olof Östrand (IF Elfsborg)
- 1953 – Per-Olof Östrand (IF Elfsborg)
- 1954 – Per-Olof Östrand (IF Elfsborg)
- 1955 – Hans Lindström (SK Neptun)
- 1956 – Håkan Westesson (SK Poseidon)
- 1957 – Kristian König (SK Neptun)
- 1958 – Willy Hemlin (Simavdelningen 1902)
- 1959 – Bengt Nordvall (SK Neptun)
- 1960 – Per-Ola Lindberg (SK Neptun)
- 1961 – Per-Ola Lindberg (SK Neptun)
- 1962 – Per-Ola Lindberg (SK Neptun)
- 1963 – Jan Lundin (Stockholmspolisens IF)
- 1964 – Mats Svensson (IF Elfsborg)
- 1965 – Lester Eriksson (SK Neptun)
- 1966 – Ingvar Eriksson (Sundsvalls SS)
- 1967 – Lester Eriksson (SK Neptun)
- 1968 – Lester Eriksson (SK Neptun)
- 1969 – Gunnar Larsson (Malmö S)
- 1970 – Gunnar Larsson (Malmö S)
- 1971 – Gunnar Larsson (Malmö S)
- 1972 – Bengt Gingsjö (Simavdelningen 1902)
- 1973 – Bernt Zarnowiecki (Falu SS)
- 1974 – Bengt Gingsjö (Simavdelningen 1902)
- 1975 – Bengt Gingsjö (Simavdelningen 1902)
- 1976 – Peter Pettersson (SK Laxen)
- 1977 – Per Holmertz (Motala SS)
- 1978 – Per Holmertz (Motala SS)
- 1979 – Per Wikström (Borlänge SS)
- 1980 – Michael Söderlund (Karlskrona SS)
- 1981 – Michael Söderlund (Karlskrona SS)
- 1982 – Thomas Lejdström (Västerås SS)
- 1983 – Michael Söderlund (Karlskrona SS)
- 1984 – Anders Holmertz (Motala SS)
- 1985 – Anders Holmertz (Motala SS)
- 1986 – Anders Holmertz (Motala SS)
- 1987 – Tommy Werner (Karlskrona SS)
- 1988 – Anders Holmertz (Motala SS)
- 1989 – Anders Holmertz (Motala SS)
- 1990 – Anders Holmertz (Motala SS)
- 1991 – Anders Holmertz (Spårvägens SF)
- 1992 – Anders Holmertz (Spårvägens SF)
- 1993 – Anders Holmertz (Spårvägens SF)
- 1994 – Anders Holmertz (Spårvägens SF)
- 1995 – Anders Holmertz (Spårvägens SF)
- 1996 – Anders Holmertz (Spårvägens SF)
- 1997 – Anders Lyrbring (Kungälvs SS)
- 1998 – Anders Lyrbring (Kungälvs SS)
- 1999 – Anders Lyrbring (Mölndals ASS)
- 2000 – Max von Bodungen (Malmö KK)
- 2001 – Anders Lyrbring (Mölndals ASS)
- 2002 – Jonas Persson (Malmö KK)
- 2003 – Jonas Persson (Malmö KK)
- 2004 – Jonas Persson (Malmö KK)
- 2005 – Jonas Persson (Malmö KK)
- 2006 – Jonas Persson (Malmö KK)
- 2007 – Christoffer Vikström (Upsala S)
- 2008 – Christoffer Vikström (Upsala S)
- 2009 – Mattias Carlsson (Uddevalla Sim)
- 2010 – Robin Andréasson (Mölndals ASS)
- 2011 – Robin Andréasson (Mölndals ASS)
- 2012 – Jesper Jonsson (Växjö SS)
- 2013 – Mattias Carlsson (Uddevalla Sim)
- 2014 – Oscar Ekström (Linköpings ASS)
- 2015 – Oscar Ekström (Linköpings ASS)
- 2016 – Adam Paulsson (SK Elfsborg)
- 2017 – Adam Paulsson (SK Elfsborg)
- 2018 – Nils Liess (Kungsbacka SS)
- 2019 – Gustaf Dahlman (Västerås SS)
- 2021 – Victor Johansson (Jönköpings SS)
- 2022 – Robin Hanson (Spårvägens SF)

=== 400 metre freestyle ===
- 1930 – Georg Svensson (SoIK Hellas)
- 1931 – Georg Svensson (SoIK Hellas)
- 1932 – William Grut (SK Neptun)
- 1933 – Georg Svensson (SoIK Hellas)
- 1934 – Sten-Olof Bolldén (Stockholms KK)
- 1935 – William Grut (SK Neptun)
- 1936 – Björn Borg (Norrköpings KK)
- 1937 – Björn Borg (Norrköpings KK)
- 1938 – Björn Borg (Norrköpings KK)
- 1939 – Åke Julin (Stockholms KK)
- 1940 – Björn Borg (Norrköpings KK)
- 1941 – Björn Borg (Norrköpings KK)
- 1942 – Bernt Lilja (Nyköpings SS)
- 1943 – Gunnar Hellström (Norrköpings KK)
- 1944 – Björn Borg (Norrköpings KK)
- 1945 – Olle Johansson (IF Elfsborg)
- 1946 – Rune Gustavsson (SoIK Hellas)
- 1947 – Per-Olof Östrand (Hofors AIF)
- 1948 – Per-Olof Östrand (Hofors AIF)
- 1949 – Per-Olof Östrand (Hofors AIF)
- 1950 – Per-Olof Östrand (Hofors AIF)
- 1951 – Per-Olof Östrand (Hofors AIF)
- 1952 – Per-Olof Östrand (Hofors AIF)
- 1953 – Per-Olof Östrand (Hofors AIF)
- 1954 – Per-Olof Östrand (Hofors AIF)
- 1955 – Per-Olof Östrand (Hofors AIF)
- 1956 – Willy Hemlin (Simavdelningen 1902)
- 1957 – Lars Eriksson (SoIK Hellas)
- 1958 – Willy Hemlin (Simavdelningen 1902)
- 1959 – Lars-Erik Bengtsson (SK Neptun)
- 1960 – Lars-Erik Bengtsson (SK Neptun)
- 1961 – Sten Ekman (Tunafors SK)
- 1962 – Hans Rosendahl (Katrineholms SS)
- 1963 – Jan Lundin (Stockholmspolisens IF)
- 1964 – Hans Rosendahl (Katrineholms SS)
- 1965 – Lester Eriksson (SK Neptun)
- 1966 – Jan Lundin (Stockholmspolisens IF)
- 1967 – Sven von Holst (Stockholms KK)
- 1968 – Gunnar Larsson (Malmö S)
- 1969 – Gunnar Larsson (Malmö S)
- 1970 – Gunnar Larsson (Malmö S)
- 1971 – Gunnar Larsson (Malmö S)
- 1972 – Gunnar Larsson (Malmö S)
- 1973 – Anders Bellbring (Limhamns SS)
- 1974 – Peter Pettersson (SK Laxen)
- 1975 – Bengt Gingsjö (Simavdelningen 1902)
- 1976 – Peter Pettersson (SK Laxen)
- 1977 – Gary Andersson (Kristianstads SLS)
- 1978 – Gary Andersson (Kristianstads SLS)
- 1979 – Magnus Petersson (Jönköpings SS)
- 1980 – Thomas Lejdström (Västerås SS)
- 1981 – Thomas Lejdström (Västerås SS)
- 1982 – Thomas Lejdström (Västerås SS)
- 1983 – Thomas Lejdström (Västerås SS)
- 1984 – Anders Holmertz (Motala SS)
- 1985 – Anders Holmertz (Motala SS)
- 1986 – Anders Holmertz (Motala SS)
- 1987 – Anders Holmertz (Motala SS)
- 1988 – Anders Holmertz (Motala SS)
- 1989 – Anders Holmertz (Motala SS)
- 1990 – Anders Holmertz (Motala SS)
- 1991 – Anders Holmertz (Spårvägens SF)
- 1992 – Anders Holmertz (Spårvägens SF)
- 1993 – Anders Holmertz (Spårvägens SF)
- 1994 – Anders Holmertz (Spårvägens SF)
- 1995 – Anders Holmertz (Spårvägens SF)
- 1996 – Anders Holmertz (Spårvägens SF)
- 1997 – Jonas Lundström (Sundsvalls SS)
- 1998 – Petter Lindh (Jönköpings SS)
- 1999 – Mikael E. Rosén (Sundsvalls SS)
- 2000 – Patrik Svensson (Malmö KK)
- 2001 – Johan Claar (Jönköpings SS)
- 2002 – Michael Jacobsson (Täby Sim)
- 2003 – Peter Edvardsson (SK Neptun)
- 2004 – Peter Edvardsson (SK Neptun)
- 2005 – Peter Edvardsson (SK Neptun)
- 2006 – Pierre Roger (Väsby SS)
- 2007 – Christoffer Vikström (Upsala S)
- 2008 – Linus Junefelt (Jönköpings SS)
- 2009 – Gustav Åberg Lejdström (Helsingborgs S)
- 2010 – Mats Westergren (SK Ran)
- 2011 – Robin Andréasson (Mölndals ASS)
- 2012 – Kristian Kron (Helsingborgs S)
- 2013 – Gustav Åberg Lejdström (Helsingborgs S)
- 2014 – Gustav Åberg Lejdström (Helsingborgs S)
- 2015 – Victor Johansson (Jönköpings SS)
- 2016 – Adam Paulsson (SK Elfsborg)
- 2017 – Victor Johansson (Jönköpings SS)
- 2018 – Adam Paulsson (SK Elfsborg)
- 2019 – Wiggo Frohde (SK Neptun)
- 2021 – Victor Johansson (Jönköpings SS)
- 2022 – Victor Johansson (Jönköpings SS)

=== 800 metre freestyle ===
- 1983 – Karl-Erik Elias (Linköpings ASS)
- 1984 – Anders Holmertz (Motala SS)
- 1985 – Anders Holmertz (Motala SS)
- 2001 – Magnus Fredriksson (Norrköpings KK)
- 2002 – Michael Jacobsson (Täby Sim)
- 2003 – Fredrik Gustafsson (Malmö KK)
- 2004 – Johan Claar (Jönköpings SS)
- 2005 – Johan Claar (Jönköpings SS)
- 2006 – Johan Claar (Jönköpings SS)
- 2007 – Johan Claar (Jönköpings SS)
- 2008 – Linus Junefelt (Jönköpings SS)
- 2009 – Christoffer Wallin (Helsingborgs S)
- 2010 – Oskar Nordstrand (Helsingborgs S)
- 2011 – Gustav Åberg Lejdström (Helsingborgs S)
- 2012 – Gustav Åberg Lejdström (Helsingborgs S)
- 2013 – Oskar Nordstrand (Helsingborgs S)
- 2014 – Adam Paulsson (SK Elfsborg)
- 2015 – Victor Johansson (Jönköpings SS)
- 2016 – Adam Paulsson (SK Elfsborg)
- 2017 – Victor Johansson (Jönköpings SS)
- 2018 – Victor Johansson (Jönköpings SS)
- 2019 – Mattias Glenesk (SK Neptun)
- 2021 – Victor Johansson (Jönköpings SS)
- 2022 – Victor Johansson (Jönköpings SS)

=== 1500 metre freestyle ===
- 1915 – Vilhelm Andersson (SK Neptun)
- 1916 – Hedly Norell (Stockholms KK)
- 1917 – Gunnar Walldén (Örebro SS)
- 1918 – Vilhelm Andersson (SK Delfin)
- 1919 – Vilhelm Andersson (SK Delfin)
- 1920 – Arne Borg (Stockholms KK)
- 1921 – Arne Borg (Stockholms KK)
- 1922 – Arne Borg (Stockholms KK)
- 1923 – Arne Borg (Stockholms KK)
- 1924 – Åke Borg (Stockholms KK)
- 1925 – Åke Borg (Stockholms KK)
- 1926 – Hilding Björck (SK Neptun)
- 1927 – Arne Borg (Stockholms KK)
- 1928 – Arne Borg (Stockholms KK)
- 1929 – Curt Atterday (SoIK Hellas)
- 1930 – Georg Svensson (SoIK Hellas)
- 1931 – Georg Svensson (SoIK Hellas)
- 1932 – William Grut (SK Neptun)
- 1933 – Georg Svensson (SoIK Hellas)
- 1934 – Runar Juhlin (Eskilstuna SS) and Werner Sjögren (Eskilstuna SS)
- 1935 – William Grut (SK Neptun)
- 1936 – Gunnar Klingberg (Stockholms KK)
- 1937 – Björn Borg (Norrköpings KK)
- 1938 – Björn Borg (Norrköpings KK)
- 1939 – Björn Borg (Norrköpings KK)
- 1940 – Björn Borg (Norrköpings KK)
- 1941 – Björn Borg (Norrköpings KK)
- 1942 – Torsten Jansson (Upsala S)
- 1943 – Torsten Jansson (Upsala S)
- 1944 – Torsten Jansson (Upsala S)
- 1945 – Bror-Ebbe Andersson (IF Elfsborg)
- 1946 – Bror-Ebbe Andersson (IF Elfsborg)
- 1947 – Bror-Ebbe Andersson (IF Elfsborg)
- 1948 – Per-Olof Östrand (IF Elfsborg)
- 1949 – Per-Olof Östrand (IF Elfsborg)
- 1950 – Curt Abrahamsson (Stockholms KK)
- 1951 – Per-Olof Östrand (IF Elfsborg)
- 1952 – Per-Olof Östrand (IF Elfsborg)
- 1953 – Per-Olof Östrand (IF Elfsborg)
- 1954 – Per-Olof Östrand (IF Elfsborg)
- 1955 – Willy Hemlin (Norrköpings KK)
- 1956 – Willy Hemlin (Norrköpings KK)
- 1957 – Leif Wolmsten (SK Neptun)
- 1958 – Willy Hemlin (Simavdelningen 1902)
- 1959 – Lars-Erik Bengtsson (SK Neptun)
- 1960 – Lars-Erik Bengtsson (SK Neptun)
- 1961 – Sten Ekman (Tunafors SK)
- 1962 – Lars-Erik Bengtsson (SK Neptun)
- 1963 – Hans Rosendahl (Katrineholms SS)
- 1964 – Hans Rosendahl (Katrineholms SS)
- 1965 – Peter Feil (Eskilstuna SS)
- 1966 – Glen Bengtsson (Simavdelningen 1902)
- 1967 – Peter Feil (Eskilstuna SS)
- 1968 – Peter Feil (Eskilstuna SS)
- 1969 – Sven von Holst (Stockholms KK)
- 1970 – Gunnar Larsson (Malmö S)
- 1971 – Anders Bellbring (Upsala S)
- 1972 – Anders Bellbring (Upsala S)
- 1973 – Anders Bellbring (Upsala S)
- 1974 – Peter Pettersson (SK Laxen)
- 1975 – Peter Pettersson (SK Laxen)
- 1976 – Gary Andersson (Norrköpings KK)
- 1977 – Gary Andersson (Kristianstads SLS)
- 1978 – Stefan Andersson (Tunafors SK)
- 1979 – Magnus Petersson (Jönköpings SS)
- 1980 – Thomas Lejdström (Västerås SS)
- 1981 – Thomas Lejdström (Västerås SS)
- 1982 – Karl-Erik Elias (Linköpings ASS)
- 1983 – Karl-Erik Elias (Linköpings ASS)
- 1984 – Anders Holmertz (Motala SS)
- 1985 – Anders Holmertz (Motala SS)
- 1986 – Anders Holmertz (Motala SS)
- 1987 – Stefan Persson (Malmö KK)
- 1988 – Stefan Persson (Malmö KK)
- 1989 – Stefan Persson (Malmö KK)
- 1990 – Stefan Persson (Malmö KK)
- 1991 – Anders Holmertz (Spårvägens SF)
- 1992 – Ola Strömberg (Malmö KK)
- 1993 – Jonas Lundström (Södertälje SS)
- 1994 – Jonas Lundström (Södertälje SS)
- 1995 – Jonas Lundström (Södertälje SS)
- 1996 – Ola Strömberg (Upsala S)
- 1997 – Jonas Lundström (Sundsvalls SS)
- 1998 – Mikael E. Rosén (Sundsvalls SS)
- 1999 – Mikael E. Rosén (Sundsvalls SS)
- 2000 – Mathias Olshed (SK Sydsim)
- 2001 – Johan Claar (Jönköpings SS)
- 2002 – Hannes Kohnke (Malmö KK)
- 2003 – Johan Claar (Jönköpings SS)
- 2004 – Johan Claar (Jönköpings SS)
- 2005 – Johan Claar (Jönköpings SS)
- 2006 – Johan Claar (Jönköpings SS)
- 2007 – Johan Claar (Jönköpings SS)
- 2008 – Linus Junefelt (Jönköpings SS)
- 2009 – Jonas Grundström (Västerås SS)
- 2010 – Oscar Ekström (Linköpings ASS)
- 2011 – Gustav Åberg Lejdström (Helsingborgs S)
- 2012 – Gustav Åberg Lejdström (Helsingborgs S)
- 2013 – Oskar Nordstrand (Helsingborgs S)
- 2014 – Adam Paulsson (SK Elfsborg)
- 2015 – Christopher Jedel (Mölndals ASS)
- 2016 – Adam Paulsson (SK Elfsborg)
- 2017 – Victor Johansson (Jönköpings SS)
- 2018 – Victor Johansson (Jönköpings SS)
- 2019 – Christopher Jedel (Mölndals ASS)
- 2021 – Victor Johansson (Jönköpings SS)
- 2022 – Victor Johansson (Jönköpings SS)

=== 50 metre backstroke ===
- 1994 – Daniel Lönnberg (Karlskrona SS)
- 1995 – Daniel Lönnberg (Växjö SS)
- 1996 – Mattias Ohlin (Trelleborgs SS)
- 1998 – Daniel Carlsson (Väsby SS)
- 1999 – Mattias Ohlin (Trelleborgs SS)
- 2000 – Mattias Ohlin (Trelleborgs SS)
- 2001 – Eric la Fleur (Malmö KK)
- 2002 – Eric la Fleur (Malmö KK)
- 2003 – Eric la Fleur (Malmö KK)
- 2004 – Eric la Fleur (Malmö KK)
- 2005 – Pontus Renholm (Stockholmspolisens IF)
- 2006 – Jens Petersson (Stockholms KK)
- 2007 – Pontus Renholm (Stockholmspolisens IF)
- 2008 – Pontus Renholm (Stockholmspolisens IF)
- 2009 – Niklas Borin (Turebergs SK)
- 2010 – Niklas Borin (Turebergs SK)
- 2011 – Niklas Borin (Turebergs SK)
- 2012 – Pontus Renholm (Stockholmspolisens IF)
- 2013 – Mattias Carlsson (Uddevalla Sim)
- 2014 – Christoffer Carlsen (Mölndals ASS)
- 2015 – Niklas Borin (Turebergs SK)
- 2016 – Stefan Stojmenovic (Norrköpings KK)
- 2017 – Jesper Björk (Helsingborgs S)
- 2018 – Simon Sjödin (SK Neptun)
- 2019 – Gustav Hökfelt (SK Neptun)
- 2021 – Gustav Hökfelt (SK Neptun)
- 2022 – Björn Seeliger (Stockholms KK)

=== 100 metre backstroke ===
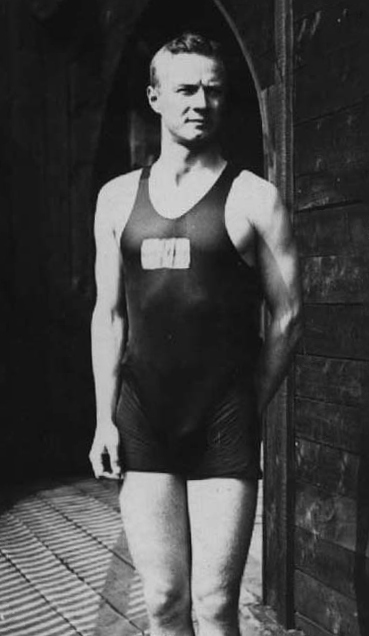
Stockholms KK swimmer Harald Julin won the inaugural title in the 100 metre backstroke event in 1910 and then continued to win the following four

- 1910 – Harald Julin (Stockholms KK)
- 1911 – Harald Julin (Stockholms KK)
- 1912 – Harald Julin (Stockholms KK)
- 1913 – Harald Julin (Stockholms KK)
- 1914 – Harald Julin (Stockholms KK)
- 1915 – Arthur Rothstein (Malmö S)
- 1916 – Harald Julin (Stockholms KK)
- 1917 – Harald Julin (Stockholms KK)
- 1918 – Per Holmström (SK Delfin)
- 1919 – Per Holmström (SK Delfin)
- 1920 – Per Holmström (SK Delfin)
- 1921 – Per Holmström (SK Delfin)
- 1922 – Per Holmström (SK Delfin)
- 1923 – Arne Borg (Stockholms KK)
- 1924 – Per Holmström (Simavdelningen 1902)
- 1925 – Roland Johansson (Norrköpings KK)
- 1926 – Roland Johansson (Norrköpings KK)
- 1927 – Roland Johansson (Norrköpings KK)
- 1928 – Roland Johansson (Norrköpings KK)
- 1929 – Eskil Lundahl (SoIK Hellas)
- 1930 – Lars Lundvik (Limhamns SS)
- 1931 – Lars Lundvik (Limhamns SS)
- 1932 – Lars Lundvik (Limhamns SS)
- 1933 – Lars Lundvik (Limhamns SS)
- 1934 – Eskil Lundahl (SoIK Hellas)
- 1935 – Lars Lundvik (Limhamns SS)
- 1936 – Per Carleson (Stockholms KK)
- 1937 – Sven Särne (Västerviks SS)
- 1938 – Björn Borg (Norrköpings KK)
- 1939 – Björn Borg (Norrköpings KK)
- 1940 – Björn Borg (Norrköpings KK)
- 1941 – Björn Borg (Norrköpings KK)
- 1942 – Per-Olof Olsson (SoIK Hellas)
- 1943 – Bertil Persson (SK Ran)
- 1944 – Per-Olof Olsson (SoIK Hellas)
- 1945 – Bertil Persson (SK Ran)
- 1946 – Bertil Persson (SK Ran)
- 1947 – Bertil Persson (SK Ran)
- 1948 – Bertil Persson (SK Ran)
- 1949 – Göran Larsson (Stockholms KK)
- 1950 – Göran Larsson (Stockholms KK)
- 1951 – Göran Larsson (Stockholms KK)
- 1952 – Göran Larsson (Stockholms KK)
- 1953 – Göran Larsson (Stockholms KK)
- 1954 – Göran Larsson (Stockholms KK)
- 1955 – Göran Larsson (Simavdelningen 1902)
- 1956 – Hans Andersson (Tunafors SK)
- 1957 – Hans Andersson (Tunafors SK)
- 1958 – Bengt-Olov Almstedt (Örebro SS)
- 1959 – Ulf-Göran Johansson (IF Elfsborg)
- 1960 – Bengt-Olov Almstedt (Örebro SS)
- 1965 – Hans Tegeback (Sundsvalls SS)
- 1966 – Hans Tegeback (Sundsvalls SS)
- 1967 – Hans Tegeback (Sundsvalls SS)
- 1968 – Hans Tegeback (Sundsvalls SS)
- 1969 – Hans Tegeback (Sundsvalls SS)
- 1970 – Hans Tegeback (Sundsvalls SS)
- 1971 – Svante Zetterlund (Karlskoga SS)
- 1972 – Anders Sandberg (Eskilstuna SS)
- 1973 – Svante Zetterlund (Karlskoga SS)
- 1974 – Svante Zetterlund (Karlskoga SS)
- 1975 – Mikael Brandén (Stockholmspolisens IF)
- 1976 – Jan Thorell (Stockholmspolisens IF)
- 1977 – Jan Thorell (Stockholmspolisens IF)
- 1978 – Jan Thorell (Stockholmspolisens IF)
- 1979 – Bengt Baron (Finspångs SK)
- 1980 – Bengt Baron (SK Korrugal)
- 1981 – Bengt Baron (SK Korrugal)
- 1982 – Bengt Baron (SK Korrugal)
- 1983 – Bengt Baron (SK Korrugal)
- 1984 – Bengt Baron (SK Korrugal)
- 1985 – Bengt Baron (SK Korrugal)
- 1986 – Hans Fredin (Södertörns SS)
- 1987 – Hans Fredin (Södertörns SS)
- 1988 – Niklas Håkansson (Stockholmspolisens IF)
- 1989 – Niklas Håkansson (Stockholmspolisens IF)
- 1990 – Niklas Håkansson (Stockholmspolisens IF)
- 1991 – Rudi Dollmayer (SK Ran)
- 1992 – Zsolt Hegmegi (Jönköpings SS)
- 1993 – Daniel Lönnberg (Karlskrona SS)
- 1994 – Daniel Lönnberg (Karlskrona SS)
- 1995 – Daniel Lönnberg (Växjö SS)
- 1996 – Pär Gustafsson (Ängelholms SS)
- 1997 – Mattias Ohlin (Trelleborgs SS)
- 1998 – Mattias Ohlin (Trelleborgs SS)
- 1999 – Mattias Ohlin (Trelleborgs SS)
- 2000 – Mattias Ohlin (Trelleborgs SS)
- 2001 – Daniel Lönnberg (Sundsvalls SS)
- 2002 – Jens Petersson (Stockholms KK)
- 2003 – Jens Petersson (Stockholms KK)
- 2004 – Jens Petersson (Stockholms KK)
- 2005 – Pontus Renholm (Stockholmspolisens IF)
- 2006 – Pierre Roger (Väsby SS)
- 2007 – Konstantin Sundin (Spårvägens SF)
- 2008 – Pontus Renholm (Stockholmspolisens IF)
- 2009 – Mikael Ramkvist (SK Lödde)
- 2010 – Mattias Carlsson (Uddevalla Sim)
- 2011 – Mattias Carlsson (Uddevalla Sim)
- 2012 – Mattias Carlsson (Uddevalla Sim)
- 2013 – Mattias Carlsson (Uddevalla Sim)
- 2014 – Mattias Carlsson (Uddevalla Sim)
- 2015 – Mattias Carlsson (Uddevalla Sim)
- 2016 – Simon Sjödin (SK Neptun)
- 2017 – Simon Sjödin (SK Neptun)
- 2018 – Simon Sjödin (SK Neptun)
- 2019 – Samuel Törnqvist (Täby Sim)
- 2021 – Samuel Törnqvist (Täby Sim)
- 2022 – Samuel Törnqvist (Spårvägens SF)

=== 200 metre backstroke ===
- 1961 – Bengt-Olov Almstedt (Örebro SS)
- 1962 – Bengt-Olov Almstedt (Örebro SS)
- 1963 – Jan Lundin (Stockholmspolisens IF)
- 1964 – Leif Sjöblom (SK Neptun)
- 1965 – Olle Ferm (Norrköpings KK)
- 1966 – Olle Ferm (Norrköpings KK)
- 1967 – Hans Ljungberg (Bromma SS)
- 1968 – Hans Ljungberg (Bromma SS)
- 1969 – Gunnar Larsson (Malmö S)
- 1970 – Gunnar Larsson (Malmö S)
- 1971 – Svante Zetterlund (Karlskoga SS)
- 1972 – Anders Sandberg (Eskilstuna SS)
- 1973 – Leif Ericsson (Upsala S)
- 1974 – Leif Ericsson (Upsala S)
- 1975 – Mikael Brandén (Stockholmspolisens IF)
- 1976 – Leif Ericsson (Upsala S)
- 1977 – Jan Thorell (Stockholmspolisens IF)
- 1978 – Jan Thorell (Stockholmspolisens IF)
- 1979 – Michael Söderlund (Karlskrona SS)
- 1980 – Michael Söderlund (Karlskrona SS)
- 1981 – Michael Söderlund (Karlskrona SS)
- 1982 – Bengt Baron (SK Korrugal)
- 1983 – Michael Söderlund (Karlskrona SS)
- 1984 – Michael Söderlund (Karlskrona SS)
- 1985 – Michael Söderlund (Karlskrona SS)
- 1986 – Hans Fredin (Södertörns SS)
- 1987 – Hans Fredin (Södertörns SS)
- 1988 – Jan Bidrman (Malmö KK)
- 1989 – Anders Kroon (Upsala S)
- 1990 – Niklas Håkansson (Stockholmspolisens IF)
- 1991 – Anders Kroon (Upsala S)
- 1992 – Pär Gustafsson (Ängelholms SS)
- 1993 – Martin Svensson (Jönköpings SS)
- 1994 – Fredrik Lundin (Malmö KK)
- 1995 – Pär Gustafsson (Ängelholms SS)
- 1996 – Pär Gustafsson (Ängelholms SS)
- 1997 – Michael Jacobsson (Täby Sim)
- 1998 – Mattias Ohlin (Trelleborgs SS)
- 1999 – Michael Jacobsson (Täby Sim)
- 2000 – Michael Jacobsson (Täby Sim)
- 2001 – Michael Jacobsson (Täby Sim)
- 2002 – Michael Jacobsson (Täby Sim)
- 2003 – Michael Jacobsson (Täby Sim)
- 2004 – Sten-Olof Gustafsson (Malmö KK)
- 2005 – Pontus Renholm (Stockholmspolisens IF)
- 2006 – Pierre Roger (Väsby SS)
- 2007 – Konstantin Sundin (Spårvägens SF)
- 2008 – Mattias Carlsson (Uddevalla Sim)
- 2009 – Simon Sjödin (SK Neptun)
- 2010 – Mattias Carlsson (Uddevalla Sim)
- 2011 – Kristian Kron (Helsingborgs S)
- 2012 – Kristian Kron (Helsingborgs S)
- 2013 – Mattias Carlsson (Uddevalla Sim)
- 2014 – Axel Pettersson (Jönköpings SS)
- 2015 – Mattias Carlsson (Uddevalla Sim)
- 2016 – Kristian Kron (Helsingborgs S)
- 2017 – Petter Fredriksson (Malmö KK)
- 2018 – Samuel Törnqvist (Täby Sim)
- 2019 – Samuel Törnqvist (Täby Sim)
- 2021 – William Lulek (SK Neptun)
- 2022 – William Lulek (SK Neptun)

=== 50 metre breaststroke ===
- 1993 – Patric Robertsson (Södertälje SS)
- 1994 – Patric Robertsson (Södertälje SS)
- 1995 – Patric Robertsson (Södertälje SS)
- 1996 – Jens Johansson (Sundsvalls SS)
- 1998 – Jens Johansson (Sundsvalls SS)
- 1999 – Jens Johansson (Sundsvalls SS)
- 2000 – Patrik Isaksson (Västerås SS)
- 2001 – Patrik Isaksson (Västerås SS)
- 2002 – Martin Gustavsson (Malmö KK)
- 2003 – Martin Gustavsson (Malmö KK)
- 2004 – Martin Gustavsson (Malmö KK)
- 2005 – Martin Gustavsson (Malmö KK)
- 2006 – Martin Gustavsson (Malmö KK)
- 2007 – Jonas Andersson (SK Neptun)
- 2008 – Martin Gustavsson (Malmö KK)
- 2009 – Niklas Tour (SK Neptun)
- 2010 – Mattias Kahlin (Västerås SS)
- 2011 – Johan Johansson (Täby Sim)
- 2012 – Johan Johansson (Täby Sim)
- 2013 – Jacob Zeidler (SK Lödde)
- 2014 – Johannes Skagius (Sundsvalls SS)
- 2015 – Johannes Skagius (Sundsvalls SS)
- 2016 – Johannes Skagius (Sundsvalls SS)
- 2017 – Johannes Skagius (Sundsvalls SS)
- 2018 – Johannes Skagius (SK Neptun)
- 2019 – Johannes Skagius (SK Neptun)
- 2021 – Daniel Räisänen (Täby Sim)
- 2022 – Daniel Räisänen (Täby Sim)

=== 100 metre breaststroke ===
- 1948 – Bo Larsson (Västerås SS)
- 1953 – Bo Eriksson (SoIK Hellas)
- 1961 – Roland Lundin (SK Ran)
- 1962 – Roland Lundin (SK Ran)
- 1963 – Roland Lundin (SK Ran)
- 1964 – Håkan Kindblom (Västerås SS)
- 1965 – Thomas Johnsson (Skövde SS)
- 1966 – Thomas Johnsson (Skövde SS)
- 1967 – Thomas Johnsson (Skövde SS)
- 1968 – Thomas Johnsson (Skövde SS)
- 1969 – Thomas Johnsson (Skövde SS)
- 1970 – Thomas Johnsson (Skövde SS)
- 1971 – Göran Eriksson (SK Najaden)
- 1972 – Anders Häggqvist (Timrå AIF)
- 1973 – Göran Eriksson (SK Najaden)
- 1974 – Glen Christiansen (SK Najaden)
- 1975 – Glen Christiansen (Simavdelningen 1902)
- 1976 – Anders Norling (Stockholmspolisens IF)
- 1977 – Glen Christiansen (Simavdelningen 1902)
- 1978 – Jan Sjöström (IFK Lidingö)
- 1979 – Peter Berggren (Skärets SS)
- 1980 – Peter Berggren (Skärets SS)
- 1981 – Hans Bergqvist (Sundsvalls SS)
- 1982 – Peter Berggren (Skärets SS)
- 1983 – Peter Berggren (Skärets SS)
- 1984 – Peter Berggren (Skärets SS)
- 1985 – Peter Berggren (Skärets SS)
- 1986 – Henrik Tagesson (Örebro Simallians)
- 1987 – Peter Berggren (Skärets SS)
- 1988 – Jan Stensson (Upsala S)
- 1989 – Jan Stensson (Upsala S)
- 1990 – Peter Karlsson (Västerås SS)
- 1991 – Jan Stensson (Upsala S)
- 1992 – Anders Bengtsson (SK Triton)
- 1993 – Michael Alpfors (Malmö KK)
- 1994 – Peter Karlsson (Västerås SS)
- 1995 – Stefan Scherling (Spårvägens SF)
- 1996 – Jens Johansson (Sundsvalls SS)
- 1997 – Jens Johansson (Sundsvalls SS)
- 1998 – Patrik Isaksson (Västerås SS)
- 1999 – Jens Johansson (Sundsvalls SS)
- 2000 – Martin Gustavsson (Malmö KK)
- 2001 – Martin Gustavsson (Malmö KK)
- 2002 – Martin Gustavsson (Malmö KK)
- 2003 – Martin Gustavsson (Malmö KK)
- 2004 – Martin Gustavsson (Malmö KK)
- 2005 – Martin Gustavsson (Malmö KK)
- 2006 – Martin Gustavsson (Malmö KK)
- 2007 – Jonas Andersson (SK Neptun)
- 2008 – Mattias Kahlin (Västerås SS)
- 2009 – Niklas Tour (SK Neptun)
- 2010 – Martti Aljand (Helsingborgs S)
- 2011 – Johan Johansson (Täby Sim)
- 2012 – Petros Katsampanis (Spårvägens SF)
- 2013 – Andreas Fürst (Väsby SS)
- 2014 – Erik Persson (Kungsbacka SS)
- 2015 – Erik Persson (Kungsbacka SS)
- 2016 – Erik Persson (Kungsbacka SS)
- 2017 – Erik Persson (Kungsbacka SS)
- 2018 – Erik Persson (Kungsbacka SS)
- 2019 – Daniel Räisänen (Täby Sim)
- 2021 – Adam Paulsson (SK Elfsborg)
- 2022 – Daniel Räisänen (Täby Sim)

=== 200 metre breaststroke ===
- 1914 – Thor Henning (SK Neptun)
- 1915 – Thor Henning (SK Neptun)
- 1916 – Arthur Rothstein (Malmö S)
- 1917 – Thor Henning (SK Neptun)
- 1918 – Håkan Malmrot (Örebro SS)
- 1919 – Thor Henning (SK Neptun)
- 1920 – Thor Henning (SK Neptun)
- 1921 – Thor Henning (SK Neptun)
- 1922 – Håkan Malmrot (Örebro SS)
- 1923 – Erik Andersson (Simavdelningen 1902)
- 1924 – Bengt Linders (Stockholms KK)
- 1925 – Bengt Linders (Stockholms KK)
- 1926 – Bengt Linders (Stockholms KK)
- 1927 – Erik Harling (Stockholms KK)
- 1928 – Erik Harling (Stockholms KK)
- 1929 – Erik Harling (Stockholms KK)
- 1930 – Erik Harling (Stockholms KK)
- 1931 – Erik Harling (Stockholms KK)
- 1932 – Erik Harling (Stockholms KK)
- 1933 – Sigfrid Heyner (Stockholms KK)
- 1934 – Sigfrid Heyner (Stockholms KK)
- 1935 – Erik Harling (Stockholms KK)
- 1936 – Vilgot Johansson (Kalmar SS)
- 1937 – John Rothman (Stockholms KK)
- 1938 – John Rothman (Stockholms KK)
- 1939 – John Rothman (Stockholms KK)
- 1940 – John Rothman (Stockholms KK)
- 1941 – John Rothman (Stockholms KK)
- 1942 – Gunnar Sulling (SoIK Hellas)
- 1943 – Rune Hellgren (SoIK Hellas)
- 1944 – John Rothman (Stockholms KK)
- 1945 – John Rothman (Stockholms KK)
- 1946 – Bo Larsson (Västerås SS)
- 1947 – John Rothman (Stockholms KK)
- 1948 – John Rothman (Stockholms KK)
- 1949 – John Rothman (Stockholms KK)
- 1950 – John Rothman (Stockholms KK)
- 1951 – Bo Larsson (Västerås SS)
- 1952 – Bo Larsson (Västerås SS)
- 1953 – Bo Eriksson (SoIK Hellas)
- 1954 – Sven-Gunnar Karlsson (Norrköpings KK)
- 1955 – Sven-Gunnar Karlsson (Norrköpings KK)
- 1956 – Sven-Gunnar Karlsson (Norrköpings KK)
- 1957 – Rolf Junefelt (Jönköpings SLS)
- 1958 – Tommie Lindström (Stockholmspolisens IF)
- 1959 – Tommie Lindström (Stockholmspolisens IF)
- 1960 – Tommie Lindström (Stockholmspolisens IF)
- 1961 – Tommie Lindström (Stockholmspolisens IF)
- 1962 – Roland Lundin (SK Ran)
- 1963 – Ulf Ericsson (Katrineholms SS)
- 1964 – Björn Finnsson (Stockholmspolisens IF)
- 1965 – Thomas Johnsson (Skövde SS)
- 1966 – Thomas Johnsson (Skövde SS)
- 1967 – Thomas Johnsson (Skövde SS)
- 1968 – Thomas Johnsson (Skövde SS)
- 1969 – Thomas Johnsson (Skövde SS)
- 1970 – Thomas Johnsson (Skövde SS)
- 1971 – Göran Eriksson (SK Najaden)
- 1972 – Tomas Kensén (Karlskoga SS)
- 1973 – Anders Norling (Stockholmspolisens IF)
- 1974 – Stefan Andersson (Nyköpings SS)
- 1975 – Glen Christiansen (Simavdelningen 1902)
- 1976 – Anders Norling (Stockholmspolisens IF)
- 1977 – Glen Christiansen (Simavdelningen 1902)
- 1978 – Glen Christiansen (Simavdelningen 1902)
- 1979 – Peter Berggren (Skärets SS)
- 1980 – Peter Berggren (Skärets SS)
- 1981 – Peter Berggren (Skärets SS)
- 1982 – Peter Berggren (Skärets SS)
- 1983 – Peter Berggren (Skärets SS)
- 1984 – Peter Berggren (Skärets SS)
- 1985 – Peter Berggren (Skärets SS)
- 1986 – Anders Peterson (Mariestads SS)
- 1987 – Anders Stensson (Hagfors SS)
- 1988 – Jan Bidrman (Malmö KK)
- 1989 – Jan Bidrman (Malmö KK)
- 1990 – Joakim Adolfsson (Norrköpings KK)
- 1991 – Magnus Leth (SK Poseidon)
- 1992 – Michael Alpfors (Malmö KK)
- 1993 – Fredrik Rosenholm (Spårvägens SF)
- 1994 – Peter Karlsson (Västerås SS)
- 1995 – Fredrik Rosenholm (Spårvägens SF)
- 1996 – Fredrik Rosenholm (Spårvägens SF)
- 1997 – Fredrik Rosenholm (Spårvägens SF)
- 1998 – Peter Aronsson (Spårvägens SF)
- 1999 – Christian Clausen (Trelleborgs SS)
- 2000 – Martin Gustavsson (Malmö KK)
- 2001 – Martin Gustavsson (Malmö KK)
- 2002 – Martin Gustavsson (Malmö KK)
- 2003 – Martin Gustavsson (Malmö KK)
- 2004 – Martin Gustavsson (Malmö KK)
- 2005 – Martin Gustavsson (Malmö KK)
- 2006 – Martin Gustavsson (Malmö KK)
- 2007 – Jonas Andersson (SK Neptun)
- 2008 – Anton Lagerqvist (Göteborg Sim)
- 2009 – Anton Lagerqvist (Göteborg Sim)
- 2010 – Anton Lagerqvist (Göteborg Sim)
- 2011 – Anton Lagerqvist (Göteborg Sim)
- 2012 – Petros Katsampanis (Spårvägens SF)
- 2013 – Erik Persson (Kungsbacka SS)
- 2014 – Erik Persson (Kungsbacka SS)
- 2015 – Erik Persson (Kungsbacka SS)
- 2016 – Erik Persson (Kungsbacka SS)
- 2017 – Erik Persson (Kungsbacka SS)
- 2018 – Erik Persson (Kungsbacka SS)
- 2019 – Erik Persson (Kungsbacka SS)
- 2021 – Adam Paulsson (SK Elfsborg)
- 2022 – Daniel Räisänen (Täby Sim)

=== 50 metre butterfly ===
- 1994 – Jan Karlsson (Borlänge SS)
- 1995 – Jonas Åkesson (Södertälje SS)
- 1996 – Jonas Åkesson (Södertälje SS)
- 1998 – Lars Frölander (Sundsvalls SS)
- 1999 – Dan Lindström (Trelleborgs SS)
- 2000 – Daniel Carlsson (Väsby SS)
- 2001 – Lars Frölander (Sundsvalls SS)
- 2002 – Lars Frölander (Linköpings ASS)
- 2003 – Lars Frölander (Linköpings ASS)
- 2004 – Lars Frölander (Linköpings ASS)
- 2005 – Lars Frölander (Linköpings ASS)
- 2006 – Lars Frölander (Linköpings ASS)
- 2007 – Lars Frölander (Linköpings ASS)
- 2008 – Lars Frölander (Linköpings ASS)
- 2009 – Lars Frölander (Linköpings ASS)
- 2010 – Lars Frölander (Linköpings ASS)
- 2011 – Lars Frölander (Linköpings ASS)
- 2012 – Lars Frölander (Linköpings ASS)
- 2013 – Henrik Lindau (Karlskrona SS)
- 2014 – Sebastian Holmberg (SK Neptun)
- 2015 – Sebastian Holmberg (SK Neptun)
- 2016 – Sebastian Holmberg (SK Neptun)
- 2017 – Jesper Björk (Helsingborgs S)
- 2018 – Christoffer Carlsen (Helsingborgs S)
- 2019 – Dan Lester (Linköpings ASS)
- 2021 – Simon Sjödin (SK Neptun)
- 2022 – Oskar Hoff (Landskrona SS)

=== 100 metre butterfly ===
- 1949 – Bo Larsson (Västerås SS)
- 1950 – Bengt Rask (Stockholms KK)
- 1951 – Bengt Rask (Stockholms KK)
- 1952 – Bo Larsson (Västerås SS)
- 1965 – Ingvar Eriksson (Sundsvalls SS)
- 1966 – Ingvar Eriksson (Sundsvalls SS)
- 1967 – Ingvar Eriksson (Sundsvalls SS)
- 1968 – Ingvar Eriksson (Sundsvalls SS)
- 1969 – Bo Westergren (Stockholmspolisens IF)
- 1970 – Bo Westergren (Stockholmspolisens IF)
- 1971 – Hans Ljungberg (Timrå AIF)
- 1972 – Per Berglund (Spårvägens GoIF)
- 1973 – Per Berglund (Spårvägens GoIF)
- 1974 – Bob Casting (Spårvägens GoIF)
- 1975 – Bengt Gingsjö (Simavdelningen 1902)
- 1976 – Pär Arvidsson (Finspångs SK)
- 1977 – Tommy Lindell (Stockholmspolisens IF)
- 1978 – Pär Arvidsson (Finspångs SK)
- 1979 – Tommy Lindell (Stockholmspolisens IF)
- 1980 – Pär Arvidsson (SK Korrugal)
- 1981 – Pär Arvidsson (SK Korrugal)
- 1982 – Bengt Baron (SK Korrugal)
- 1983 – Bengt Baron (SK Korrugal)
- 1984 – Bengt Baron (SK Korrugal)
- 1985 – Thomas Lejdström (Västerås SS)
- 1986 – Thomas Lejdström (Västerås SS)
- 1987 – Thomas Lejdström (Västerås SS)
- 1988 – Christer Wallin (Mölndals ASS)
- 1989 – Christer Wallin (Mölndals ASS)
- 1990 – Jonas Lögdberg (Täby Sim)
- 1991 – Rudi Dollmayer (SK Ran)
- 1992 – Jonas Lögdberg (Täby Sim)
- 1993 – Lars Frölander (Borlänge SS)
- 1994 – Gustaf Johansson (SK Neptun)
- 1995 – Johan Setterberg (Mölndals ASS)
- 1996 – Johan Setterberg (Mölndals ASS)
- 1997 – Lars Frölander (Sundsvalls SS)
- 1998 – Lars Frölander (Sundsvalls SS)
- 1999 – Lars Frölander (Sundsvalls SS)
- 2000 – Lars Frölander (Sundsvalls SS)
- 2001 – Lars Frölander (Sundsvalls SS)
- 2002 – Lars Frölander (Linköpings ASS)
- 2003 – Lars Frölander (Linköpings ASS)
- 2004 – Erik Andersson (Trollhättans SS)
- 2005 – Erik Andersson (Trollhättans SS)
- 2006 – Lars Frölander (Linköpings ASS)
- 2007 – Lars Frölander (Linköpings ASS)
- 2008 – Lars Frölander (Linköpings ASS)
- 2009 – Lars Frölander (Linköpings ASS)
- 2010 – Lars Frölander (Linköpings ASS)
- 2011 – Lars Frölander (Linköpings ASS)
- 2012 – Lars Frölander (Linköpings ASS)
- 2013 – Jacob Thulin (SK Neptun)
- 2014 – Jesper Jonsson (Uddevalla Sim)
- 2015 – Oscar Ekström (Linköpings ASS)
- 2016 – Jesper Björk (Helsingborgs S)
- 2017 – Jesper Jonsson (Södertörns SS)
- 2018 – Jesper Jonsson (Södertörns SS)
- 2019 – Jesper Jonsson (Södertörns SS)
- 2021 – Oskar Hoff (Landskrona SS)
- 2022 – Oskar Hoff (Landskrona SS)

=== 200 metre butterfly ===
- 1949 – Bengt Rask (Stockholms KK)
- 1950 – Bengt Rask (Stockholms KK)
- 1951 – Bengt Rask (Stockholms KK)
- 1952 – Bengt Rask (Stockholms KK)
- 1953 – Jan Olof Larsson (Malmö S)
- 1954 – Bo Larsson (SK Neptun)
- 1955 – Bo Larsson (SK Neptun)
- 1956 – Bo Larsson (SK Neptun)
- 1957 – Hans-Erik Malmberg (Simavdelningen 1902)
- 1958 – Willy Hemlin (Simavdelningen 1902)
- 1959 – Håkan Bengtsson (Stockholmspolisens IF)
- 1960 – Håkan Bengtsson (Stockholmspolisens IF)
- 1961 – Håkan Bengtsson (Stockholmspolisens IF)
- 1962 – Håkan Bengtsson (Stockholmspolisens IF)
- 1963 – Ingvar Eriksson (Sundsvalls SS)
- 1964 – Ingvar Eriksson (Sundsvalls SS)
- 1965 – Peter Feil (Eskilstuna SS)
- 1966 – Peter Feil (Eskilstuna SS)
- 1967 – Ingvar Eriksson (Sundsvalls SS)
- 1968 – Peter Feil (Eskilstuna SS)
- 1969 – Anders Bellbring (Upsala S)
- 1970 – Peter Feil (Eskilstuna SS)
- 1971 – Bengt Gingsjö (Simavdelningen 1902)
- 1972 – Bengt Gingsjö (Simavdelningen 1902)
- 1973 – Anders Bellbring (Limhamns SS)
- 1974 – Anders Bellbring (Simavdelningen 1902)
- 1975 – Anders Bellbring (Simavdelningen 1902)
- 1976 – Pär Arvidsson (Finspångs SK)
- 1977 – Ove Nylén (Kumla SS)
- 1978 – Pär Arvidsson (Finspångs SK)
- 1979 – Ove Nylén (Kristianstads SLS)
- 1980 – Pär Arvidsson (SK Korrugal)
- 1981 – Thomas Lejdström (Västerås SS)
- 1982 – Pär Arvidsson (SK Korrugal)
- 1983 – Pär Arvidsson (SK Korrugal)
- 1984 – Thomas Lejdström (Västerås SS)
- 1985 – Thomas Lejdström (Västerås SS)
- 1986 – Jan Bidrman (Malmö KK)
- 1987 – Jan Bidrman (Malmö KK)
- 1988 – Christer Wallin (Mölndals ASS)
- 1989 – Christer Wallin (Mölndals ASS)
- 1990 – Jan Bidrman (Malmö KK)
- 1991 – Gustaf Johansson (SK Neptun)
- 1992 – Jan Bidrman (Malmö KK)
- 1993 – Gustaf Johansson (Stockholmspolisens IF)
- 1994 – Gustaf Johansson (SK Neptun)
- 1995 – Fredrik Lundin (Ystads SS)
- 1996 – Fredrik Lundin (Ystads SS)
- 1997 – Fredrik Lundin (SK Neptun)
- 1998 – Joakim Dahl (Landskrona SS)
- 1999 – Carl Gårdmark (Ystads SS)
- 2000 – Tero Välimaa (SK Neptun)
- 2001 – Tero Välimaa (SK Neptun)
- 2002 – Tero Välimaa (SK Neptun)
- 2003 – Tero Välimaa (SK Neptun)
- 2004 – Jonatan Dahlberg (SK Neptun)
- 2005 – Simon Sjödin (Södertörns SS)
- 2006 – Pierre Roger (Väsby SS)
- 2007 – Simon Sjödin (Södertörns SS)
- 2008 – Linus Junefelt (Jönköpings SS)
- 2009 – Christoffer Wallin (Helsingborgs S)
- 2010 – Simon Sjödin (SK Neptun)
- 2011 – Jesper Björk (Järfälla Sim)
- 2012 – Jesper Björk (Järfälla Sim)
- 2013 – Simon Sjödin (SK Neptun)
- 2014 – Simon Sjödin (SK Neptun)
- 2015 – Simon Sjödin (SK Neptun)
- 2016 – Simon Sjödin (SK Neptun)
- 2017 – Simon Sjödin (SK Neptun)
- 2018 – Nils Liess (Kungsbacka SS)
- 2019 – Samuel Törnqvist (Täby Sim)
- 2021 – Victor Klingeryd Jalamo (Helsingborgs S)
- 2022 – Victor Johansson (Jönköpings SS)

=== 200 metre individual medley ===
- 1965 – Hans Ljungberg (SK Neptun)
- 1966 – Hans Ljungberg (Bromma SS)
- 1967 – Hans Ljungberg (Bromma SS)
- 1968 – Hans Ljungberg (Bromma SS)
- 1969 – Gunnar Larsson (Malmö S)
- 1970 – Gunnar Larsson (Malmö S)
- 1971 – Gunnar Larsson (Malmö S)
- 1972 – Gunnar Larsson (Malmö S)
- 1973 – Gunnar Larsson (Malmö S)
- 1974 – Anders Bellbring (Simavdelningen 1902)
- 1975 – Bengt Gingsjö (Simavdelningen 1902)
- 1976 – Bengt Svensson (Upsala S)
- 1977 – Bengt Svensson (Upsala S)
- 1978 – Gary Andersson (Kristianstads SLS)
- 1979 – Gary Andersson (Kristianstads SLS)
- 1980 – Mikael Örn (Ystads SS)
- 1981 – Bengt Baron (SK Korrugal)
- 1982 – Anders Peterson (Mariestads SS)
- 1983 – Anders Peterson (Mariestads SS)
- 1984 – Anders Peterson (Mariestads SS)
- 1985 – Anders Peterson (Mariestads SS)
- 1986 – Anders Peterson (Mariestads SS)
- 1987 – Anders Peterson (Mariestads SS)
- 1988 – Jan Bidrman (Malmö KK)
- 1989 – Jan Bidrman (Malmö KK)
- 1990 – Jan Bidrman (Malmö KK)
- 1991 – Anders Peterson (Upsala S)
- 1992 – Jan Bidrman (Malmö KK)
- 1993 – Anders Holmertz (Spårvägens SF)
- 1994 – Daniel Karlsson (Täby Sim)
- 1995 – Anders Holmertz (Spårvägens SF)
- 1996 – Anders Holmertz (Spårvägens SF)
- 1997 – Michael Jacobsson (Täby Sim)
- 1998 – Michael Jacobsson (Täby Sim)
- 1999 – Michael Jacobsson (Täby Sim)
- 2000 – Michael Jacobsson (Täby Sim)
- 2001 – Jesper Levander (Södertörns SS)
- 2002 – Michael Jacobsson (Täby Sim)
- 2003 – Michael Jacobsson (Täby Sim)
- 2004 – Axel Pettersson (SK Neptun)
- 2005 – Axel Pettersson (SK Neptun)
- 2006 – Erik Samuelsson (Väsby SS)
- 2007 – Erik Samuelsson (Väsby SS)
- 2008 – Erik Samuelsson (Väsby SS)
- 2009 – Simon Sjödin (SK Neptun)
- 2010 – Simon Sjödin (SK Neptun)
- 2011 – Simon Sjödin (SK Neptun)
- 2012 – Simon Frank (SK Neptun)
- 2013 – Simon Sjödin (SK Neptun)
- 2014 – Simon Sjödin (SK Neptun)
- 2015 – Simon Sjödin (SK Neptun)
- 2016 – Simon Sjödin (SK Neptun)
- 2017 – Simon Sjödin (SK Neptun)
- 2018 – Simon Sjödin (SK Neptun)
- 2019 – Samuel Törnqvist (Täby Sim)
- 2021 – Adam Paulsson (SK Elfsborg)
- 2022 – William Lulek (SK Neptun)

=== 400 metre individual medley ===
- 1961 – Jan Lundin (Stockholmspolisens IF)
- 1962 – Sten Ekman (Tunafors SK)
- 1963 – Jan Lundin (Stockholmspolisens IF)
- 1964 – Olle Ferm (Norrköpings KK)
- 1965 – Olle Ferm (Norrköpings KK)
- 1966 – Peter Feil (Eskilstuna SS)
- 1967 – Hans Ljungberg (Bromma SS)
- 1968 – Hans Ljungberg (Bromma SS)
- 1969 – Hans Ljungberg (Bromma SS)
- 1970 – Gunnar Larsson (Malmö S)
- 1971 – Gunnar Larsson (Malmö S)
- 1972 – Bengt Gingsjö (Simavdelningen 1902)
- 1973 – Anders Bellbring (Limhamns SS)
- 1974 – Bengt Gingsjö (Simavdelningen 1902)
- 1975 – Bengt Gingsjö (Simavdelningen 1902)
- 1976 – Leif Ericsson (Upsala S)
- 1977 – Gary Andersson (Kristianstads SLS)
- 1978 – Gary Andersson (Kristianstads SLS)
- 1979 – Thomas Lejdström (Västerås SS)
- 1980 – Thomas Lejdström (Västerås SS)
- 1981 – Thomas Lejdström (Västerås SS)
- 1982 – Thomas Lejdström (Västerås SS)
- 1983 – Anders Peterson (Mariestads SS)
- 1984 – Anders Peterson (Mariestads SS)
- 1985 – Anders Peterson (Mariestads SS)
- 1986 – Jan Bidrman (Malmö KK)
- 1987 – Jan Bidrman (Malmö KK)
- 1988 – Jan Bidrman (Malmö KK)
- 1989 – Jan Bidrman (Malmö KK)
- 1990 – Jan Bidrman (Malmö KK)
- 1991 – Fredrik Lundin (Ystads SS)
- 1992 – Jan Bidrman (Malmö KK)
- 1993 – Fredrik Lundin (Malmö KK)
- 1994 – Fredrik Lundin (Malmö KK)
- 1995 – Pär Gustafsson (Ängelholms SS)
- 1996 – Daniel Karlsson (Täby Sim)
- 1997 – Michael Jacobsson (Täby Sim)
- 1998 – Michael Jacobsson (Täby Sim)
- 1999 – Michael Jacobsson (Täby Sim)
- 2000 – Michael Jacobsson (Täby Sim)
- 2001 – Michael Jacobsson (Täby Sim)
- 2002 – Michael Jacobsson (Täby Sim)
- 2003 – Michael Jacobsson (Täby Sim)
- 2004 – Axel Pettersson (SK Neptun)
- 2005 – Axel Pettersson (SK Neptun)
- 2006 – Erik Samuelsson (Väsby SS)
- 2007 – Erik Samuelsson (Väsby SS)
- 2008 – Christoffer Wallin (Helsingborgs S)
- 2009 – Christoffer Wallin (Helsingborgs S)
- 2010 – Martin Persson (Helsingborgs S)
- 2011 – Linus Kanth (Västerås SS)
- 2012 – Kristian Kron (Helsingborgs S)
- 2013 – Kristian Kron (Helsingborgs S)
- 2014 – Simon Sjödin (SK Neptun)
- 2015 – Erik Persson (Kungsbacka SS)
- 2016 – Adam Paulsson (SK Elfsborg)
- 2017 – Adam Paulsson (SK Elfsborg)
- 2018 – Adam Paulsson (SK Elfsborg)
- 2019 – Samuel Törnqvist (Täby Sim)
- 2021 – Adam Paulsson (SK Elfsborg)
- 2022 – William Lulek (SK Neptun)

=== 4 × 100 metre freestyle relay ===
- 1915 – Stockholms KK
- 1916 – Malmö S
- 1917 – Malmö S
- 1918 – Malmö S
- 1919 – Malmö S
- 1920 – Stockholms KK
- 1921 – Malmö S
- 1922 – Malmö S
- 1923 – Stockholms KK
- 1924 – Stockholms KK
- 1925 – Stockholms KK
- 1926 – Malmö S
- 1927 – Stockholms KK
- 1928 – Stockholms KK
- 1929 – Stockholms KK
- 1930 – SoIK Hellas
- 1931 – SK Neptun
- 1932 – SK Neptun
- 1933 – SK Neptun
- 1934 – SK Neptun
- 1935 – SK Neptun
- 1936 – SK Neptun
- 1937 – SoIK Hellas
- 1938 – Stockholms KK
- 1939 – SoIK Hellas
- 1940 – Stockholms KK
- 1941 – SoIK Hellas
- 1942 – SoIK Hellas
- 1943 – SoIK Hellas
- 1944 – SK Neptun
- 1945 – SK Neptun
- 1946 – SoIK Hellas
- 1947 – SoIK Hellas
- 1948 – SK Neptun
- 1949 – SoIK Hellas
- 1950 – IF Elfsborg
- 1967 – SK Neptun
- 1968 – SK Neptun
- 1969 – Stockholmspolisens IF (Bo Westergren, Per-Arne Blomqvist, Leif Björklund & Jan Lundin)
- 1970 – Stockholmspolisens IF
- 1971 – Timrå AIF
- 1972 – Timrå AIF
- 1973 – Simavdelningen 1902
- 1974 – Simavdelningen 1902
- 1975 – Simavdelningen 1902
- 1976 – Simavdelningen 1902
- 1977 – Kristianstads SLS
- 1978 – Kristianstads SLS
- 1979 – Borlänge SS
- 1980 – Borlänge SS
- 1981 – Borlänge SS
- 1982 – Borlänge SS
- 1983 – Borlänge SS
- 1984 – Upsala S
- 1985 – Karlskrona SS (Christer Kågström, Tommy Werner, Michael Söderlund & Jonas Fredriksson)
- 1986 – Borlänge SS
- 1987 – Upsala S
- 1988 – Borlänge SS (Magnus Eriksson, Per Johansson, Jan Karlsson & Pär Helgesson)
- 1989 – Upsala S
- 1990 – Karlskrona SS
- 1991 – Karlskrona SS (Håkan Karlsson, Michael Söderlund, Tommy Werner & Göran Titus)
- 1992 – Södertälje SS (Marcus Lundstedt, Patric Robertsson, Peter Haraldsson & Jonas Åkesson)
- 1993 – Södertälje SS (Marcus Lundstedt, Patric Robertsson, Peter Haraldsson & Jonas Åkesson)
- 1994 – Upsala S
- 1995 – Borlänge SS
- 1996 – Upsala S
- 1997 – Sundsvalls SS (Johan Nyström, Lars Frölander, Niclas Öhman & Jonas Lundström)
- 1998 – Sundsvalls SS (Johan Nyström, Mikael E. Rosén, Niclas Öhman & Lars Frölander)
- 1999 – SK Neptun (Dan Cornelius, Anders Forsberg, Johan Wallberg & Marcus Fahlén)
- 2000 – Sundsvalls SS (Johan Nyström, Lars Frölander, Daniel Lönnberg & Johan Backlund)
- 2001 – Trelleborgs SS (Jonas Tilly, Marcus Borg, Martin Latz & Mattias Ohlin)
- 2002 – Linköpings ASS (Marcus Piehl, Lars Frölander, Erik Dorch & Rickard Piehl)
- 2003 – Malmö KK (Eric la Fleur, Jonas Persson, Marcus Andersson & Max von Bodungen)
- 2004 – Linköpings ASS (Marcus Piehl, Lars Frölander, Hans Albrektsson & Rickard Piehl)
- 2005 – Linköpings ASS (Marcus Piehl, Lars Frölander, Erik Dorch & Hans Albrektsson)
- 2006 – Linköpings ASS (Marcus Piehl, Lars Frölander, Kristofer Johansson & Hans Albrektsson)
- 2007 – SK Neptun (Stefan Nystrand, Petter Stymne, Axel Pettersson & Pontus Flodqvist)
- 2008 – SK Neptun (Pontus Flodqvist, Petter Stymne, Simon Sjödin & Stefan Nystrand)
- 2009 – Linköpings ASS (Lars Frölander, Erik Andersson, Marcus Piehl & Jonas Riffer)
- 2010 – SK Neptun (Pontus Flodqvist, Petter Stymne, Simon Sjödin & Stefan Nystrand)
- 2011 – SK Neptun (Pontus Flodqvist, Petter Stymne, Simon Sjödin & Paul Gordon)
- 2012 – SK Neptun (Christoffer Vikström, Petter Stymne, Simon Sjödin & Alexander Nyström)
- 2013 – SK Neptun (Christoffer Vikström, Jacob Thulin, Simon Sjödin & Alexander Nyström)
- 2014 – Linköpings ASS (Oscar Ekström, Alexander Linge, Anton Andersson & Lars Frölander)
- 2015 – Linköpings ASS (Alexander Linge, Lars Frölander, Pontus Palmqvist & Oscar Ekström)
- 2016 – Helsingborgs S (Christoffer Carlsen, Isak Eliasson, Jonas Holmström & Jesper Björk)
- 2017 – Helsingborgs S (Isak Eliasson, Jonas Holmström, Jacob Zeidler & Christoffer Carlsen)
- 2018 – Jönköpings SS (Daniel Forndal, Albin Lövgren, Axel Pettersson & Filip Grimberg)
- 2019 – Helsingborgs S (Jonas Holmström, Jesper Björk, Daniel Kertes & Christoffer Carlsen)
- 2021 – SK Neptun (Olle Sköld, Gustav Hökfelt, William Lulek & Simon Sjödin)
- 2022 – Spårvägens SF (Robin Hanson, Isak Eliasson, Jonathan Kling & Rasmus Hanson)

=== 4 × 200 metre freestyle relay ===
- 1951 – IF Elfsborg
- 1952 – IF Elfsborg
- 1953 – IF Elfsborg
- 1954 – SK Poseidon
- 1955 – SK Neptun
- 1956 – Simavdelningen 1902
- 1957 – SK Neptun
- 1958 – SK Neptun (Per-Olof Ericsson, Leif Wolmsten, Bengt Nordvall & Per-Ola Lindberg)
- 1959 – SK Neptun (Per-Olof Ericsson, Lars-Erik Bengtsson, Leif Wolmsten & Bengt Nordvall)
- 1960 – SK Neptun (Bengt Nordvall, Per-Olof Ericsson, Lars-Erik Bengtsson & Per-Ola Lindberg)
- 1961 – SK Neptun (Per-Olof Ericsson, Leif Wolmsten, Per-Ola Lindberg & Lars-Erik Bengtsson)
- 1962 – SK Neptun (Bengt Nordvall, Leif Wolmsten, Lars-Erik Bengtsson & Per-Ola Lindberg)
- 1963 – SK Neptun (Per-Olof Ericsson, Bengt Nordvall, Lars-Erik Bengtsson & Per-Ola Lindberg)
- 1964 – SK Neptun
- 1965 – SK Neptun
- 1966 – Stockholmspolisens IF
- 1967 – SK Neptun
- 1968 – SK Neptun
- 1969 – Stockholms KK (Anders Holme, Torbjörn Clason, Lars Engström & Sven von Holst)
- 1970 – Simavdelningen 1902
- 1971 – Upsala S
- 1972 – Timrå AIF
- 1973 – Simavdelningen 1902
- 1974 – Simavdelningen 1902
- 1975 – Simavdelningen 1902
- 1976 – Simavdelningen 1902
- 1977 – Kristianstads SLS
- 1978 – Kristianstads SLS
- 1979 – Upsala S
- 1980 – Västerås SS
- 1981 – Västerås SS
- 1982 – Västerås SS
- 1983 – Kristianstads SLS
- 1984 – Kristianstads SLS
- 1985 – Karlskrona SS (Tommy Werner, Michael Söderlund, Christer Kågström & Jonas Fredriksson)
- 1986 – Upsala S
- 1987 – Malmö KK
- 1988 – Malmö KK
- 1989 – Malmö KK
- 1990 – SK Neptun
- 1991 – Karlskrona SS (Håkan Karlsson, Michael Söderlund, Göran Titus & Tommy Werner)
- 1992 – Karlskrona SS
- 1993 – Spårvägens SF
- 1994 – Spårvägens SF
- 1995 – Spårvägens SF
- 1996 – Spårvägens SF
- 1997 – Sundsvalls SS (Lars Frölander, Jonas Lundström, Mikael E. Rosén & Tobias Marklund)
- 1998 – Sundsvalls SS (Mikael E. Rosén, Johan Nyström, Lars Frölander & Jonas Lundström)
- 1999 – Malmö KK (Patrik Svensson, Max von Bodungen, Fredrik Engdahl & Martin Gustavsson)
- 2000 – SK Neptun (Tero Välimaa, Peter Edvardsson, Dan Cornelius & Johan Wallberg)
- 2001 – SK Neptun (Peter Edvardsson, Fredrik Seidevall, Tero Välimaa & Johan Wallberg)
- 2002 – Malmö KK (Jonas Persson, Marcus Andersson, Hannes Kohnke & Martin Gustavsson)
- 2003 – SK Neptun (Jonatan Dahlberg, Tero Välimaa, Peter Edvardsson & Petter Stymne)
- 2004 – SK Neptun (Jonatan Dahlberg, Axel Pettersson, Petter Stymne & Peter Edvardsson)
- 2005 – Malmö KK (Marcus Andersson, Jonas Persson, Martin Gustavsson & Tobias Lindbom)
- 2006 – Malmö KK (Marcus Andersson, Jonas Persson, Martin Gustavsson & Tobias Lindbom)
- 2007 – Malmö KK (Tobias Lindbom, Jonas Persson, Sten-Olof Gustafsson & Martin Persson)
- 2008 – Malmö KK (Jonas Persson, Andrew Thirwell, Sten-Olof Gustafsson & Niklas Persson)
- 2009 – Helsingborgs S (Gustav Åberg Lejdström, Henrik Sjöholm, Christoffer Wallin & Richard Vagerstam)
- 2010 – Uddevalla Sim (Fredrich Risebrandt, Mattias Carlsson, David Larsson & Jesper Svensson)
- 2011 – SK Neptun (Theo Zätterström, Simon Sjödin, Petter Stymne & Paul Gordon)
- 2012 – SK Neptun (Theo Zätterström, Simon Sjödin, Christoffer Vikström & Simon Frank)
- 2013 – Helsingborgs S (Gustav Åberg Lejdström, Oskar Nordstrand, Robbin Steén & Kristian Kron)
- 2014 – Mölndals ASS (Isak Eliasson, Patrik Löfgren, Christoffer Carlsen & Robin Andréasson)
- 2015 – Mölndals ASS (Christoffer Carlsen, Isak Eliasson, Filip Holmqvist & Robin Andréasson)
- 2016 – Helsingborgs S (Kristian Kron, Jonas Holmström, Christoffer Carlsen & Isak Eliasson)
- 2017 – Helsingborgs S (Isak Eliasson, Jonas Holmström, Christoffer Carlsen & Jesper Björk)
- 2018 – Jönköpings SS (Albin Lövgren, Filip Grimberg, Daniel Forndal & Victor Johansson)
- 2019 – SK Neptun (Wiggo Frohde, Kristian Kron, Simon Sjödin & Olle Sköld)
- 2021 – Spårvägens SF (Adam Karlsson, Isak Eliasson, Gustav Henriksen & Robin Hanson)
- 2022 – Spårvägens SF (Rasmus Hanson, Robin Hanson, Gustav Henriksen & Isak Eliasson)

=== 4 × 100 metre medley relay ===
- 1949 – Stockholms KK
- 1950 – Stockholms KK
- 1951 – Stockholms KK
- 1952 – Stockholms KK
- 1953 – Stockholms KK
- 1954 – SK Poseidon
- 1955 – SK Neptun
- 1956 – Simavdelningen 1902
- 1957 – Simavdelningen 1902
- 1958 – SoIK Hellas (Lars Eriksson, Lennart Fröstad, Bo Larsson & Per-Olof Östrand)
- 1959 – Malmö S (Lars Eriksson, Junot Delcomyn, Jan Olof Larsson & Björn Billquist)
- 1960 – Stockholmspolisens IF (Jan Lundin, Tommie Lindström, Håkan Bengtsson & Bert Svensson)
- 1961 – Stockholmspolisens IF (Jan Lundin, Tommie Lindström, Håkan Bengtsson & Bert Svensson)
- 1962 – SK Neptun (Per-Olof Ericsson, Rolf Junefelt, Lars-Erik Bengtsson & Per-Ola Lindberg)
- 1963 – Stockholmspolisens IF (Torsten Born, Tommie Lindström, Håkan Bengtsson & Jan Lundin)
- 1964 – SK Neptun
- 1965 – Sundsvalls SS
- 1966 – Stockholmspolisens IF
- 1967 – Stockholmspolisens IF
- 1968 – Sundsvalls SS
- 1969 – Simavdelningen 1902 (Jan Gustafson, Björn Wahlgren, Tommy Palstam & Glen Bengtsson)
- 1970 – Sundsvalls SS
- 1971 – Timrå AIF
- 1972 – Simavdelningen 1902
- 1973 – Karlskoga SS
- 1974 – Spårvägens GoIF
- 1975 – Simavdelningen 1902
- 1976 – Stockholmspolisens IF
- 1977 – Stockholmspolisens IF
- 1978 – Stockholmspolisens IF
- 1979 – Kristianstads SLS
- 1980 – Stockholmspolisens IF (Jan Thorell, Anders Norling, Sten Williamsson & Per Holmertz)
- 1981 – Stockholmspolisens IF
- 1982 – SK Korrugal (Bengt Baron, Tommy Pettersson, Pär Arvidsson & Anders Nordström)
- 1983 – SK Korrugal (Bengt Baron, Tommy Pettersson, Pär Arvidsson & Anders Nordström)
- 1984 – SK Korrugal (Bengt Baron, Tommy Pettersson, Pär Arvidsson & Anders Nordström)
- 1985 – SK Korrugal (Bengt Baron, Tommy Pettersson, Pär Arvidsson & Harald Krüger)
- 1986 – Stockholmspolisens IF
- 1987 – Helsingborgs S (Nils Liedberg, Ola Lundblad, Anders Rasmusson & Viktor Olsson)
- 1988 – Malmö KK
- 1989 – Stockholmspolisens IF
- 1990 – Stockholmspolisens IF
- 1991 – Karlskrona SS (Håkan Karlsson, Ulf Gladher, Göran Titus & Tommy Werner)
- 1992 – Karlskrona SS
- 1993 – Spårvägens SF
- 1994 – Spårvägens SF
- 1995 – Spårvägens SF
- 1996 – Ängelholms SS
- 1997 – Sundsvalls SS (Tobias Marklund, Jens Johansson, Lars Frölander & Niclas Öhman)
- 1998 – SK Neptun (Stefano Prestinoni, Ilia Mikhailov, Johan Setterberg & Johan Wallberg)
- 1999 – Trelleborgs SS (Mattias Ohlin, Christian Clausen, Dan Lindström & Jonas Tilly)
- 2000 – Sundsvalls SS (Daniel Lönnberg, Jens Johansson, Lars Frölander & Johan Nyström)
- 2001 – Sundsvalls SS (Daniel Lönnberg, Jens Johansson, Lars Frölander & Johan Backlund)
- 2002 – Malmö KK (Fredrik Engdahl, Martin Gustavsson, Andreas Lentonsson & Eric la Fleur)
- 2003 – Malmö KK (Eric la Fleur, Martin Gustavsson, Patrik Johansson & Jonas Persson)
- 2004 – Malmö KK (Eric la Fleur, Martin Gustavsson, Andreas Lentonsson & Jonas Persson)
- 2005 – Malmö KK (Sten-Olof Gustafsson, Martin Gustavsson, Joakim Dahl & Jonas Persson)
- 2006 – Malmö KK (Sten-Olof Gustafsson, Martin Gustavsson, Marcus Andersson & Jonas Persson)
- 2007 – SK Neptun (Petter Stymne, Jonas Andersson, Axel Pettersson & Stefan Nystrand)
- 2008 – Malmö KK (Sten-Olof Gustafsson, Martin Gustavsson, Andrew Thirwell & Jonas Persson)
- 2009 – SK Neptun (Simon Sjödin, Niklas Tour, Stefan Nystrand & Petter Stymne)
- 2010 – SK Neptun (Simon Sjödin, Niklas Tour, Alexander Nyström & Stefan Nystrand)
- 2011 – SK Neptun (Simon Sjödin, Niklas Tour, Paul Gordon & Petter Stymne)
- 2012 – SK Neptun (Simon Frank, Niklas Tour, Alexander Nyström & Petter Stymne)
- 2013 – SK Neptun (Simon Sjödin, Niklas Tour, Jacob Thulin & Christoffer Vikström)
- 2014 – SK Neptun (Simon Sjödin, Niklas Tour, Alexander Nyström & Petter Stymne)
- 2015 – Uddevalla Sim (Mattias Carlsson, Gulliver Koch, Jesper Jonsson & Anton Arvidsson)
- 2016 – SK Neptun (Gustav Hökfelt, Niklas Tour, Simon Sjödin & Alexander Nyström)
- 2017 – Helsingborgs S (Jesper Björk, Erik Kähr, Christoffer Carlsen & Isak Eliasson)
- 2018 – SK Neptun (Gustav Hökfelt, Johannes Skagius, Simon Sjödin & William Lulek)
- 2019 – SK Neptun (Gustav Hökfelt, Johannes Skagius, Simon Sjödin & Olle Sköld)
- 2021 – SK Neptun (Gustav Hökfelt, Patric Ridell, Simon Sjödin & Olle Sköld)
- 2022 – SK Neptun (Simon Sjödin, Johannes Skagius, Jesper Jonsson & Olle Sköld)

== Discontinued events ==
=== 500 metre freestyle ===
- 1906 – Robert Andersson (Stockholms KK)
- 1907 – Robert Andersson (Stockholms KK)
- 1908 – Robert Andersson (Stockholms KK)
- 1909 – Vilhelm Andersson (SK Neptun)
- 1910 – Vilhelm Andersson (SK Neptun)
- 1911 – Robert Andersson (Stockholms KK)
- 1912 – Vilhelm Andersson (SK Neptun)
- 1913 – Vilhelm Andersson (SK Neptun)
- 1914 – Robert Andersson (Stockholms KK)
- 1915 – Vilhelm Andersson (SK Neptun)
- 1916 – Hedly Norell (Stockholms KK)
- 1917 – Thor Henning (SK Neptun)
- 1918 – Frans Möller (Malmö S)
- 1919 – Arne Borg (Stockholms KK)
- 1920 – Arne Borg (Stockholms KK)
- 1921 – Arne Borg (Stockholms KK)
- 1922 – Arne Borg (Stockholms KK)
- 1923 – Arne Borg (Stockholms KK)
- 1924 – Arne Borg (Stockholms KK)
- 1925 – Åke Borg (Stockholms KK)
- 1926 – Hilding Björck (SK Neptun)
- 1927 – Arne Borg (Stockholms KK)
- 1928 – Arne Borg (Stockholms KK)
- 1929 – Aulo Gustavsson (Stockholms KK)

=== 1000 metre freestyle ===
- 1898 – Carl Hallberg (Stockholms KK)
- 1899 – John G. Andersson (Stockholms KK)
- 1900 – Erik Eriksson (Stockholms KK)
- 1901 – Erik Eriksson (Stockholms KK)
- 1902 – Erik Eriksson (Stockholms KK)
- 1903 – Charles Norelius (Stockholms KK)
- 1904 – Charles Norelius (Stockholms KK)
- 1905 – Charles Norelius (Stockholms KK)
- 1906 – Gunnar Wennerström (Stockholms KK)
- 1907 – Robert Andersson (Stockholms KK)
- 1908 – Robert Andersson (Stockholms KK)
- 1909 – Robert Andersson (Stockholms KK)
- 1910 – Vilhelm Andersson (SK Neptun)
- 1911 – Vilhelm Andersson (SK Neptun)
- 1912 – Vilhelm Andersson (SK Neptun)
- 1913 – Vilhelm Andersson (SK Neptun)

=== 1 mile freestyle ===
- 1906 – Robert Andersson (Stockholms KK)
- 1907 – Robert Andersson (Stockholms KK)
- 1908 – Robert Andersson (Stockholms KK)
- 1909 – Vilhelm Andersson (SK Neptun)
- 1910 – Vilhelm Andersson (SK Neptun)
- 1911 – Vilhelm Andersson (SK Neptun)
- 1912 – Vilhelm Andersson (SK Neptun)
- 1913 – Vilhelm Andersson (SK Neptun)

=== 5000 metre freesyle ===
- 1915 – Robert Andersson (Stockholms KK)
- 1917 – Robert Andersson (Stockholms KK)
- 1918 – Vilhelm Andersson (SK Neptun)
- 1919 – Alfred Ström (Eskilstuna SS)
- 1920 – John Adrian (Motala SS)
- 1921 – Erik Andersson (Simavdelningen 1902)
- 1922 – Erik Andersson (Simavdelningen 1902)
- 1923 – Åke Borg (Stockholms KK)
- 1924 – Åke Borg (Stockholms KK)
- 1925 – Åke Borg (Stockholms KK)
- 1926 – Hilding Björck (SK Neptun)
- 1927 – Sven Asp (IK Sirius)
- 1928 – Sven Asp (IK Sirius)
- 1929 – Sven Asp (IK Sirius)
- 1930 – Georg Svensson (SoIK Hellas)
- 1931 – Georg Svensson (SoIK Hellas)
- 1932 – Nils Blomstervall (Simavdelningen 1902)
- 1933 – Sixten Tuhlin (IF Elfsborg)
- 1934 – Gunnar Lindberg (IK Sirius)
- 1935 – Roland Johansson (Norrköpings KK)
- 1936 – Nils Blomstervall (IF Elfsborg)
- 1937 – Nils Blomstervall (Simavdelningen 1902)
- 1938 – Åke Julin (Stockholms KK)
- 1939 – Lars Sixtfors (Stockholms KK)
- 1940 – Björn Borg (Norrköpings KK)
- 1941 – Åke Julin (Stockholms KK)
- 1942 – Göte Johansson (Jönköpings SLS)
- 1943 – Torbjörn Jansson (Upsala S)
- 1944 – Torbjörn Jansson (Upsala S)

=== 250 metre breaststroke ===
- 1906 – Pontus Hansson (Stockholms KK)
- 1907 – Pontus Hansson (Stockholms KK)
- 1908 – Pontus Hansson (Stockholms KK)
- 1909 – Robert Andersson (Stockholms KK)
- 1910 – Harald Julin (Stockholms KK)
- 1911 – Thor Henning (SK Neptun)
- 1912 – Thor Henning (SK Neptun)
- 1913 – Thor Henning (SK Neptun)

=== 400 metre breaststroke ===
- 1914 – Thor Henning (SK Neptun)
- 1915 – Thor Henning (SK Neptun)
- 1916 – Thor Henning (SK Neptun)
- 1917 – Thor Henning (SK Neptun)
- 1918 – Håkan Malmrot (Örebro SS)
- 1919 – Håkan Malmrot (Örebro SS)
- 1920 – Thor Henning (SK Neptun)
- 1921 – Thor Henning (SK Neptun)
- 1922 – Håkan Malmrot (Örebro SS)
- 1923 – Erik Andersson (Simavdelningen 1902)
- 1924 – Bengt Linders (Stockholms KK)
- 1925 – Bengt Linders (Stockholms KK)
- 1926 – Bengt Linders (Stockholms KK)
- 1927 – Erik Harling (Stockholms KK)
- 1928 – Erik Harling (Stockholms KK)
- 1929 – Erik Harling (Stockholms KK)
- 1930 – Erik Harling (Stockholms KK)
- 1931 – Sigfrid Heyner (Stockholms KK)
- 1932 – Erik Harling (Stockholms KK)
- 1933 – Sigfrid Heyner (Stockholms KK)
- 1934 – Sigfrid Heyner (Stockholms KK)
- 1935 – Vilgot Johansson (Kalmar SS)
- 1936 – Vilgot Johansson (Kalmar SS)
- 1937 – John Rothman (Stockholms KK)
- 1938 – John Rothman (Stockholms KK)
- 1939 – John Rothman (Stockholms KK)
- 1940 – John Rothman (Stockholms KK)
- 1941 – Gunnar Sulling (SoIK Hellas)
- 1942 – John Rothman (Stockholms KK)
- 1943 – Rune Hellgren (SoIK Hellas)
- 1944 – John Rothman (Stockholms KK)
- 1945 – Rune Hellgren (SoIK Hellas)
- 1946 – John Rothman (Stockholms KK)
- 1947 – John Rothman (Stockholms KK)
- 1964 – Per-Olof Fulke (Katrineholms SS)
- 1965 – Torgny Rasmuson (Upsala S)
- 1966 – Thomas Johnsson (Skövde SS)

=== 3 × 100 metre medley relay ===
- 1945 – SoIK Hellas
- 1946 – SoIK Hellas
- 1947 – SK Neptun
- 1948 – SK Neptun

=== Lifesaving ===
- 1906 – Wilhelm Persson (Stockholms KK)
- 1907 – Pontus Hansson (Stockholms KK)
- 1908 – Pontus Hansson (Stockholms KK)
- 1909 – Robert Andersson (Stockholms KK)
- 1910 – Harald Julin (Stockholms KK)
- 1911 – Erik Bergqvist (Stockholms KK)
- 1912 – Erik Bergqvist (Stockholms KK)
- 1913 – Thor Henning (SK Neptun)
- 1915 – Thor Henning (SK Neptun)
- 1916 – Thor Henning (SK Neptun)
- 1917 – Cletus Andersson (SK Neptun)
- 1918 – Cletus Andersson (SK Neptun)
- 1919 – Thor Henning (SK Neptun)
- 1920 – Cletus Andersson (SK Neptun)
- 1921 – Thor Henning (SK Neptun)
- 1922 – Henning Lundqvist (Västerås SS)
- 1923 – Gösta Persson (Stockholms KK)
- 1924 – Per Cederblom (Simavdelningen 1902)
- 1925 – Gösta Persson (Stockholms KK)
- 1926 – Ture Ancher (Simavdelningen 1902)
- 1927 – Tage Wissnell (SoIK Hellas)
- 1928 – Tage Wissnell (SoIK Hellas)
- 1929 – Göte Andersson (Stockholms KK)
- 1930 – Gösta Robach (SK Neptun)
- 1931 – Bertil Svensson (Stockholms KK)
- 1932 – Gösta Robach (SK Neptun)
- 1933 – Göte Andersson (Stockholms KK)
- 1934 – Göte Andersson (Stockholms KK)
- 1935 – Göte Andersson (Stockholms KK)
- 1936 – Rolf Julin (Stockholms KK)
- 1937 – Rolf Julin (Stockholms KK)
- 1938 – Göte Andersson (Stockholms KK)
- 1939 – Per-Olof Olsson (SoIK Hellas)
- 1940 – Rolf Julin (Stockholms KK)
- 1941 – K. Fransson (IF Elfsborg)
- 1942 – Thor Henning Jr. (SK Neptun)
- 1943 – Thor Henning Jr. (SK Neptun)
- 1944 – Per-Olof Olsson (SoIK Hellas)
- 1945 – Thor Henning Jr. (SK Neptun)
- 1946 – Per-Olof Olsson (SoIK Hellas)
- 1947 – Per-Olof Olsson (SoIK Hellas)
- 1948 – Per-Olof Olsson (SoIK Hellas)
- 1949 – Per-Olof Olsson (SoIK Hellas)
- 1950 – Stig Wetterskog (Göteborgs KK)
- 1951 – Stig Wetterskog (Göteborgs KK)
- 1952 – Per-Olof Olsson (SoIK Hellas)
- 1953 – Bengt Rask (Stockholms KK)
- 1954 – Bengt Rask (Stockholms KK)
- 1955 – Bengt Rask (Simavdelningen 1902)
- 1956 – Sven-Gunnar Karlsson (Simavdelningen 1902)
- 1957 – Rolf Junefelt (Jönköpings SLS)
- 1958 – Lennart Brock (SK Poseidon)
- 1959 – Lars Axelsson (SoIK Hellas)
- 1960 – Bernt Nilsson (Göteborgs KK)
- 1961 – Bernt Nilsson (Göteborgs KK)
- 1962 – Mats Claesson (Jönköpings SLS)
- 1963 – Mats Svensson (IF Elfsborg)
- 1964 – Lars Westergren (Stockholmspolisens IF)
- 1965 – Hans Ljungberg (SK Neptun)
- 1966 – Hans Ljungberg (Bromma SS)
- 1967 – Gunnar Larsson (Malmö S)
- 1968 – Marka Närhi (Eskilstuna SS)
