= Pierre Roger =

Pierre Roger may refer to:

- Pierre Roger, later Pope Clement VI
- Pierre Roger de Beaufort, later Pope Gregory XI
- Pierre Roger (swimmer) (born 1983), French swimmer
