= Norelius =

Norelius is a Swedish surname. Notable people with the surname include:

- Benkt Norelius (1886–1974), Swedish gymnast
- Charles Norelius (1882–1974), Swedish-American swimmer and coach
- Eric Norelius (1833–1916), Swedish-American Lutheran minister, church leader, and author
- Kristine Norelius (born 1956), American rower
- Martha Norelius (1911–1955), Swedish-born American swimmer, daughter of Charles
