= Åke Julin =

Swedish water polo player

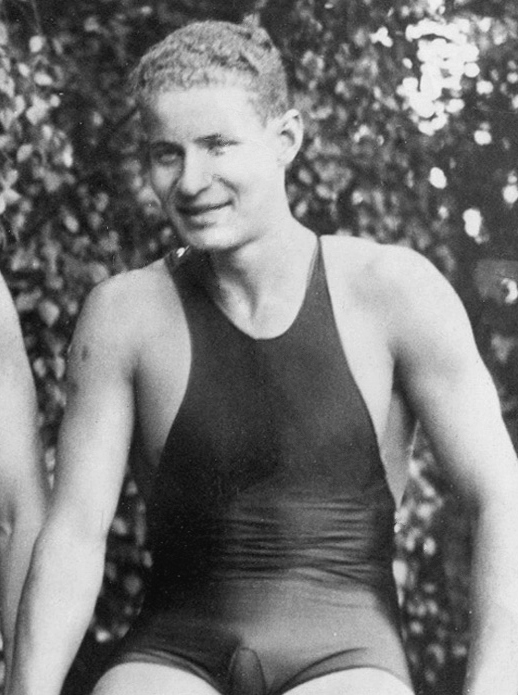

Personal information
- Full name: Åke Leif Julin
- Born: 13 October 1919 Stockholm, Sweden
- Died: 25 September 2008 (aged 88) Enebyberg, Sweden

Sport
- Sport: Water polo
- Club: Stockholms KK

Åke Leif Julin (13 October 1919 – 25 September 2008) was a Swedish water polo player and swimmer. He was part of Swedish teams that finished fifth and ninth at the 1948 and 1952 Summer Olympics, respectively.

At club level, Julin represented Stockholms KK. As a swimmer, he won the Swedish championship titles on 200 metre and 400 metre freestyle at the 1939 Swedish Swimming Championships, representing Stockholms KK.

His father Harald and elder brother Rolf were also Olympic water polo players.
