= Erik Harling =

Swedish swimmer

Personal information
- Nationality: Swedish
- Born: 11 May 1910 Stockholm, Sweden
- Died: 16 November 1978 (aged 68) Stockholm, Sweden

Sport
- Sport: Swimming
- Club: Stockholms KK

Knut Erik Morgan Harling (11 May 1910 – 16 November 1978) was a Swedish swimmer. He competed in the men's 200 metre breaststroke event at the 1928 Summer Olympics.

Harling represented Stockholms KK.
