= Sigfrid Heyner =

Swedish swimmer

Personal information
- Born: 20 July 1909 Stockholm, Sweden
- Died: 9 November 1995 (aged 86) Stockholm, Sweden

Sport
- Sport: Swimming
- Club: Stockholms KK

Sigfrid Heyner (20 July 1909 – 9 November 1995) was a Swedish swimmer. He competed in the men's 200 metre breaststroke at the 1932 Summer Olympics.

Heyner represented Stockholms KK.
