= Hans Ljungberg =

Swedish swimmer (1948–2020)

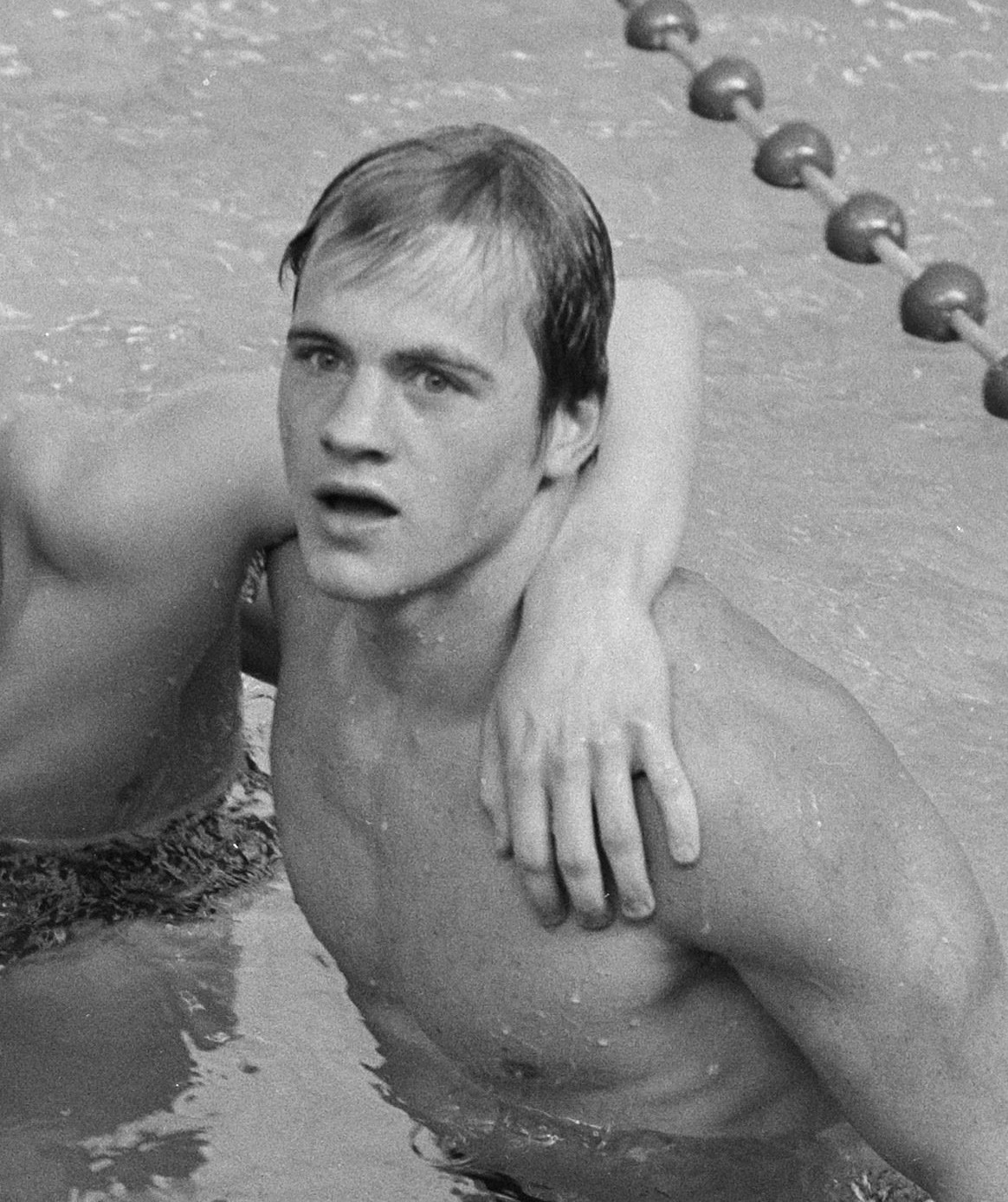
- Hans Ljungberg during competitions in Bussum, Netherlands in April 1970

Personal information
- Born: 26 March 1948 Stockholm, Sweden
- Died: 31 July 2020 (aged 72) Gränna, Sweden
- Height: 1.75 m (5 ft 9 in)
- Weight: 75 kg (165 lb)

Sport
- Sport: Swimming
- Club: Bromma SS, Stockholm and Timrå AIF, Timrå
Medal record
Representing Sweden
European Championships
Bronze medal – third place	1970 Barcelona	200 m medley

Hans Bertil Ljungberg (26 March 1948 – 31 July 2020) was a Swedish swimmer who won a bronze medal at the 1970 European Aquatics Championships. He competed at the 1968 and 1972 Summer Olympics in eight freestyle, medley and backstroke events; his best achievement was the fourth place in the 4 × 200 m freestyle relay in 1972.

In the 1960s he studied at the California State University, Long Beach. In the 2000s, he was still competing in the masters category.
