= Georg Svensson =

Swedish water polo player

Personal information
- Born: August 23, 1908; Stockholm, Sweden
- Died: August 15, 1970 (aged 61); Stockholm, Sweden

Sport
- Sport: Water polo

Georg Svensson, also known as Georg Sollermark (August 23, 1908 – August 15, 1970) was a Swedish water polo player who competed in the 1936 Summer Olympics. In 1936 he was part of the Swedish team which finished seventh in the water polo tournament. He played six matches.
