= Olle Ferm =

Swedish swimmer (born 1947)

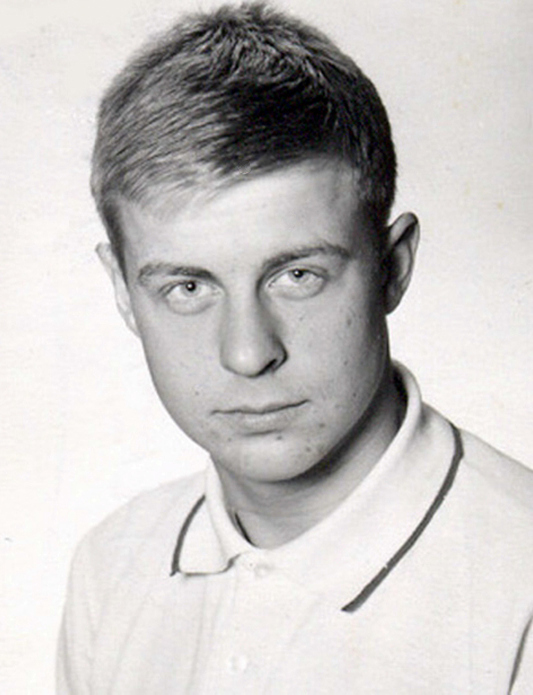

Personal information
- Born: 8 March 1947 Norrköping, Sweden
- Height: 1.82 m (6 ft 0 in)
- Weight: 72 kg (159 lb)

Sport
- Sport: Swimming
- Club: Norrköpings KK
Medal record
Representing Sweden
European Championships
Bronze medal – third place	1966 Utrecht	4×200 m freestyle

Sven Olof Erik "Olle" Ferm (born 8 March 1947) is a retired Swedish swimmer who won a bronze medal in the 4 × 200 m freestyle relay at the 1966 European Aquatics Championships. He competed at the 1964 and 1968 Summer Olympics in the 4 × 200 m relay and three individual medley events with the best achievement of eighth place in the relay in 1968.
