= Bernt Zarnowiecki =

Swedish swimmer

Personal information
- Born: 26 May 1954 Gothenburg, Sweden
- Height: 1.76 m (5 ft 9 in)
- Weight: 68 kg (150 lb)

Sport
- Sport: Swimming
- Club: Simklubben S02, Göteborg
Medal record
Men's swimming
Representing Sweden
European Championships
| Bronze medal – third place | 1974 Vienna | 4×200 m freestyle |

Bernt Lennart Zarnowiecki (born 26 May 1954) is a Swedish swimmer, international competitor and 1972 Munich Olympic participant in the freestyle relay.

Zarnowiecki was born 26 May 1954 in Gothenburg, Sweden. He swam for the Simklubben S02 club, in his hometown of Gothenburg.

Zarnowiecki won a bronze medal in the 4 × 200 m freestyle relay at the 1974 European Aquatics Championships.

== 1972 Munich Olympics ==
Competing in the 200 metres individual freestyle relay event at the 1972 Summer Olympics in Munich, he was eliminated in the preliminaries. Zarnowiecki placed 34th in the 200 with a time of 2:01.34.

Being Jewish, he competed at the 1973 Maccabiah Games in Israel, and won three gold medals, including in the men's 400 m freestyle and the 1,500 m freestyle.

His twin sister, Anita Zarnowiecki, also competed in freestyle swimming at the 1972 Summer Olympics and the ninth Maccabiah Games.
