= Tommie Lindström =

Swedish swimmer (1938–2020)

Personal information
- Full name: Sven Tommie Lindström
- Born: 1 March 1938 Stockholm, Sweden
- Died: 21 December 2020 (aged 82)

Sport
- Sport: Swimming
- Club: Stockholmspolisens IF

Sven Tommie Lindström (1 March 1938 – 21 December 2020) was a Swedish swimmer. He competed in the men's 200 metre breaststroke at the 1960 Summer Olympics.

Lindström represented Stockholmspolisens IF.
