= Anders Peterson =

Swedish swimmer

Personal information
- Born: April 9, 1965 (age 61) Halmstad, Halland

Sport
- Sport: Swimming
- Strokes: Medley

Anders Kent Peter Peterson (born April 9, 1965) is a former Swedish swimmer. He participated at the 1984 Summer Olympics, competing in individual medley events. He finished 9th in the 400 m individual medley and 20th in the 200 m individual medley.

== Clubs ==
- Mariestads SS
