= Norrköpings KK =

Swedish swim team

Club information
- Full name: Norrköpings Kappsimningsklubb
- Short name: NKK
- City: Norrköping
- Founded: 7 September 1919; 105 years ago
- Home pool(s): Centralbadet

Norrköpings Kappsimningsklubb, commonly known as Norrköpings KK or NKK, is a Swedish swimming club from Norrköping, founded 7 September 1919. Norrköpings KK resides in Centralbadet, Råsslabadet, Ringdansen, and Himmelstalundsbadet. Its best-known swimmers are the Svenska Dagbladet Gold Medal winner Björn Borg and Olympic silver medallist Tina Gustafsson.

== Swimmers ==
Swimmers that have participated in the Summer Olympics while representing Norrköpings KK:

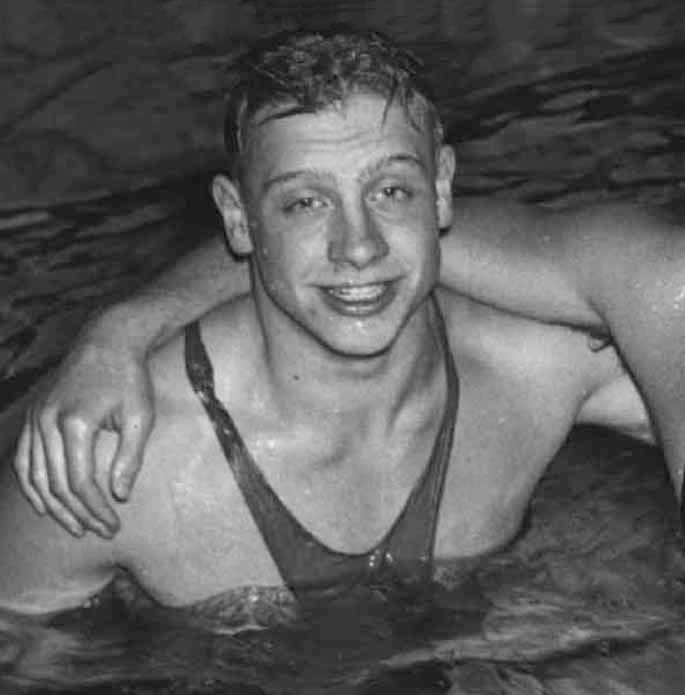
Norrköpings KK swimmer Björn Borg

- Björn Borg
- Olle Ferm
- Tina Gustafsson
- Roland Johansson
- Ellenor Svensson
