= Anders Sandberg (swimmer) =

Swedish swimmer

Personal information
- Born: 27 July 1953 (age 72) Eskilstuna, Sweden

Sport
- Sport: Swimming

Anders Sandberg (born 27 July 1953) is a Swedish former backstroke swimmer. He competed in three events at the 1972 Summer Olympics.
