= Pär Lindström =

Swedish swimmer

Personal information
- Born: October 29, 1970 (age 55) Linköping, Östergötland

Sport
- Sport: Swimming

Pär Arne Lindström (born 29 October 1970) is a former freestyle swimmer from Sweden. He competed twice at the Summer Olympics for his native country, in 1992 and 1996, both in the Men's 50m Freestyle. He later was affiliated with the University of California, Berkeley and would earn an MBA from Harvard Business School.

== Clubs ==
- Katrineholms Simsällskap
