= Sundsvalls SS =

Swedish swimming club

Club information
- Full name: Sundsvalls Simsällskap
- City: Sundsvall
- Founded: 1871; 155 years ago
- Home pool: Himlabadet

Sundsvalls Simsällskap, commonly known as Sundsvalls SS or SSS, is a Swedish swimming club from Sundsvall, founded in 1871. From 1971, Sundsvalls SS was residing in Sporthallsbadet, but are since 2018 located in Himlabadet.

The team's most famous swimmers are Olympic gold medalist for 100 metre butterfly Lars Frölander and Olympic bronze medalist Anna-Karin Kammerling.

== History ==
Sundsvalls SS swimmers were swimming in Selångersån until 1908, when the first swimming bath was built.

Sundsvalls SS had their first Olympic swimmer at the 1964 Summer Olympics, when Ingvar Eriksson participated.

At the 2000 Summer Olympics, Sundsvalls SS swimmer Lars Frölander became the Olympic champion in 100 metre butterfly.

== Swimmers ==
Swimmers that have participated in the Summer Olympics while representing Sundsvalls SS:

- Ingvar Eriksson
- Lars Frölander
- Anna-Karin Kammerling
- Dan Larsson
- Johan Nyström
- Linda Olofsson
- Hans Tegeback
- Hanna Westrin
