= Jan Lundin =

Swedish swimmer (1942–2023)

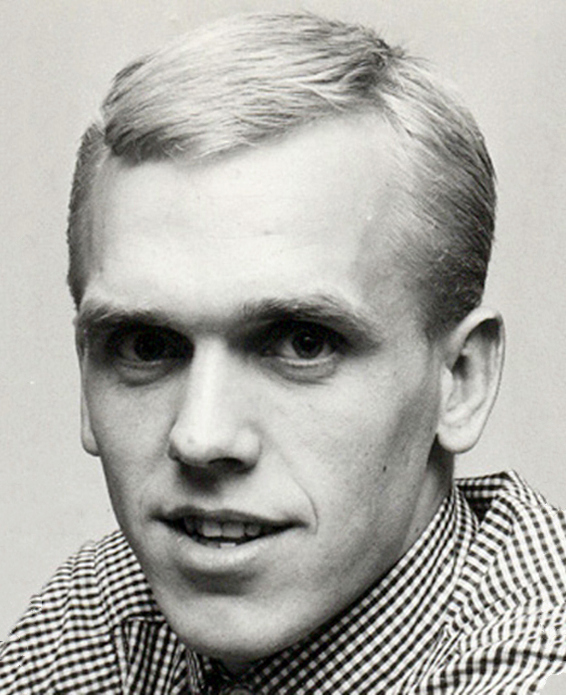

Personal information
- Born: 3 September 1942 Stockholm, Sweden
- Died: 10 May 2023 (aged 80) Åkersberga, Sweden
- Height: 1.80 m (5 ft 11 in)
- Weight: 70 kg (150 lb)

Sport
- Sport: Swimming
- Club: Stockholmspolisens IF, Stockholm
Medal record
Representing Sweden
European Championships
Bronze medal – third place	1962 Leipzig	4×100 m freestyle
Bronze medal – third place	1966 Utrecht	4×100 m freestyle
Bronze medal – third place	1966 Utrecht	4×200 m freestyle

Jan Ored Lundin (3 September 1942 – 10 May 2023) was a Swedish swimmer who won three bronze medals in the 4 × 100 m and 4 × 200 m freestyle relays at the 1962 and 1966 European Aquatics Championships. He finished fifth in both these events at the 1964 Summer Olympics. Lundin died in Åkersberga on 10 May 2023, at the age of 80.
