= Bengt Linders =

Swedish swimmer and lawyer (1904–1984)

Personal information
- Full name: Bengt Jakob Linders
- Born: 4 June 1904 Stockholm, Sweden
- Died: 25 December 1984 (aged 80) Helsingborg, Sweden

Sport
- Sport: Swimming
- Strokes: Breaststroke
- Club: Stockholms KK

Bengt Linders (4 June 1904 – 25 December 1984) was a Swedish swimmer and lawyer who finished fourth in the men's 200 metre breaststroke event at the 1924 Summer Olympics and the 1926 European Aquatics Championships. He won the Swedish championship in the 400 metre breaststroke in 1924, 1925 and 1926 and the 200 metre breaststroke in 1925, and set Swedish national records in the 100 metre and 200 metre breaststroke events.

== Career ==
Linders represented Stockholms KK at the club level.

At the 1924 Olympics he won his first-round heat in 3:03.4 and placed second in his semi-final in 3:01.4. In the final he finished fourth in 3:02.2. In August 1924 Linders won the 400 metre breaststroke in 6:30.6 at the Swedish championships in Gothenburg.

In March 1925 he set a Swedish record of 2:56.5 in the 200 metre breaststroke, breaking Thor Henning's five-year-old record of 2:58.4. At the Swedish championships held at Strömbadet in Stockholm in July and August 1925, he won the 200 metre breaststroke in 2:58.2 and the 400 metre breaststroke in 6:29.2. In October of the same year, at Centralbadet in Stockholm, he lowered his 200 metre breaststroke record by 2.9 seconds to 2:53.6, finishing ahead of Henning.

In March 1926 he set a Swedish record of 1:19.4 in the 100 metre breaststroke, breaking Henning's record of 1:20.8, which had stood since 1921. In July 1926 he won the 400 metre breaststroke at the Swedish championships for the third consecutive year. In August 1926 he participated in the European Aquatics Championships in Budapest, finishing fourth in the 200 metre breaststroke final.

== Personal life ==
Linders was the son of Jacob Linders, a district judge, and Selma Lindgren. He graduated in law in Stockholm in 1926, served as a district court clerk from 1927 to 1930, and practised as a lawyer in Helsingborg from 1930. From 1948, he owned the law firm of Henry Ljunggren. He sat on the board of the southern division of the Swedish Bar Association from 1952 to 1963, and on the association's national board from 1957 to 1963. He was made a Knight of the Order of Vasa. He married Karin Persson in 1932 and had two children.
