= Lester Eriksson =

Swedish swimmer (1942–2021)

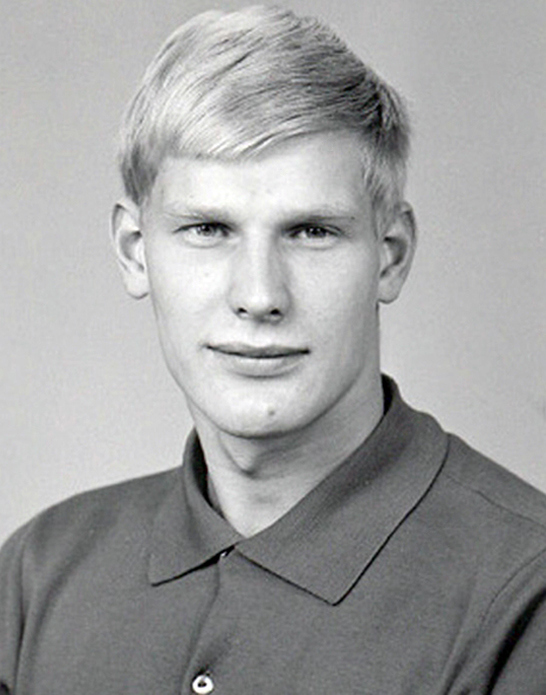
- Eriksson in the 1960s

Personal information
- Born: 16 November 1942 Stockholm, Sweden
- Died: 26 October 2021 (aged 78) Mogán, Las Palmas, Spain
- Height: 1.91 m (6 ft 3 in)
- Weight: 85 kg (187 lb)

Sport
- Sport: Swimming
- Club: SK Neptun
Medal record
Representing Sweden
European Championships
Bronze medal – third place	1966 Utrecht	4×100 m freestyle
Bronze medal – third place	1966 Utrecht	4×200 m freestyle

Erik Lester Eriksson (16 November 1942 – 26 October 2021) was a Swedish freestyle swimmer who won two bronze relay medals at the 1966 European Aquatics Championships. He competed at the 1964 and 1968 Summer Olympics in seven events with the best achievement of fifth-eighth place in the 4 × 200 m freestyle relay.
