= Pontus Renholm =

Swedish swimmer

Personal information
- Born: March 16, 1986 (age 40) Stockholm, Sweden

Sport
- Sport: Swimming
- Strokes: Backstroke
- Club: SMU Mustangs

Pontus Renholm (born 16 March 1986) is a Swedish backstroke swimmer representing Stockholmspolisens IF. He currently attends Southern Methodist University.

== Personal bests ==
=== Long course (50 m) ===
| Event | Time | | Date | Meet | Location | Ref |
|---|---|---|---|---|---|---|
| 50 m backstroke | 25.46 | NR | 16 Jul 2008 | Swedish Championships | Norrköping, Sweden | |
| 100 m backstroke | 55.67 | (sf) | 16 Jul 2008 | Swedish Championships | Norrköping, Sweden | |
| 200 m backstroke | 2:05.34 | | 29 Jun 2005 | Swedish Championships | Sundsvall, Sweden | |

Legend: WR – World record; ER – European record; NR – Swedish record;
Records not set in finals: h – heat; sf – semifinal; r – relay 1st leg; rh – relay heat 1st leg; b – B final; † – en route to final mark; so – swim-off; tt – time trial

=== Short course (25 m) ===
| Event | Time | | Date | Meet | Location | Ref |
|---|---|---|---|---|---|---|
| 50 m backstroke | 23.80 | NR (rh) | 10 Dec 2009 | European SC Championships | Istanbul, Turkey | |
| 100 m backstroke | 51.35 | NR (sf) | 12 Dec 2009 | European SC Championships | Istanbul, Turkey | |
| 200 m backstroke | 1:57.48 | | 11 Mar 2004 | Swedish SC Championships | Malmö, Sweden | |

Legend: WR – World record; ER – European record; NR – Swedish record;
Records not set in finals: h – heat; sf – semifinal; r – relay 1st leg; rh – relay heat 1st leg; b – B final; † – en route to final mark; so – swim-off; tt – time trial

== Clubs ==
- Stockholmspolisens IF
