= Thomas Johnsson =

Swedish swimmer

Personal information
- Born: 8 December 1949 (age 76) Skövde, Sweden

Sport
- Sport: Swimming

Thomas Johnsson (born 8 December 1949) is a Swedish former breaststroke swimmer. He competed in three events at the 1968 Summer Olympics.
