= Sven-Pelle Pettersson =

Swedish swimmer and water polo player

Personal information
- Born: 15 December 1911
- Died: 6 January 2000

Sport
- Country: Sweden
- Sport: swimming; water polo

Sven "Sven-Pelle" Pettersson (15 December 1911 – 6 January 2000) was a Swedish swimmer and water polo player who competed in the 1928 Summer Olympics and in the 1936 Summer Olympics.

In 1928 he was eliminated in the first round of the men's 100 m freestyle competition. As a member of the Swedish relay team he finished fifth in the men's 4 × 200 m freestyle relay event.

Eight years later he was part of the Swedish water polo team which finished seventh in the water polo tournament. He played three matches. As a member of the Swedish relay team he finished eighth in the men's 4 × 200 m freestyle relay event.

Pettersson represented SK Neptun.
