= Per Holmström =

Swedish swimmer

Personal information
- Born: 13 February 1901 Gothenburg, Sweden
- Died: 27 January 1982 (aged 80) Gothenburg, Sweden

Sport
- Sport: Swimming

Per Holmström (13 February 1901 – 27 January 1982) was a Swedish swimmer. He competed in the men's 100 metre backstroke event at the 1920 Summer Olympics.
