= Ingvar Eriksson =

Swedish swimmer (1944–2015)

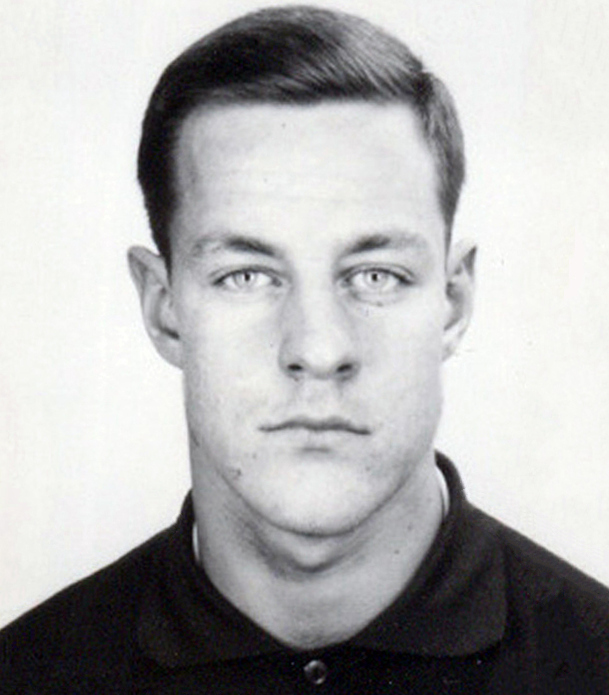

Personal information
- Born: 1 October 1944 Sundsvalls, Sweden
- Died: 7 January 2015 (aged 70)
- Height: 1.88 m (6 ft 2 in)
- Weight: 90 kg (200 lb)

Sport
- Sport: Swimming
- Club: Sundsvalls SS
Medal record
Representing Sweden
European Championships
Bronze medal – third place	1966 Utrecht	4×100 m freestyle
Bronze medal – third place	1966 Utrecht	4×200 m freestyle

Karl Ingvar Eriksson (1 October 1944 – 7 January 2015) was a Swedish swimmer who won two bronze medals in the freestyle relays at the 1966 European Aquatics Championships. He competed at the 1964 and 1968 Summer Olympics in four freestyle and butterfly events with the best achievement of fifth place in the 4 × 100 m freestyle relay in 1964.

Eriksson represented Sundsvalls SS.
