= Per-Olof Olsson =

Swedish swimmer

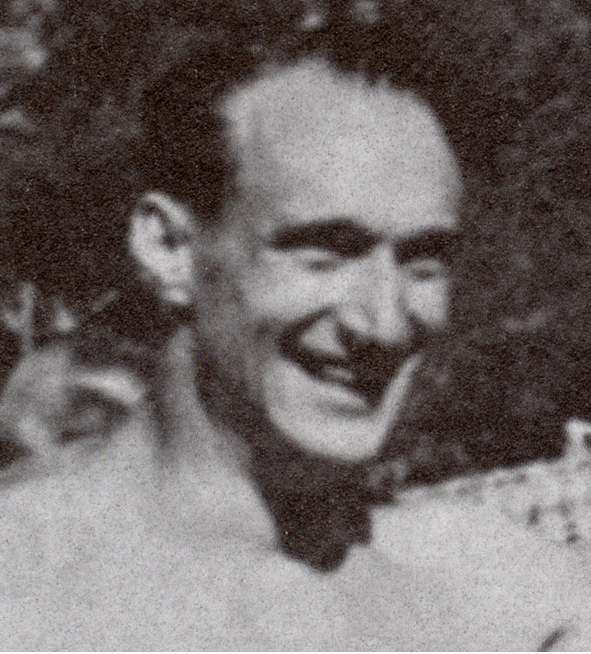

Personal information
- Born: 10 December 1918 Stockholm, Sweden
- Died: 12 October 1982 (aged 63) Vadstena, Sweden

Sport
- Sport: Swimming
- Strokes: Freestyle, backstroke
- Club: SoIK Hellas, Nacka
Medal record
Representing Sweden
European Championships (LC)
Gold medal – first place	1947 Monte Carlo	4×200 m freestyle
Silver medal – second place	1947 Monte Carlo	100 m freestyle

Per-Olof Verner Olsson (10 December 1918 – 12 October 1982) was a Swedish swimmer who competed in the 1948 Summer Olympics. He finished fourth in the 4 × 200 m relay and sixth in the 100 m freestyle. He won two medals in these events at the 1947 European Aquatics Championships.
