= Ove Nylén =

Swedish swimmer

Personal information
- Born: February 14, 1959 (age 67) Kumla, Örebro, Sweden

Sport
- Sport: Swimming
- Strokes: Butterfly
- Club: Kristianstads SLS

Ove Nylén (born 14 February 1959) is a Swedish former swimmer. He finished 13th in 200 m butterfly in the 1980 Summer Olympics.

== Clubs ==
- Kristianstads SLS
