= Björn Borg (swimmer) =

Swedish swimmer (1919–2009)

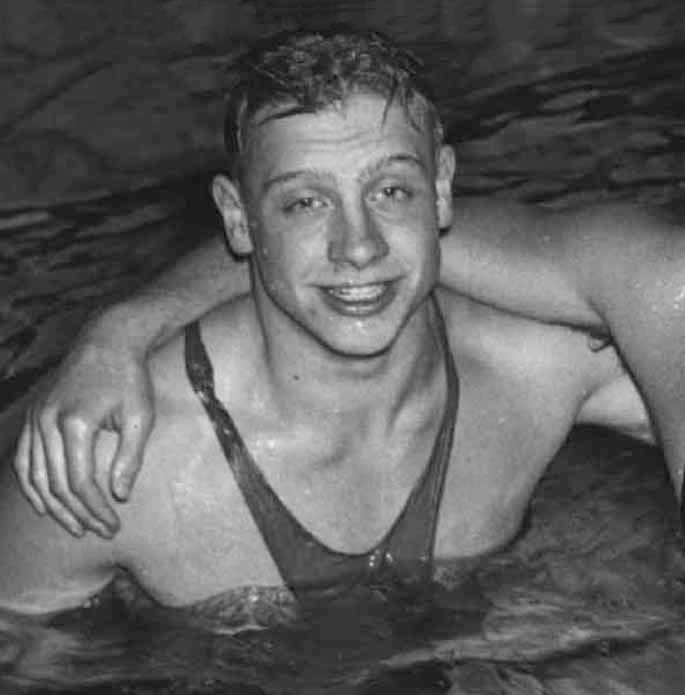

Personal information
- Born: 14 November 1919 Kinna, Sweden
- Died: 13 April 2009 (aged 89) Zürich, Switzerland

Sport
- Sport: Swimming
- Strokes: Freestyle, backstroke
- Club: Norrköpings KK
Medal record
Representing Sweden
European Championships
Gold medal – first place	1938 London	400 m freestyle
Gold medal – first place	1938 London	1500 m freestyle

Björn Borg (14 November 1919 – 13 April 2009) was a Swedish swimmer. He competed at the 1936 Summer Olympics in the 4 × 200 m freestyle and 100 m backstroke and finished eighth in the relay. He won the 400 m and 1500 m freestyle events at the 1938 European Aquatics Championships and was awarded the Svenska Dagbladet Gold Medal the same year. In 1959, Borg moved to Switzerland, where he worked as a businessman. He died in Zurich aged 89.

Preceded by Torsten Ullman	Svenska Dagbladet Gold Medal; 1938	Succeeded by Sven Selånger
