= Pär Gustafsson =

Swedish politician (born 1983)

Member of the Riksdag
- Incumbent
- Assumed office 28 September 2026
- Constituency: Gothenburg Municipality

Personal details
- Born: 25 August 1983 (age 43) Sweden
- Party: Liberals
- Education: University of Gothenburg

Pär Joakim Gustafsson (born 25 August 1983) is a Swedish author and politician from the Liberals. He has been a member of the Riksdag since 2026, elected for the Gothenburg Municipality constituency.

== Biography ==
Gustafsson grew up in the Gothenburg suburb of Angered and studied at the University of Gothenburg. He has been a member of the Gothenburg City Council since 2018 and is the second vice-chairman of the Education Committee. During the first half of 2026, he served as a municipal councilor and member of the Gothenburg City Executive Board.

In 2025 he published the book Under frihetens, rättens och rassultons fana. The book depicts the formation of the People's Party in 1934 and the gathering of the liberal family and the leading representatives nationally, in Western Sweden and in Gothenburg. The book ends with a new call to defend freedom.

Since 2019, he has been the union chairman of the Liberals of Western Sweden. Since 2025, he has been a member of the Liberals' party leadership and party board. Previously, he was vice chairman of the Liberals of Gothenburg.

During the 2018-2022 term of office, he was the 1st Vice Chairman of the City Council, Deputy Mayor and Chairman of the Education Committee. Before that, he was a long-time employee of the People's Party, later the Liberal Party, office at the City Council.

In 2007 he was elected chairman of Liberala studenter, a position he left in December 2010. In that role, he actively pushed the issue of abolishing compulsory student union membership.

Gustafsson has previously been 2nd vice chairman and member of the Örgryte-Härlanda district committee and deputy on the Gunnared district committee.

== Sources ==
=== Literature ===
- Patrick Krassén & Erik List: "60 år av radikalism. Liberala Studentförbundets historia 1947-2007" (2007)

== See also ==
- List of members of the Riksdag, 2026–2030
