= Per-Olof Ericsson =

Swedish swimmer (1938–2024)

Personal information
- Nationality: Swedish
- Born: 4 April 1938 Stockholm, Sweden
- Died: 12 September 2024 (aged 86)

Sport
- Sport: Swimming

Per-Olof Ericsson (4 April 1938 – 12 September 2024) was a Swedish swimmer. He competed in the men's 400 metre freestyle at the 1960 Summer Olympics. Ericsson represented SK Neptun.
