= Rolf Julin =

Swedish water polo player

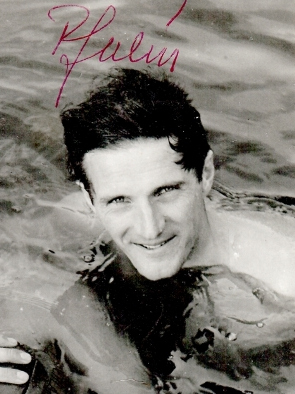

Personal information
- Born: 14 April 1918 Stockholm, Sweden
- Died: 26 July 1997 (aged 79) Helsingborg, Sweden

Sport
- Sport: Water polo
- Club: Stockholms KK

Rolf Julin (14 April 1918 – 26 July 1997) was a Swedish water polo player. He was part of the Swedish team that finished fifth at the 1948 Summer Olympics. His father Harald and younger brother Åke were also Olympic water polo players.
