= Roland Johansson (swimmer) =

Swedish swimmer

Personal information
- Nationality: Swedish
- Born: 15 February 1909 Norrköping, Sweden
- Died: 11 November 1979 (aged 70) Helsingborg, Sweden

Sport
- Sport: Swimming

Roland Johansson (15 February 1909 – 11 November 1979) was a Swedish swimmer. He competed in the men's 100 metre backstroke event at the 1928 Summer Olympics.

Johansson represented Norrköpings KK.
