= Peter Feil =

Swedish swimmer

Personal information
- Born: 25 March 1947 Eskilstuna, Sweden
- Died: 28 February 2017 (aged 69)

Sport
- Sport: Swimming

Peter Feil (25 March 1947 – 28 February 2017) was a Swedish butterfly swimmer. He competed in two events (the men's 100 and 200 metre butterfly) at the 1968 Summer Olympics.
