= Bengt Rask =

Swedish swimmer (1928–2024)

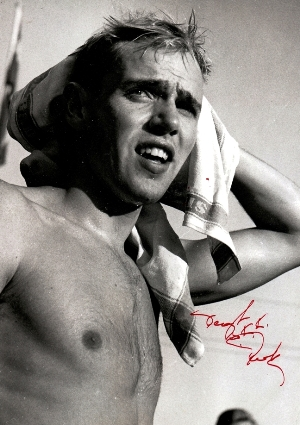
- Rask circa 1950

Personal information
- Born: 28 April 1928 Stockholm, Sweden
- Died: 14 July 2024 (aged 96)

Sport
- Sport: Swimming
- Club: Stockholms KK
Medal record
Representing Sweden
European Championships
Bronze medal – third place	1950 Vienna	200 m breaststroke

Karl Bengt Rask (28 April 1928 – 14 July 2024) was a Swedish swimmer who won a bronze medal relay medals in the 200 m breaststroke at the 1950 European Aquatics Championships. Two years later he competed in the same event at the 1952 Summer Olympics but was eliminated in the preliminaries.

Rask died on 14 July 2024, at the age of 96.
