= Göran Titus =

Swedish swimmer

Medal record

Men's swimming

Representing Sweden

European Championships (LC)
| Bronze medal – third place | 1991 Athens | 4×100 m freestyle |

Göran Lars Titus (born 7 June 1967) is a former Swedish freestyle swimmer. He competed in the 1988 Summer Olympics and in the 1992 Summer Olympics. His best individual result is a 9th place in the 50 m freestyle 1992.

== Clubs ==
- Örebro SA
- Karlskrona SS
