= Johan Nyström (swimmer) =

Swedish swimmer

Personal information
- Full name: Johan Olof Nyström
- Nationality: Sweden
- Born: 16 November 1975 (age 50) Sollefteå, Sweden
- Height: 5 ft 11 in (180 cm)
- Weight: 170 lb (77 kg)

Sport
- Sport: Swimming
- Strokes: Freestyle
Medal record
World Championships (SC)
Gold medal – first place	2000 Athens	4x100 m Freestyle

Johan Olof Nyström (born 16 November 1975) is a Swedish swimmer. He was born in Sollefteå, but grew up in Skellefteå, Västerbotten.

He competed at the 2000 Olympic Games in Sydney, Australia.

Nyström represented Sundsvalls SS.

== Sources ==
- Men's short course Meters World records as of 18 November 2007.
- Evans, Hilary; Gjerde, Arild; Heijmans, Jeroen; Mallon, Bill; et al. "Johan Nyström". Olympics at Sports-Reference.com. Sports Reference LLC. Archived from the original on 19 May 2011.
