= Göte Andersson =

Swedish water polo player

Personal information
- Born: February 19, 1909; Stockholm, Sweden
- Died: May 12, 1975 (aged 66); Uppsala, Sweden

Sport
- Sport: Water polo

Göte Erling Andersson (19 February 1909 – 12 May 1975) was a Swedish water polo player who competed in the 1936 Summer Olympics.

In 1936 he was part of the Swedish team which finished seventh in the water polo tournament. He played five matches.

At club level, Andersson represented Stockholms KK.
