= Håkan Bengtsson =

Swedish swimmer (1943–2026)

Personal information
- Born: 13 April 1942 Karlskrona, Sweden
- Died: 20 January 2026 (aged 83)

Sport
- Sport: Swimming

Per Håkan Bengtsson (13 April 1942 – 20 January 2026) was a Swedish swimmer. He competed in the men's 200 metre butterfly at the 1960 Summer Olympics. Bengtsson represented Stockholmspolisens IF. He died in January 2026, at the age of 83.
