= Tage Wissnell =

Swedish swimmer and footballer

Personal information
- Born: 27 July 1905 Stockholm, Sweden
- Died: 13 May 1984 (aged 78) Helsingborg, Sweden

Sport
- Sport: Swimming

Tage Wissnell (27 July 1905 – 13 May 1984) was a Swedish swimmer and footballer. He competed in the men's 200 metre breaststroke event at the 1928 Summer Olympics.
