= Hans Tegeback =

Swedish swimmer

Personal information
- Full name: Hans Erik Tegeback
- Born: 30 May 1950 (age 76) Stockholm, Sweden

Sport
- Sport: Swimming

Hans Erik Tegeback (born 30 May 1950) is a Swedish former backstroke swimmer. He competed in two events at the 1968 Summer Olympics.

Tegeback represented Sundsvalls SS.
