= Bernt Nilsson =

Swedish swimmer

Personal information
- Born: 22 August 1939 (age 86) Gothenburg, Sweden

Sport
- Sport: Swimming

Bernt Nilsson (born 22 August 1939) is a Swedish former swimmer. He competed in the men's 200 metre breaststroke at the 1960 Summer Olympics.
