= Dan Larsson =

Swedish swimmer

Medal record

Men's swimming

Representing Sweden

World Championships (LC)
Bronze medal – third place	1978 Berlin	4×100 m freestyle

Dan Larsson (born 14 August 1958) is a Swedish former swimmer. He participated in the 1976 Summer Olympics, competing in freestyle and relay events. He finished 23rd in the 100 m freestyle and 11th in the 4×100 m medley relay.

== Clubs ==
- Sundsvalls SS
