= Mikael Brandén =

Swedish swimmer

Personal information
- Born: December 11, 1959 (age 66) Stockholm, Sweden

Sport
- Sport: Swimming
- Club: Stockholmspolisens IF

Bert Mikael Brandén (born 11 December 1959) is a former Swedish backstroke swimmer. Brandén participated in the 1976 Summer Olympics, where he finished 29th in 100 m backstroke and 11th in the 4×100 m medley team.

A 1973 photograph depicting Brandén swimming outside Fort Lauderdale, Florida was used as cover art for the 1974 Bryan Ferry single ”The 'In' Crowd”.

== Clubs ==
- Stockholmspolisens IF
