= Glen Christiansen =

Swedish swimmer

Personal information
- Nationality: Swedish
- Born: 10 February 1957 (age 69) Gothenburg
- Height: 1.78 m (5 ft 10 in)
- Weight: 75 kg (165 lb)
- Website: www.glen-christiansen.se

Sport
- Sport: Swimming
Medal record
Men's swimming
Representing Sweden
European Championships (LC)
Silver medal – second place	1981 Split	4×100 m medley

Glen Robert Christiansen (born 10 February 1957) is a former Swedish Olympic swimmer. He competed in the 1980 Summer Olympics, where he finished 11th in the 200 m breaststroke.

Since then he has had continued success as a Masters swimmer and has pursued an international career as a swimming coach.

== 2013 accident and recovery ==
In February 2013 he suffered a fall down a flight of stairs whilst in Tenerife, fracturing his skull from ear to ear. He was flown to Hamburg and kept in an induced coma for three weeks. Within six months he had recovered sufficiently to compete successfully in a 2.5 kilometres (1.6 mi) open water race in the river Elbe outside of Hamburg

== Clubs ==
- Göteborgs KK Najaden
- S02 Göteborg
- SOIK Hellas
- MASS
- SK Neptun
- SG Hamburg
- Hamburger Schwimm Club
- Mainichi Masters
- The Oahu Club
- USG Copenhagen
- Göteborg Sim
- SV Poseidon
- Tenerife Masters

== Publications ==
- Wischmann, Franziska; Christiansen, Glen (8 July 2013). Schwimmen: Besser - Effizienter - Schneller [Swimming: Better - Efficiently - Faster] (in German). Bielefeld: Delius Klasing. ISBN 978-3768836982.
