= Bengt-Olov Almstedt =

Swedish swimmer

Personal information
- Born: 4 April 1942 (age 84) Örebro, Sweden

Sport
- Sport: Swimming

Bengt-Olov Almstedt (born 4 April 1942) is a Swedish former backstroke and freestyle swimmer. He competed in two events at the 1960 Summer Olympics.
