= Lars-Erik Bengtsson =

Swedish swimmer (born 1942)

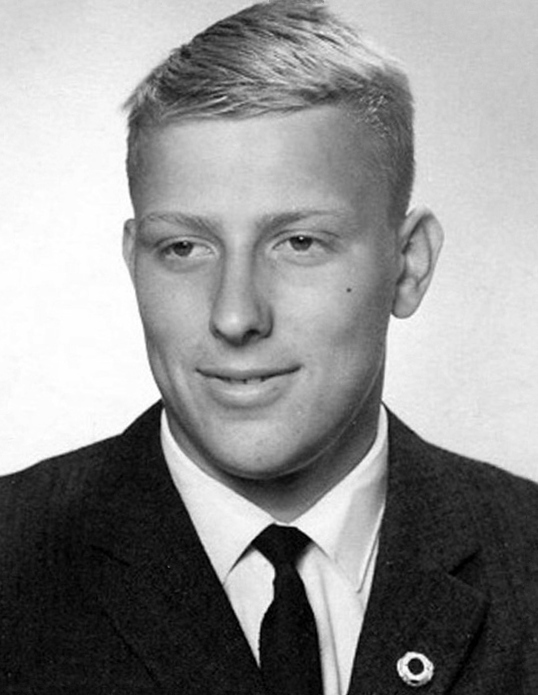
- Bengtsson circa 1960

Personal information
- Full name: Willy Lars-Erik Bengtsson
- Born: 28 May 1942 (age 84) Solna Municipality, Sweden
- Height: 182 cm (6 ft 0 in)
- Weight: 82 kg (181 lb)

Sport
- Sport: Swimming
- Strokes: Freestyle
- Club: SK Neptun, Stockholm
Medal record
Representing Sweden
European Championships
Gold medal – first place	1962 Leipzig	4×200 m freestyle

Willy Lars-Erik Bengtsson (born 28 May 1942) is a retired Swedish freestyle swimmer who won the European title in the 4 × 200 m freestyle relay in 1962. He competed at the 1960 Summer Olympics in the 1500 m and 4 × 200 m events and finished sixth in the relay.
