= Cletus Andersson =

Swedish water polo player (1893–1971)

Personal information
- Born: 4 March 1893 Stockholm, Sweden
- Died: 12 July 1971 (aged 78) Stockholm, Sweden

Sport
- Sport: Water polo
- Club: SK Neptun, Stockholm

Cletus Erik Thule Andersson (4 March 1893 – 12 July 1971) was a Swedish water polo player. Together with his elder brother Vilhelm he was part of the Swedish team that finished fourth at the 1924 Summer Olympics. Cletus played all six matches and scored four goals.
