= Jonas Andersson (swimmer) =

Swedish swimmer

Medal record

Representing Sweden

Men's swimming

European LC Championships
Bronze medal – third place	2008 Eindhoven	4×100 m medley

Jonas Carl Andersson (born 2 June 1984) is a Swedish swimmer from Stockholm, representing SK Neptun from Stockholm.

== Biography ==
Jonas Andersson was born on 2 June 1984 in Stockholm, to Ewa and Jan Andersson.

He competed at the 2001 Nordic Junior Championships in Fredrikshavn, where he finished third in the 200 m breaststroke.

At the 2002 European Junior Swimming Championships in Linz, he finished 12th in the 200 m breaststroke.

Jonas Andersson attended Södra Latins gymnasium in Stockholm and studied Economics at Stockholm School of Economics. He graduated with a Bachelor's degree in Economics at the University of Nevada, Las Vegas. He has returned to the Stockholm School of Economics to finish his master's degree. At the University of Nevada, Las Vegas, he competed with the UNLV Rebels. At the 2006 Mountain West Conference Championships, he finished third in the 200 y breaststroke, and in the 2007 championships, he won the 200 y breaststroke and finished second in the 100 y breaststroke. Both years he was a part of the 4x50 y medley relay gold winning team.

In 2007, he won his first individual Swedish Swimming Championships titles, when he won all the individual breaststroke events (50 m breaststroke, 100 m breaststroke and 200 m breaststroke).

Andersson competed for Sweden at the 2008 Olympics, where he narrowly missed his personal best while placing third in his heat with a time of 1:01.77 on 100 m breaststroke and maintained his top 50 in the world status. In total, he finished 31st in the 100 m breaststroke. He also was a part of the 4 × 100 m medley relay team that finished 11th in the prelims.

== Personal bests ==
=== Long course (50 m) ===
Event	Time		Date	Meet	Location	Ref
50 m breaststroke	28.37	(sf)	22 Mar 2008	European Championships	Eindhoven, Netherlands	
100 m breaststroke	1:01.60	NR (sf)	18 Mar 2008	European Championships	Eindhoven, Netherlands	
200 m breaststroke	2:14.83	(sf)	20 Mar 2008	European Championships	Eindhoven, Netherlands	

Legend: WR – World record; ER – European record; NR – Swedish record;
Records not set in finals: h – heat; sf – semifinal; r – relay 1st leg; rh – relay heat 1st leg; b – B final; † – en route to final mark; tt – time trial

=== Short course (25 m) ===
Event	Time		Date	Meet	Location	Ref
50 m breaststroke	28.37	(h)	23 Nov 2007	World Cup	Belo Horizonte, Brazil	
100 m breaststroke	1:01.06	(h)	24 Nov 2007	World Cup	Belo Horizonte, Brazil	
200 m breaststroke	2:12.93		20 Nov 2004	Swedish Grand Prix	Malmö, Sweden	

Legend: WR – World record; ER – European record; NR – Swedish record;
Records not set in finals: h – heat; sf – semifinal; r – relay 1st leg; rh – relay heat 1st leg; b – B final; † – en route to final mark; tt – time trial

== Clubs ==
- SK Neptun
