= Erik Eriksson (swimmer) =

Swedish swimmer

Personal information
- Full name: Erik Frans Oscar Eriksson
- Born: 28 May 1879 Stockholm, Sweden
- Died: 24 August 1940 (aged 61) Brooklyn, New York, U.S.

Sport
- Sport: Swimming
- Strokes: Backstroke, freestyle
- Club: Stockholms Kappsimningsklubb

Erik Frans Oscar Eriksson (28 May 1879 – 24 August 1940) was a Swedish swimmer who competed at the 1900 Olympics in the men's 200 meters and 1000 meters freestyle, and 200 meters backstroke. He became Sweden's first swimmer at the Summer Olympics.

Eriksson represented Stockholms KK. He won seven individual Swedish championship titles with the club, one in the 100 metre freestyle at the 1901 Swedish Swimming Championships, three on 1000 metre freestyle, in 1900, 1901, and 1902, and three on 1 mile freestyle, in 1900, 1901, and 1902.
