= Charles Norelius =

Swedish-American swimmer and coach

Personal information
- Born: March 4, 1882 Stockholm, Sweden
- Died: November 22, 1974 (aged 92) Palm Beach, Florida, United States

Sport
- Sport: Swimming
- Club: Stockholms KK

Bror Charles Norelius (March 4, 1882 – November 22, 1974) was a Swedish-American swimmer and coach. In 1903 he won all freestyle events from 200 m to one mile at the Swedish championships. He competed at the 1906 Olympics in the one mile and 4×250 m freestyle events and finished fifth in the relay. The same year, after gaining popularity as an Olympian, Norelius became a swimming coach. He was an early advocate of the modern crawl style, and argued that frequent leg kicks only exhaust the swimmer and increase the drag without adding much propulsion. Later Norelius moved to the United States and coached there until 1966, when he broke his hip in a bad fall. His most famous trainees include Arne Borg, John J. Pershing, Barbara Hutton, Grace Moore, Edward VIII, and his daughter, triple Olympic champion Martha Norelius. He also taught swimming to his other three children. During World War II, Norelius was responsible for rehabilitation exercises in water at the Ashford General Hospital in White Sulphur Springs. He died in Florida, aged 92.
