= Pierre Roger (swimmer) =

French swimmer

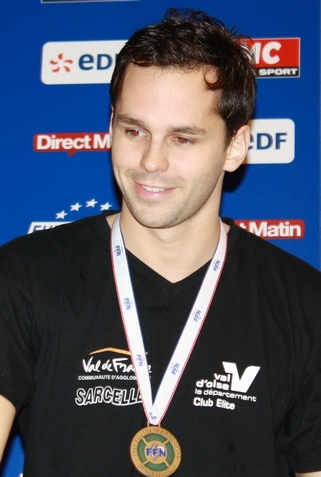

Personal information
- Born: 8 December 1983 (age 42) La Flèche, Sarthe, France
Medal record
Men's swimming
Representing France
European Championships (LC)
Silver medal – second place	2002 Berlin	4×100 m medley
Bronze medal – third place	2002 Berlin	100 m backstroke
European Championships (SC)
Bronze medal – third place	2008 Rijeka	200 m backstroke

Pierre Roger (born 8 December 1983 in La Flèche, Sarthe) is a backstroke swimmer from France, who won the bronze medal in the men's individual 100 metres backstroke event at the 2002 European Championships in Berlin, Germany. He represented his native country at the 2004 Summer Olympics in Athens, Greece.
