= 1910 Finnish championships in aquatics =

From 1906 to 1926, the Finnish Swimming Federation did not arrange a dedicated national competition, but spread out the hosting duties of the championship events to multiple clubs.

== Diving ==
=== Men ===
==== Plain ====
Competed in Tampere on 30–31 July 1910.

Rank	Name	Placing figure	Score
1st place, gold medalist(s)	Toivo Aro	3	117.0 points
2nd place, silver medalist(s)	Elis Sivén	6	110.2 points
3rd place, bronze medalist(s)	Albert Nyman	10	106.6 points
4	W. Nikula	12	106.5 points
5	Leo Suni	12	105.5 points

==== Platform ====
Competed in Helsinki on 13 July 1910.

Rank	Name	Placing figure	Score
1st place, gold medalist(s)	Toivo Aro	3	257.65 points
2nd place, silver medalist(s)	Oskar Wetzell	6	238.40 points
3rd place, bronze medalist(s)	Leo Suni	9	142.33 points

==== Springboard ====
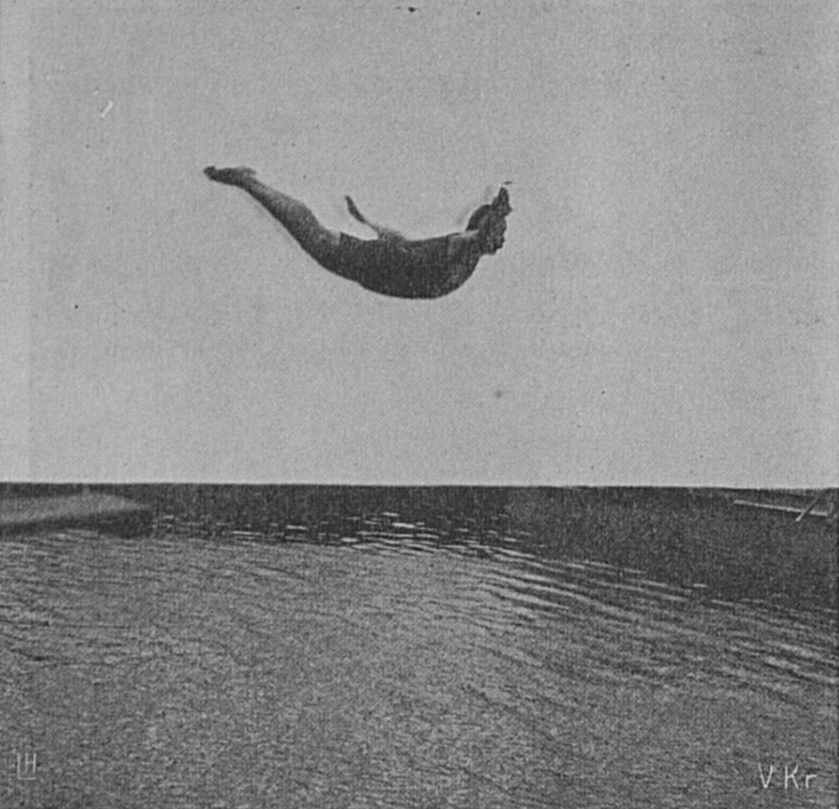
Albert Nyman, Finnish champion of springboard diving

Competed in Helsinki on 13–14 August 1910.

Rank	Name	Placing figure	Score
1st place, gold medalist(s)	Albert Nyman	3	211.30 points
2nd place, silver medalist(s)	Elis Johansson	7	202.80 points
3rd place, bronze medalist(s)	Oskar Wetzell	8	200.10 points
4	Leo Suni	12	161.90 points
5	F. Wester	15	152.95 points

=== Women ===
==== Platform ====
Competed in Helsinki on 13–14 August 1910.

Rank	Name	Placing figure	Score
1st place, gold medalist(s)	Valborg Florström	3	106.50 points
2nd place, silver medalist(s)	Ester Laamanen	6	101.75 points
3rd place, bronze medalist(s)	Anna Järvinen	10	93.50 points
4	Anna Björkman	12	91.45 points

== Swimming ==
=== Men ===
==== 100 metre freestyle ====
Competed in Helsinki on 13 August 1910.

Rank	Name	Time
1st place, gold medalist(s)	Artturi Helenius	1:13.4 NR
2nd place, silver medalist(s)	Jussi Kahma	1:16.5
3rd place, bronze medalist(s)	Jarl Bjelke	1:19.2
4	Yrjö Seuderling	1:20.0
5	Wolter Bremer	1:24.6
6	Martti Salokannel	1:25.0
7	A. Tschernichin	1:25.4
8	E. Salmi	1:27.6
9	William Ekström	1:30.2

==== 1000 metre freestyle ====
Competed in Vaasa on 23–24 July 1910.

Rank	Name	Time
1st place, gold medalist(s)	Jarl Wasström	18:17.1
2nd place, silver medalist(s)	Arvo Aaltonen	18:29.9
3rd place, bronze medalist(s)	Kyösti Järvinen	18:57.4
4	Yrjö Seuderling	19:29.6

==== 200 metre breaststroke ====
Competed in Pori on 7 August 1910.

Rank	Name	Time
1st place, gold medalist(s)	Lennart Lindroos	3:08.9
2nd place, silver medalist(s)	Kyösti Järvinen	3:09.2
3rd place, bronze medalist(s)	Arvo Aaltonen	3:12.0
4	Lauri Aaltonen	3:39.1

==== 100 metre life saving ====
Competed in Pori on 7 August 1910.

Rank	Name	Time
1st place, gold medalist(s)	Jussi Kahma	2:09.5
2nd place, silver medalist(s)	Erkki Ojanen	2:12.0
3rd place, bronze medalist(s)	Lennart Lindroos	2:16.5
4	Elis Johansson	2:19.7
5	Arvo Aaltonen	2:39.0

==== 4 × 50 metre freestyle relay ====
Competed in Helsinki on 14 August 1910.

Rank	Club	Team	Time
1st place, gold medalist(s)	Vaasan Uimaseura	Wolter Bremer, W. Bjelke, Jussi Kahma, Artturi Helenius	2:13.4
2nd place, silver medalist(s)	Turun Urheilunystävät	Bruno Lindberg, B. Lilius, Arvid Rydman, Yrjö Seuderling	2:27.4
3rd place, bronze medalist(s)	Helsingfors Simsällskap	Toivo Einiö, K. Salmi, Väinö Warelius, William Ekström	2:31.0

=== Women ===
==== 100 metre freestyle ====
Competed in Tampere on 31 July 1910.

Rank	Name	Time
1st place, gold medalist(s)	Regina Kari	1:48.8 NR
2nd place, silver medalist(s)	Anna Björkman	1:52.4
3rd place, bronze medalist(s)	Helmi Laaksonen	1:53.8
4	Toini Nurmi	1:53.9
5	Lilli Blomster	1:54.7
6	Hulda Helenius	1:54.7

== Water polo ==
=== Men ===
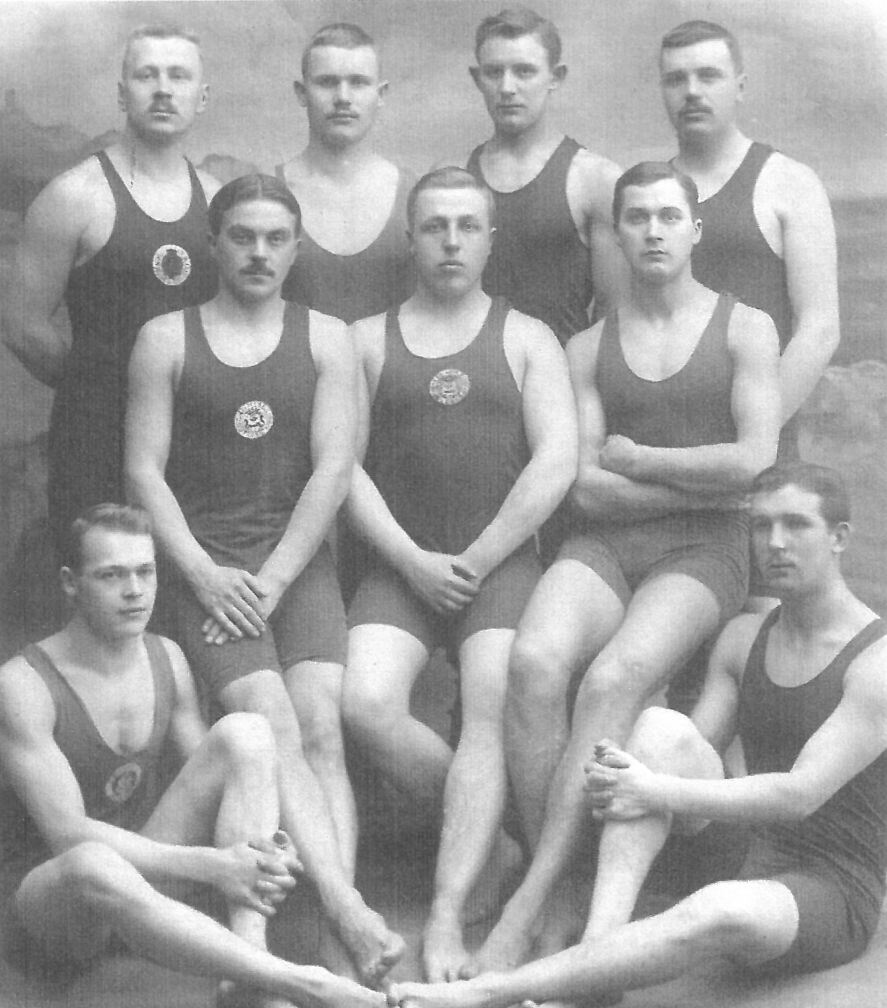
Championship-winning water polo team of Helsingfors Simsällskap in 1910 with two reserve players

Competed in Vaasa on 23–24 July 1910.

Rank	Club	Team
1st place, gold medalist(s)	Helsingfors Simsällskap	Hugo Jonsson (C), Gunnar Ahlblad, Eino Haavisto, Eino Karjalainen, Lennart Lindfors, Väinö Varelius, Jarl Wasström
2nd place, silver medalist(s)	Vaasan Uimaseura	Jussi Kahma (C), Artturi Helenius, D. Snellman, E. Källroos, A. Backman, E. Cawonius, Wolter Bremer, W. Asplund

The championship was settled by one match, won by Helsingfors Simsällskap 4–1.

== Sources ==
- Teräsvirta, Paavo, ed. (1956). Suomen uimaliitto. Finska simförbundet. 1906–1956 (in Finnish). Helsinki: Finnish Swimming Federation. pp. 154–159.
