= 1911 Finnish championships in aquatics =

From 1906 to 1926, the Finnish Swimming Federation did not arrange a dedicated national competition, but spread out the hosting duties of the championship events to multiple clubs.

== Diving ==
=== Men ===
==== Plain ====
Competed in Tampere on 13 August 1911.

| Rank | Name | Placing figure | Score |
|---|---|---|---|
| 1st place, gold medalist(s) | Toivo Aro | 3 | 117.05 points |
| 2nd place, silver medalist(s) | Kalle Kainuvaara | 7 | 109.60 points |
| 3rd place, bronze medalist(s) | Gunnar Ahlblad | 8 | 106.75 points |
| 4 | Elis Sivén | 13 | 103.25 points |
| 5 | Eino Karjalainen | 15 | 103.50 points |
| 6 | Artur Wetzell | 16 | 102.00 points |
| 7 | Tauno Ilmoniemi | 20 | 99.45 points |
| 8 | Oskar Wetzell | 23 | 99.50 points |

==== Platform ====
Competed in Tampere on 13 August 1911.

| Rank | Name | Placing figure | Score |
|---|---|---|---|
| 1st place, gold medalist(s) | Oskar Wetzell | 5 | 232.10 points |
| 2nd place, silver medalist(s) | Toivo Aro | 6 | 230.65 points |
| 3rd place, bronze medalist(s) | Kalle Kainuvaara | 7 | 225.80 points |

==== Springboard ====
Competed in Helsinki on 6 August 1911.

| Rank | Name | Placing figure | Score |
|---|---|---|---|
| 1st place, gold medalist(s) | Albert Nyman | 3 | 220.60 points |
| 2nd place, silver medalist(s) | Oskar Wetzell | 6 | 210.70 points |
| 3rd place, bronze medalist(s) | Leo Suni | 9 | 197.90 points |
| 4 | Toivo Einiö | 12 | 169.43 points |

=== Women ===
==== Platform ====
Competed in Vaasa on 29 July 1911.

| Rank | Name | Placing figure | Score |
|---|---|---|---|
| 1st place, gold medalist(s) | Valborg Florström | 3 | 105.75 points |
| 2nd place, silver medalist(s) | Ester Laamanen | 7 | 98.50 points |
| 3rd place, bronze medalist(s) | Senni Aaltonen | 8 | 93.00 points |

== Swimming ==
=== Men ===
==== 100 metre freestyle ====
Competed in Tampere on 12 August 1911.

| Rank | Name | Time |
|---|---|---|
| 1st place, gold medalist(s) | Artturi Helenius | 1:12.4 NR |
| 2nd place, silver medalist(s) | Jussi Kahma | 1:14.9 |
| 3rd place, bronze medalist(s) | Martti Salokannel | 1:17.0 |
| 4 | Erkki Ojanen | 1:18.3 |
| 5 | Yrjö Seuderling | 1:19.2 |
| 6 | Wolter Bremer | 1:20.7 |

==== 500 metre freestyle ====
Competed in Vaasa on 30 July 1911.

| Rank | Name | Time |
|---|---|---|
| 1st place, gold medalist(s) | Martti Salokannel | 8:26.0 NR |
| 2nd place, silver medalist(s) | Arvo Aaltonen | 8:32.5 |
| 3rd place, bronze medalist(s) | G. Hanstén | 8:35.4 |
| 4 | Vilhelm Lindgrén | 9:03.7 |

==== 1000 metre freestyle ====
Competed in Helsinki on 6 August 1911.

| Rank | Name | Time |
|---|---|---|
| 1st place, gold medalist(s) | Jarl Wasström | 17:46.0 NR |
| 2nd place, silver medalist(s) | Martti Salokannel | 18:17.4 |
| 3rd place, bronze medalist(s) | Lennart Lindroos | 18:44.6 |
| 4 | Arvo Aaltonen | 18:45.6 |
| 5 | G. Hanstén | 18:59.4 |
| 6 | H. Seppänen | 20:28.4 |

==== 100 metre backstroke ====
Competed in Vaasa on 29 July 1911.

| Rank | Name | Time |
|---|---|---|
| 1st place, gold medalist(s) | Lennart Lindroos | 1:36.6 NR |
| 2nd place, silver medalist(s) | Herman Cederberg | 1:45.2 |

==== 200 metre breaststroke ====
Competed in Tampere on 12–13 August 1911.

| Rank | Name | Time |
|---|---|---|
| 1st place, gold medalist(s) | Arvo Aaltonen | 3:04.9 NR |
| 2nd place, silver medalist(s) | Lennart Lindroos | 3:05.9 |
| 3rd place, bronze medalist(s) | Herman Cederberg | 3:07.0 |
| 4 | Vilhelm Lindgrén | 3:10.7 |
| 5 | V. Tuukkanen | 3:12.7 |
| 6 | N. Mantere | 3:29.1 |
| 7 | Lauri Aaltonen | 3:31.7 |

==== 100 metre life saving ====
Competed in Helsinki on 6 August 1911.

| Rank | Name | Time |
|---|---|---|
| 1st place, gold medalist(s) | Jussi Kahma | 1:55.6 NR |
| 2nd place, silver medalist(s) | Herman Cederberg | 1:56.0 |
| 3rd place, bronze medalist(s) | A. Tschernichin | 2:04.8 |
| 4 | Lennart Lindroos | 2:06.5 |
| 5 | Erkki Ojanen | 2:18.7 |

==== 4 × 50 metre freestyle relay ====
Competed in Helsinki on 5–6 August 1911.

| Rank | Club | Team | Time |
|---|---|---|---|
| 1st place, gold medalist(s) | Vaasan Uimaseura | Wolter Bremer, V. Bjelke, Jussi Kahma, Artturi Helenius | 2:14.2 |
| 2nd place, silver medalist(s) | Tampereen Uimaseura | Erkki Ojanen, Kalle Aaltonen, J. Laaksonen, J. Viklund | 2:18.8 |
| 3rd place, bronze medalist(s) | Helsingfors Simsällskapet | M. Koroleff, V. Sjöholm, S. Oinila, Toivo Einiö | 2:24.7 |
| 4 | Turun Uimaseura | Yrjö Seuderling, Arvid Rydman, Bruno Lindberg, Väinö Hannula | 2:26.0 |

=== Women ===
==== 100 metre freestyle ====
Competed in Vaasa on 29 July 1911.

| Rank | Name | Time |
|---|---|---|
| 1st place, gold medalist(s) | Tyyne Järvi | 1:43.2 |
| 2nd place, silver medalist(s) | Regina Kari | 1:46.8 |
| 3rd place, bronze medalist(s) | Helga Lehtonen | 1:47.6 |
| 4 | Eva Branders | 1:48.0 |
| 5 | Lilli Blomster | 1:48.5 |
| 6 | Aino Tillikainen | 1:53.9 |
| 7 | Anni Ström | 1:55.2 |
| 8 | Edla Lehto | 1:58.6 |

== Water polo ==
=== Men ===
Competed in Tampere.

| Rank | Club | Team |
|---|---|---|
| 1st place, gold medalist(s) | Helsingfors Simsällskap | Hugo Jonsson, Väinö Warelius, Jarl Wasström, H. Bergström, V. Petroff, V. Sjöholm, A. Haavisto |
| 2nd place, silver medalist(s) | Turun Uimaseura | R. Lönnqvist, J. Ek, Väinö Hannula, V. Pikanen, O. Gylling, Yrjö Seuderling, Eero Ek |
| 3rd place, bronze medalist(s) | Tampereen Uimaseura | Y. Halme, V. Viklund, Erkki Ojanen, G. Helsingius, N. Salin, A. Viklund, K. Koivisto |

Two matches were played:

- 12 August 1911: Helsingfors Simsällskap–Turun Uimaseura 5–2 (0–1, 2–1, 3–0), after extra time
- 13 August 1911: Helsingfors Simsällskap–Tampereen Uimaseura 9–0 (3–0, 6–0)

Second prize went to Turun Uimaseura.

== Sources ==
- Teräsvirta, Paavo, ed. (1956). Suomen uimaliitto. Finska simförbundet. 1906–1956 (in Finnish). Helsinki: Finnish Swimming Federation. pp. 154–159.
