= 1912 Finnish championships in aquatics =

Sports competition in Finland

From 1906 to 1926, the Finnish Swimming Federation did not arrange a dedicated national competition, but spread out the hosting duties of the championship events to multiple clubs.

== Diving ==
=== Men ===
==== Plain ====
Competed in Helsinki on 21 July 1912.

Rank	Name	Placing figure	Score
1st place, gold medalist(s)	Toivo Aro	4	154.90 points
2nd place, silver medalist(s)	Artur Wetzell	9	143.45 points
3rd place, bronze medalist(s)	Eino Karjalainen	11	137.00 points
4	Leo Suni	?	
5	K. Nikula	?	
6	Oskar Wetzell	?	
7	Elis Sivén	?	

==== Platform ====
Competed in Turku on 11 August 1912.

Rank	Name	Placing figure	Score
1st place, gold medalist(s)	Toivo Aro	3	203.40 points
2nd place, silver medalist(s)	Leo Suni	7	192.43 points
3rd place, bronze medalist(s)	Oskar Wetzell	8	191.38 points

==== Springboard ====
Competed in Helsinki on 21 July 1912.

Rank	Name	Placing figure	Score
1st place, gold medalist(s)	Oskar Wetzell	4	325.45 points
2nd place, silver medalist(s)	Albert Nyman	8	313.62 points

=== Women ===
==== Platform ====
Competed in Turku on 11 August 1912.

Rank	Name	Placing figure	Score
1st place, gold medalist(s)	Senni Aaltonen	3	98.25 points
2nd place, silver medalist(s)	Anna Järvinen	7	84.50 points
3rd place, bronze medalist(s)	Hilda Kuusela	8	82.25 points

== Swimming ==
=== Men ===
==== 100 metre freestyle ====
Competed in Helsinki on 20 July 1912.

Rank	Name	Time
1st place, gold medalist(s)	Jussi Kahma	1:11.5 NR
2nd place, silver medalist(s)	Martti Salokannel	1:18.8
3rd place, bronze medalist(s)	Yrjö Seuderling	1:19.3
4	K. Salmi	1:26.9
5	W. Petroff	1:27.0
6	M. Koroleff	1:29.0

==== 500 metre freestyle ====
Competed in Vaasa on 27 July 1912.

Rank	Name	Time
1st place, gold medalist(s)	Martti Salokannel	8:26.6
2nd place, silver medalist(s)	G. Hanstén	8:43.6
3rd place, bronze medalist(s)	V. Petroff	8:57.8

==== 1000 metre freestyle ====
Competed in Helsinki on 21 July 1912.

Rank	Name	Time
1st place, gold medalist(s)	Martti Salokannel	18:49.6
2nd place, silver medalist(s)	Arvo Aaltonen	19:09.2
3rd place, bronze medalist(s)	V. Petroff	19:11.3

==== 100 metre backstroke ====
Competed in Helsinki on 19 July 1912.

Rank	Name	Time
1st place, gold medalist(s)	Lennart Lindroos	1:36.3 NR
2nd place, silver medalist(s)	J. Wiklund	1:37.9

==== 100 metre breaststroke ====
Competed in Vaasa on 27 July 1912.

Rank	Name	Time
1st place, gold medalist(s)	Arvo Aaltonen	1:23.1 NR
2nd place, silver medalist(s)	Lennart Lindroos	1:24.7

==== 200 metre breaststroke ====
Competed in Helsinki on 20 July 1912.

Rank	Name	Time
1st place, gold medalist(s)	Arvo Aaltonen	3:00.0
2nd place, silver medalist(s)	Lennart Lindroos	3:11.0
3rd place, bronze medalist(s)	Vilhelm Lindgrén	3:13.1
4	H. Wasenius	3:17.5

Aaltonen's result broke the world record. It could not be ratified, because the track was inspected to be two centimetres too short.

==== 400 metre breaststroke ====
Competed in Vaasa on 28 July 1912.

Rank	Name	Time
1st place, gold medalist(s)	Arvo Aaltonen	6:33.4 NR

==== 100 metre life saving ====
Competed in Vaasa on 28 July 1912.

Rank	Name	Time
1st place, gold medalist(s)	Herman Cederberg	1:52.7 NR
2nd place, silver medalist(s)	Jussi Kahma	2:00.3

==== 4 × 50 metre freestyle relay ====
Competed in Turku on 10 August 1912.

Rank	Club	Team	Time
1st place, gold medalist(s)	Vaasan Uimaseura	Artturi Helenius, Jussi Kahma, Martti Salokannel, Uuno Mäkipää	2:12.9
2nd place, silver medalist(s)	Helsingfors Simsällskapet	M. Koroleff, H. Wasenius, H. Bergström, I. Sjöström	2:20.4
3rd place, bronze medalist(s)	Turun Uimaseura	Väinö Hannula, R. Lönnqvist, Bruno Lindberg, Yrjö Seuderling	2:25.0

=== Women ===
==== 50 metre freestyle ====
Competed in Turku on 11 August 1912.

Rank	Name	Time
1st place, gold medalist(s)	Lilly Blomster	38.4 NR
2nd place, silver medalist(s)	Anna Järvinen	42.4
3rd place, bronze medalist(s)	Hilda Kuusela	44.1
4	Sofia Gylling	45.9
5	Edit Grönholm	47.3
6	Olga Haapanen	48.3

==== 100 metre freestyle ====
Competed in Vaasa on 28 July 1912.

Rank	Name	Time
1st place, gold medalist(s)	Anna Järvinen	1:39.3 NR
2nd place, silver medalist(s)	Lilly Blomster	1:39.5
3rd place, bronze medalist(s)	Tyyne Järvi	1:41.9

== Water polo ==
=== Men ===
Competed in Helsinki on 20 July 1912.

Rank	Club	Team
1st place, gold medalist(s)	Helsingfors Simsällskap	?
2nd place, silver medalist(s)	Tampereen Uimaseura	?

The championship was settled by one match, won by Helsingfors Simsällskap 6–0 (2–0, 4–0).

== Sources ==
- Teräsvirta, Paavo, ed. (1956). Suomen uimaliitto. Finska simförbundet. 1906–1956 (in Finnish). Helsinki: Finnish Swimming Federation. pp. 154–159.
