= 1921 Finnish championships in aquatics =

From 1906 to 1926, the Finnish Swimming Federation did not arrange a dedicated national competition. Instead, it spread out the hosting duties of the championship events to multiple clubs.

== Artistic swimming ==
=== Men ===
Competed in Helsinki on 6 (technical routine) and 7 (free routine) August 1921.

Rank	Name	Placing figure	Score
1st place, gold medalist(s)	Eino Karjalainen	3	395.66 points
2nd place, silver medalist(s)	Onni Salonius	6	388.66 points

=== Women ===
Competed in Vyborg on 23 (technical routine) and 24 (free routine) July 1921.

Rank	Name	Placing figure	Score
1st place, gold medalist(s)	Magda Odén	3	450.05 points
2nd place, silver medalist(s)	Meeri Statschkun	6	424.10 points

== Diving ==
=== Men ===
==== Plain ====
Competed in Helsinki on 29 (qualification) and 31 (final) July 1921.

===== Final =====
Rank	Name	Placing figure	Score
1st place, gold medalist(s)	Yrjö Valkama	3	111.50 points
2nd place, silver medalist(s)	J. Elo	6	107.75 points
3rd place, bronze medalist(s)	Kalle Kainuvaara	9	101.25 points
4	Hugo Koivuniemi	10	99.50 points
5	J. Nieminen	15	93.50 points

==== Platform ====
Competed in Helsinki on 30 and 31 July 1921.

Rank	Name	Placing figure	Score
1st place, gold medalist(s)	Kalle Kainuvaara	6	235.75 points
2nd place, silver medalist(s)	L. Kyöstilä	8	239.65 points
3rd place, bronze medalist(s)	E. Ovaskainen	11	231.90 points
4	A. Nyman	?	
5	Oskar Wetzell	?	

==== Springboard ====
Competed in Helsinki on 29 and 30 July 1921.

Rank	Name	Placing figure	Score
1st place, gold medalist(s)	Oskar Wetzell	4	147.60 points
2nd place, silver medalist(s)	A. Lindqvist	7	140.93 points
3rd place, bronze medalist(s)	L. Kyöstilä	8	141.90 points
4	A. Nyman	12	129.62 points
5	Kalle Kainuvaara	15	131.38 points
6	U. Mulli	17	112.33 points
7	H. Petas	21	82.10 points

=== Women ===
==== Platform ====
Competed in Vyborg on 24 July 1921.

Rank	Name	Placing figure	Score
1st place, gold medalist(s)	Helga Markelin	5.5	99.25 points
2nd place, silver medalist(s)	Liisa Lehmus	6.5	98.25 points
3rd place, bronze medalist(s)	Aini Ohlsson	7	98.25 points
4	Kerttu Kainuvaara	10	89.25 points

== Swimming ==
=== Men ===
==== 100 metre freestyle ====
Competed in Helsinki on 31 July 1921.

Rank	Name	Time
1st place, gold medalist(s)	Jussi Kahma	1:11.8
2nd place, silver medalist(s)	G. Wasastjerna	1:12.9
3rd place, bronze medalist(s)	A. Eklund	1:15.8
4	H. Belevicz	1:17.7
5	V. Lahtinen	1:28.9

==== 200 metre freestyle ====
Competed in Helsinki on 30 July 1921.

Rank	Name	Time
1st place, gold medalist(s)	Armas Koskinen	3:00.0
2nd place, silver medalist(s)	Jaakko Tiiainen	3:00.0
3rd place, bronze medalist(s)	Jussi Kahma	3:01.0
4	Emil Koskinen	3:07.7
5	A. Viklund	3:11.6
6	Reino Mallenius	3:15.2
7	A. Eklund	3:17.7

==== 500 metre freestyle ====
Competed in Helsinki on 6 August 1921.

Rank	Name	Time
1st place, gold medalist(s)	Armas Koskinen	9:39.1
2nd place, silver medalist(s)	Emil Koskinen	9:40.7
3rd place, bronze medalist(s)	Jaakko Tiiainen	9:48.4
4	Reino Mallenius	9:53.3
5	Viljo Viklund	9:54.2

==== 1000 metre freestyle ====
Competed in Helsinki on 7 August 1921.

Rank	Name	Time
1st place, gold medalist(s)	Jaakko Tiiainen	19:39.8
2nd place, silver medalist(s)	Emil Koskinen	20:03.5
3rd place, bronze medalist(s)	Viljo Viklund	20:54.1
4	Reino Mallenius	20:59.7

==== 100 metre backstroke ====
Competed in Turku on 24 July 1921.

Rank	Name	Time
1st place, gold medalist(s)	Viljo Viklund	1:35.3
2nd place, silver medalist(s)	L. Heinonen	1:36.2
3rd place, bronze medalist(s)	Reino Mallenius	1:36.3
4	V. Lahtinen	1:39.8
5	E. Vatanen	?

==== 200 metre breaststroke ====
Competed in Turku on 24 July 1921.

Rank	Name	Time
1st place, gold medalist(s)	Arvo Aaltonen	3:07.1
2nd place, silver medalist(s)	Viljo Viklund	3:07.5
3rd place, bronze medalist(s)	V. Lehtinen	3:29.0
4	Reino Mallenius	3:29.5
5	K. Lundstedt	?

==== 100 metre life saving ====
Competed in Turku on 24 July 1921.

Rank	Name	Time
1st place, gold medalist(s)	Jussi Kahma	1:24.0
2nd place, silver medalist(s)	A. Eklund	1:26.4
3rd place, bronze medalist(s)	L. Heinonen	1:30.8

==== 4 × 50 metre freestyle relay ====
Competed in Helsinki on 29 July 1921.

Rank	Club	Team	Time
1st place, gold medalist(s)	Vaasan Uimaseura	Ketola, Hellman, Jussi Kahma, A. Enegrén	2:03.3
2nd place, silver medalist(s)	Helsingfors Simsällskap	H. Salmi, A. Belewitcz, H. Belewitcz, G. Wasastjerna	2:06.6
3rd place, bronze medalist(s)	Helsingin Uimarit	Jaakko Tiiainen, Kunnas, L. Saastamoinen, Armas Koskinen	2:07.4

==== 4 × 100 metre freestyle relay ====
Competed in Helsinki on 30 July 1921.

Rank	Club	Team	Time
1st place, gold medalist(s)	Vaasan Uimaseura	Aaltonen, Ketola, A. Enegrén, Jussi Kahma	4:59.4
2nd place, silver medalist(s)	Helsingfors Simsällskap	W. Belewitsch, A. Belewitsch, H. Salmi, G. Wasastjerna	5:09.7
3rd place, bronze medalist(s)	Helsingin Uimarit	Jaakko Tiiainen, A. Järvinen, Vihavainen, Armas Koskinen	5:10.0

=== Women ===
==== 50 metre freestyle ====
Competed in Vyborg on 24 July 1921 (heats and final).

===== Final =====
Rank	Name	Time
1st place, gold medalist(s)	Anna Järvinen	40.2
2nd place, silver medalist(s)	Elin Väkevä	41.0
3rd place, bronze medalist(s)	Elvi Väkevä	43.8
4	Helmi Mäkinen	45.0

==== 100 metre freestyle ====
Competed in Vyborg on 23 July 1921.

Rank	Name	Time
1st place, gold medalist(s)	Elin Väkevä	1:32.3
2nd place, silver medalist(s)	Anna Järvinen	1:35.0
3rd place, bronze medalist(s)	Elina Savelainen	1:47.0

==== 500 metre freestyle ====
Competed in Vyborg on 23 July 1921.

Rank	Name	Time
1st place, gold medalist(s)	Liisa Lehmus	9:45.3 NR
2nd place, silver medalist(s)	Mary Lindberg	10:11.3
3rd place, bronze medalist(s)	Inkeri Kaltto	10:37.6

==== 100 metre breaststroke ====
Competed in Vyborg on 24 July 1921.

Rank	Name	Time
1st place, gold medalist(s)	Liisa Lehmus	1:40.7
2nd place, silver medalist(s)	Mary Lindberg	1:47.0
3rd place, bronze medalist(s)	Ester Lehmus	1:50.0
4	Hilda Kuusela	?

==== 4 × 50 metre freestyle relay ====
Competed in Vyborg on 23 July 1921.

Rank	Club	Team	Time
1st place, gold medalist(s)	Viipurin Uimaseura (I)	Arla Salonius, Elvi Väkevä, Liisa Lehmus, Elin Väkevä	2:39.0 NR
2nd place, silver medalist(s)	Helsingin Uimarit	Hellin Kahila, Hilda Kuusela, Helvi Mäkinen, Anna Järvinen	2:44.1
3rd place, bronze medalist(s)	Viipurin Uimaseura (II)	Markkanen, Inkeri Kaltto, Elina Savelainen, Uimi	3:07.2

== Water polo ==
=== Men ===
- semi-finals:
  - Helsinki, 3 August 1921: Helsingfors Simsällskap–Helsingin Uimarit 6–2
  - Tampere, 14 August 1921: Tampereen Uimaseura–Viipurin Uimaseura 6–1
- final:
  - Helsinki, 21 August 1921: Helsingfors Simsällskap–Tampereen Uimaseura 8–0

== Sources ==
- Teräsvirta, Paavo, ed. (1956). Suomen uimaliitto. Finska simförbundet. 1906–1956 (in Finnish). Helsinki: Finnish Swimming Federation. pp. 154–159.
