= 1906 Finnish championships in aquatics =

From 1906 to 1926, the Finnish Swimming Federation did not arrange a dedicated national competition, but spread out the hosting duties of the championship events to multiple clubs.

== Diving ==
=== Men ===
==== Plain ====
Competed in Helsinki on 2 September 1906.

Rank	Name	Score
1st place, gold medalist(s)	Bernhard Fredriksson	115.5 points
2nd place, silver medalist(s)	Rudolf Eriksson	108.5 points
3rd place, bronze medalist(s)	W. Sundman	107.5 points
4	Toivo Aro	107.0 points
5	Bruno Rosenbröijer	106.5 points
6	Gunnar Ahlblad	103.5 points
7	Artur Wetzell	103.0 points
8	Oskar Wetzell	89.5 points
9	E. Martikainen	88.0 points

=== Women ===
==== Platform ====
Competed in Helsinki on 2 September 1906.

Rank	Name	Score
1st place, gold medalist(s)	Valborg Florström	101.5 points
2nd place, silver medalist(s)	Maria Henell	97.5 points

== Swimming ==
=== Men ===
==== 100 metre freestyle ====
Competed in Vaasa on 28 July 1906.

Rank	Name	Time
1st place, gold medalist(s)	Herman Cederberg	1:26.2 NR
2nd place, silver medalist(s)	K. Salmi	1:29.4
3rd place, bronze medalist(s)	Aimo Malmberg	1:29.8
4	Wolter Bremer	1:31.0
5	John Henriksson	1:31.3
6	L. Jääskeläinen	1:31.5
7	J. Malmivaara	1:32.7
8	Hugo Jonsson	1:32.8
9	L. Kemiläinen	1:33.3
10	Y. Andersson	1:34.2
11	Gunnar Ahlblad	1:37.8
12	P. Lyly	1:45.2

==== 1000 metre freestyle ====
Competed in Vaasa on 29 July 1906.

Rank	Name	Time
1st place, gold medalist(s)	Herman Cederberg	17:54.6 NR
2nd place, silver medalist(s)	Aimo Malmberg	19:21.8
3rd place, bronze medalist(s)	Hugo Jonsson	19:34.2
4	J. Malmivaara	19:43.0
5	A. Barsokewitsch	20:14.4
6	A. Lindholm	20:34.4
7	K. Salmi	21:09.4
8	Väinö Siro	22:39.0

==== 200 metre breaststroke ====
Competed in Vaasa on 28 July 1906.

Rank	Name	Time
1st place, gold medalist(s)	Herman Cederberg	3:06.8 NR
2nd place, silver medalist(s)	Aimo Malmberg	3:16.9
3rd place, bronze medalist(s)	Hugo Jonsson	3:24.5
4	A. Lindholm	3:26.7
5	J. Malmivaara	3:29.1
6	Gunnar Ahlblad	3:31.0
7	John Henriksson	3:31.6
8	Eino Karjalainen	3:37.8
9	Arvid Rydman	3:39.0
10	Y. Andersson	3:41.1
11	A. Kemppainen	3:44.6
12	K. Aaltonen	3:49.2
13	Väinö Siro	3:51.0

Cederberg's time would have been the world record later when FINA was founded, but they refused to ratify it because he wore swimming briefs instead of a racing suit.

=== Women ===
==== 100 metre freestyle ====
Competed in Helsinki on 22 July 1906.

Rank	Name	Time
1st place, gold medalist(s)	Elsa Lingonblad	1:51.4 NR
2nd place, silver medalist(s)	Anna Björkman	1:51.4
3rd place, bronze medalist(s)	Elin Westerberg	2:03.4
4	Dagmar Kneckt	2:08.7

Elsa Lingonblad became the first to win an official Finnish championship in aquatics.

== Sources ==
- Teräsvirta, Paavo, ed. (1956). Suomen uimaliitto. Finska simförbundet. 1906–1956 (in Finnish). Helsinki: Finnish Swimming Federation. pp. 154–159.
