= 1908 Finnish championships in aquatics =

From 1906 to 1926, the Finnish Swimming Federation did not arrange a dedicated national competition, but spread out the hosting duties of the championship events to multiple clubs.

== Diving ==
=== Men ===
==== Plain ====
Competed in Turku on 26 July 1908.

Rank	Name	Score
1st place, gold medalist(s)	Eino Karjalainen	111.50 points
2nd place, silver medalist(s)	Einar Flinkenberg	106.75 points
3rd place, bronze medalist(s)	Arvid Rydman	100.75 points
4	Gunnar Ahlblad	100.50 points
5	Artur Wetzell	100.25 points

==== Springboard ====
Competed in Helsinki on 8 August 1908.

Rank	Name	Placing figure	Score
1st place, gold medalist(s)	Oskar Wetzell	3	227.0 points
2nd place, silver medalist(s)	W. Ullström	6	203.0 points
3rd place, bronze medalist(s)	Leo Suni	9	161.0 points
4	S. Olin	13	156.0 points
5	L. Itkonen	14	142.3 points

=== Women ===
==== Platform ====
Competed in Tampere on 16 August 1908.

Rank	Name	Score
1st place, gold medalist(s)	Valborg Florström	112.9

== Swimming ==
=== Men ===
==== 100 metre freestyle ====
Competed in Helsinki on 8 (heats) and 9 (final) August 1908.

===== Heats =====
Three fastest times qualified for the final.

Rank	Name	Time
1	Väinö Vanhala	1:25.2 NR
2	K. Ekholm	1:26.0
3	W. Finnberg	1:26.1
4	Jussi Kahma	1:26.4
5	K. Salmi	1:30.5
6	S. Strömberg	1:31.2

===== Final =====
Rank	Name	Time
1st place, gold medalist(s)	W. Finnberg	1:27.3
2nd place, silver medalist(s)	K. Ekholm	1:27.4
3rd place, bronze medalist(s)	Väinö Vanhala	1:28.0

==== 1000 metre freestyle ====
Competed in Helsinki on 9 August 1908.

Rank	Name	Time
1st place, gold medalist(s)	Jarl Wasström	17:57.4
2nd place, silver medalist(s)	Erkki Ojanen	18:32.6
3rd place, bronze medalist(s)	Kalle Aaltonen	19:06.8
4	Hugo Jonsson	19:22.6

==== 200 metre breaststroke ====
Competed in Tampere on 16 August 1908.

Rank	Name	Time
1st place, gold medalist(s)	Kalle Aaltonen	3:28.2
2nd place, silver medalist(s)	Erkki Ojanen	3:32.3
3rd place, bronze medalist(s)	Eino Lehtinen	3:32.7
4	Paul Fritsch	3:34.2
5	Kyösti Järvinen	3:39.9
6	Väinö Siro	3:43.2
7	Arvo Aaltonen	3:46.1

==== 100 metre life saving ====
Competed in Vaasa on 1 August 1908.

Rank	Name	Time
1st place, gold medalist(s)	Herman Cederberg	2:16.3
2nd place, silver medalist(s)	Hugo Jonsson	2:29.6
3rd place, bronze medalist(s)	S. Strömberg	2:31.5
4	A. Ohls	3:01.6

==== 4 × 50 metre freestyle relay ====
Competed in Vaasa on 1 August 1908.

Rank	Club	Team	Time
1st place, gold medalist(s)	Vaasan Uimaseura	Wolter Bremer, Herman Cederberg, Jussi Kahma, John Henriksson	2:34.6
2nd place, silver medalist(s)	Helsingfors Simsällskap	K. Salmi, Hugo Jonsson, S. Strömberg, Toivo Aro	2:41.6

=== Women ===
==== 100 metre freestyle ====
Competed in Turku on 26 July 1908.

Rank	Name	Time
1st place, gold medalist(s)	Anna Björkman	1:51.1
2nd place, silver medalist(s)	Ragnhild Säll	1:51.8
3rd place, bronze medalist(s)	Maria Henell	1:57.7
4	Magda Westerholm	2:02.0

== Water polo ==
=== Men ===
Competed in Helsinki on 9 August 1908. Championship was decided by a single match, won by Helsingfors Simsällskap 7–1 (3–1, 4–0).

Rank	Club	Team
1st place, gold medalist(s)	Helsingfors Simsällskap	Strömberg (6 goals), Jansson (1 goal), ?
2nd place, silver medalist(s)	Helsingfors Idrottsklubben	Jarl Wasström (1 goal), ?

== Sources ==
- Teräsvirta, Paavo, ed. (1956). Suomen uimaliitto. Finska simförbundet. 1906–1956 (in Finnish). Helsinki: Finnish Swimming Federation. pp. 154–159.
