= 1913 Finnish championships in aquatics =

From 1906 to 1926, the Finnish Swimming Federation did not arrange a dedicated national competition, but spread out the hosting duties of the championship events to multiple clubs.

== Diving ==
=== Men ===
==== Plain ====
Competed in Hanko on 10 August 1913.

Rank	Name	Placing figure	Score
1st place, gold medalist(s)	O. Nenonen	4	98.75 points
2nd place, silver medalist(s)	Leo Suni	5	97.50 points
3rd place, bronze medalist(s)	Yrjö Valkama	9	86.25 points
4	H. Henriksson	12	76.25 points

==== Platform ====
Competed in Helsinki on 2 August 1913.

Rank	Name	Placing figure	Score
1st place, gold medalist(s)	Oskar Wetzell	4	313.60 points
2nd place, silver medalist(s)	Leo Suni	8	295.40 points
3rd place, bronze medalist(s)	O. Nenonen	12	275.83 points

==== Springboard ====
Competed in Helsinki on 3 August 1913.

Rank	Name	Placing figure	Score
1st place, gold medalist(s)	Oskar Wetzell	4	310.24 points
2nd place, silver medalist(s)	Albert Nyman	8	288.68 points
3rd place, bronze medalist(s)	O. Nenonen	12	254.18 points

=== Women ===
==== Platform ====
Competed in Helsinki on 3 August 1913.

Rank	Name	Placing figure	Score
1st place, gold medalist(s)	Vieno Lind	5	173.0 points
2nd place, silver medalist(s)	Anna Järvinen	14	157.5 points
3rd place, bronze medalist(s)	Senni Aaltonen	14	156.0 points
4	Julia Leibovitsch	17	146.0 points
5	Hilda Kuusela	25	135.5 points

== Swimming ==
=== Men ===
==== 100 metre freestyle ====
Competed in Vaasa on 27 July 1913.

Rank	Name	Time
1st place, gold medalist(s)	Jussi Kahma	1:11.0 NR
2nd place, silver medalist(s)	Yrjö Seuderling	1:14.6

==== 500 metre freestyle ====
Competed in Turku on 10 August 1913.

Rank	Name	Time
1st place, gold medalist(s)	Martti Salokannel	8:03.5
2nd place, silver medalist(s)	Arvo Aaltonen	8:22.2
3rd place, bronze medalist(s)	B. Lilius	8:57.1

==== 1000 metre freestyle ====
Competed in Tampere on 25 August 1913.

Rank	Name	Time
1st place, gold medalist(s)	Martti Salokannel	17:38.0 NR
2nd place, silver medalist(s)	Vilhelm Lindgrén	18:56.8
3rd place, bronze medalist(s)	Aaro Tynell	19:27.0
4	J. Valovuori	19:51.7

==== 100 metre backstroke ====
Competed in Pori on 16 August 1913.

Rank	Name	Time
1st place, gold medalist(s)	W. Sjöholm	1:43.1
2nd place, silver medalist(s)	J. Viklund	1:49.2

==== 100 metre breaststroke ====
Competed in Tampere on 24 August 1913.

Rank	Name	Time
1st place, gold medalist(s)	Vilhelm Lindgrén	1:22.5 NR
2nd place, silver medalist(s)	Martti Sjöholm	1:24.1
3rd place, bronze medalist(s)	A. Viklund	1:24.1
4	Väinö Warelius	1:24.9
5	Herman Cederberg	1:27.3
6	Mantere	1:34.1
7	Aaro Tynell	1:35.4

==== 200 metre breaststroke ====
Competed in Turku on 10 August 1913.

Rank	Name	Time
1st place, gold medalist(s)	Arvo Aaltonen	3:01.6 NR
2nd place, silver medalist(s)	Vilhelm Lindgrén	3:11.4

==== 400 metre breaststroke ====
Competed in Pori on 16 August 1913.

Rank	Name	Time
1st place, gold medalist(s)	Arvo Aaltonen	6:25.4
2nd place, silver medalist(s)	Martti Sjölholm	7:28.9
3rd place, bronze medalist(s)	Lauri Aaltonen	8:00.1

Arvo Aaltonen's time broke the Finnish record, but could not be ratified because it was swum in a river.

==== 100 metre life saving ====
Competed in Pori on 17 August 1913.

Rank	Name	Time
1st place, gold medalist(s)	Yrjö Seuderling	1:46.8
2nd place, silver medalist(s)	Herman Cederberg	1:53.0
3rd place, bronze medalist(s)	Arvo Aaltonen	2:12.2
4	V. Sjöholm	2:32.0

Seuderling's time broke the Finnish record, but could not be ratified because it was swum in a river.

==== 4 × 50 metre freestyle relay ====
Competed in Vaasa on 27 July 1913.

Rank	Club	Team	Time
1st place, gold medalist(s)	Vaasan Uimaseura	Martti Salokannel, Uuno Mäkipää, Jussi Kahma, Artturi Helenius	2:07.3 NR
2nd place, silver medalist(s)	Helsingfors Simsällskapet	H. Vasenius, V. Sjöholm, L. Stenij, F. Sjöström	2:17.2

=== Women ===
==== 50 metre freestyle ====
Competed in Helsinki on 2 August 1913.

Rank	Name	Time
1st place, gold medalist(s)	Lilly Blomster	41.3
2nd place, silver medalist(s)	Hilda Kuusela	42.0
3rd place, bronze medalist(s)	Anna Järvinen	45.0
4	Sofia Gylling	45.3
5	Edith Johansson	46.4
6	Greta Lind	46.7
7	Vieno Lind	47.6
8	Laura Laaksonen	48.7
9	Olga Koistinen	49.2
10	Eva Brander	50.0
11	Helmi Ojander	50.4

==== 100 metre freestyle ====
Competed in Helsinki on 3 August 1913.

Rank	Name	Time
1st place, gold medalist(s)	Anna Järvinen	1:43.0
2nd place, silver medalist(s)	Hilda Kuusela	1:44.9
3rd place, bronze medalist(s)	Lilly Blomster	1:46.8
4	Olga Koistinen	2:03.1
5	Sofia Gylling	2:11.4
6	Edith Grönholm	2:12.2

== Water polo ==
=== Men ===
Competed in Tampere.

Rank	Club	Team
1st place, gold medalist(s)	Helsingfors Simsällskap	?
AC	Hämeenlinnan Uimaseura	?
AC	Tampereen Uimaseura	?
AC	Turun Uimaseura	Eero Ek, ?

Matches:

- on 24 August 1913:
  - Tampereen Uimaseura won Hämeenlinnan Uimaseura 5–0
- on 25 August 1913:
  - Helsingfors Simsällskap won Turun Uimaseura 1–0 (1–0, 0–0)
  - Helsingfors Simsällskap won Tampereen Uimaseura by forfeit
  - Turun Uimaseura won Tampereen Uimaseura by forfeit

== Sources ==
- Teräsvirta, Paavo, ed. (1956). Suomen uimaliitto. Finska simförbundet. 1906–1956 (in Finnish). Helsinki: Finnish Swimming Federation. pp. 154–159.
