= 1909 Finnish championships in aquatics =

From 1906 to 1926, the Finnish Swimming Federation did not arrange a dedicated national competition, but spread out the hosting duties of the championship events to multiple clubs.

== Diving ==
=== Men ===
==== Plain ====
Competed in Vaasa on 24 July 1909.

Rank	Name	Placing figure	Score
1st place, gold medalist(s)	Jarl Bjelke	3	106.75 points
2nd place, silver medalist(s)	Toivo Aro	7	102.25 points
3rd place, bronze medalist(s)	Oskar Wetzell	8	97.00 points

==== Platform ====
Competed in Vaasa on 25 July 1909.

Rank	Name	Placing figure	Score
1st place, gold medalist(s)	Oskar Wetzell	3	71.38 points
2nd place, silver medalist(s)	Toivo Aro	6	62.35 points

==== Springboard ====
Competed in Vaasa on 25 July 1909.

Rank	Name	Placing figure	Score
1st place, gold medalist(s)	Oskar Wetzell	3	70.50 points
2nd place, silver medalist(s)	A. Backman	7	56.85 points
3rd place, bronze medalist(s)	F. Wester	8	56.60 points

=== Women ===
==== Platform ====
Competed in Turku on 1 August 1909.

Rank	Name	Score
1st place, gold medalist(s)	Valborg Florström	104 points
2nd place, silver medalist(s)	Anna Björkman	103 points

== Swimming ==
=== Men ===
==== 100 metre freestyle ====
Competed in Vaasa on 24 July 1909.

Rank	Name	Time
1st place, gold medalist(s)	Artturi Helenius	1:19.6 NR
2nd place, silver medalist(s)	Wolter Bremer	1:24.2
3rd place, bronze medalist(s)	Jussi Kahma	1:24.6
4	E. Johansson	1:29.1

==== 1000 metre freestyle ====
Competed in Vaasa on 24 July 1909.

Rank	Name	Time
1st place, gold medalist(s)	Jarl Wasström	19:09.3
2nd place, silver medalist(s)	J. Hietala	21:08.0
3rd place, bronze medalist(s)	A. Ohls	21:32.2
4	J. Svenn	24:32.2

==== 200 metre breaststroke ====
Competed in Tampere on 22 August 1909.

Rank	Name	Time
1st place, gold medalist(s)	Arvo Aaltonen	3:08.0
1st place, gold medalist(s)	Kyösti Järvinen	3:08.0
3rd place, bronze medalist(s)	Herman Cederberg	3:10.5

According to official rules, the competition should have been swam off instead of splitting the championship.

==== 100 metre life saving ====
Competed in Tampere on 22 August 1909.

Rank	Name	Time
1st place, gold medalist(s)	Elis Johansson	2:14.2
2nd place, silver medalist(s)	K. Siro	2:17.1
3rd place, bronze medalist(s)	Jarl Wasström	2:32.9

==== 4 × 50 metre freestyle relay ====
Competed in Tampere on 22 August 1909.

Rank	Club	Team	Time
1st place, gold medalist(s)	Vaasan Uimaseura	Wolter Bremer, W. Bjelke, Jussi Kahma, Artturi Helenius	2:17.0 NR
2nd place, silver medalist(s)	Tampereen Uimaseura	Väinö Siro, Elis Sivén, Laaksonen, Kalle Aaltonen	2:53.7

=== Women ===
==== 100 metre freestyle ====
Competed in Turku on 1 August 1909.

Rank	Name	Time
1st place, gold medalist(s)	Anna Björkman	1:46.4 NR
2nd place, silver medalist(s)	Regina Kari	1:49.7
3rd place, bronze medalist(s)	Toini Nurmi	1:54.7
4	Olga Haapanen	1:56.0
5	Hulda Helenius	1:59.0

== Water polo ==
=== Men ===
Competed in Turku on 1 August 1909.

Rank	Club	Team
1st place, gold medalist(s)	Helsingfors Simsällskap	?
2nd place, silver medalist(s)	Turun Urheilun Ystävät	A. Ek, Yrjö Seuderling, ?

Championship was decided by a single match, won by Helsingfors Simsällskap 6–0 (1–0, 5–0).

== Sources ==
- Teräsvirta, Paavo, ed. (1956). Suomen uimaliitto. Finska simförbundet. 1906–1956 (in Finnish). Helsinki: Finnish Swimming Federation. pp. 154–159.
