= 1914 Finnish championships in aquatics =

From 1906 to 1926, the Finnish Swimming Federation did not arrange a dedicated national competition, but spread out the hosting duties of the championship events to multiple clubs.

Few of the championship events were held before the opening of the World War I prompted the federation to cancel them.

== Diving ==
=== Men ===
==== Plain ====
Competed in Helsinki on 2 August 1914.

Rank	Name	Placing figure	Score
1st place, gold medalist(s)	Yrjö Valkama	4	103.50 points
2nd place, silver medalist(s)	K. Vähämäki	5	103.00 points
3rd place, bronze medalist(s)	Kalle Kainuvaara	9	97.25 points
4	Wickström	14	93.75 points
5	H. Wasenius	14	93.00 points
6	Hugo Koivuniemi	17	90.00 points
7	W. Alajääski	21	87.25 points
8	O. Nenonen	23	81.75 points
9	V. Nordlund	27	74.75 points

== Swimming ==
=== Men ===
==== 100 metre freestyle ====
Competed in Helsinki on 2 August 1914.

Rank	Name	Time
1st place, gold medalist(s)	Jussi Kahma	1:12.6
2nd place, silver medalist(s)	I. Sjöström	1:13.6
3rd place, bronze medalist(s)	Yrjö Seuderling	1:13.6
4	Uuno Mäkipää	1:14.4
5	L. Heinonen	1:18.4
6	K. Alho	1:20.3

==== 500 metre freestyle ====
Competed in Helsinki on 2 August 1914.

Rank	Name	Time
1st place, gold medalist(s)	Aaro Tynell	8:45.9
2nd place, silver medalist(s)	J. Tiiainen	8:55.0

==== 100 metre backstroke ====
Competed in Helsinki on 1 August 1914.

Rank	Name	Time
1st place, gold medalist(s)	E. Ahlgren	1:43.8
2nd place, silver medalist(s)	Arvo Aaltonen	1:45.9
3rd place, bronze medalist(s)	I. Löfgren	1:46.7
4	August Lindberg	1:48.7
5	E. Jansson	1:50.9
6	P. Johansson	1:51.8

==== 100 metre breaststroke ====
Competed in Helsinki on 1 August 1914.

Rank	Name	Time
1st place, gold medalist(s)	Vilhelm Lindgrén	1:25.1
2nd place, silver medalist(s)	Arvo Aaltonen	1:25.8
3rd place, bronze medalist(s)	Martti Sjöholm	1:27.8

==== 200 metre breaststroke ====
Competed in Helsinki on 2 August 1914.

Rank	Name	Time
1st place, gold medalist(s)	Vilhelm Lindgrén	3:12.0
2nd place, silver medalist(s)	Arvo Aaltonen	3:12.6
3rd place, bronze medalist(s)	Aaro Tynell	3:13.1
4	Martti Sjöholm	3:27.8

==== 400 metre breaststroke ====
Competed in Helsinki on 1 August 1914.

Rank	Name	Time
1st place, gold medalist(s)	Arvo Aaltonen	7:10.1
2nd place, silver medalist(s)	Aaro Tynell	7:12.0

==== 4 × 50 metre freestyle relay ====
Competed in Helsinki on 2 August 1914.

Rank	Club	Team	Time
1st place, gold medalist(s)	Vaasan Uimaseura	Y. Snellman, Uuno Mäkipää, Jussi Kahma, Artturi Helenius	2:06.8 NR
2nd place, silver medalist(s)	Turun Uimaseura	Eino Lähteinen, Väinö Hannula, August Lindberg, Yrjö Seuderling	2:09.8
3rd place, bronze medalist(s)	Helsingfors Simsällskapet	K. Alho, L. Saastamoinen, H. Wasenius, I. Sjöström	2:11.0
4	Kotkan Uimaseura	O. Granfeldt, Kalle Kainuvaara, Emil Hagelberg, Martti Salokannel	2:22.0

== Sources ==
- Teräsvirta, Paavo, ed. (1956). Suomen uimaliitto. Finska simförbundet. 1906–1956 (in Finnish). Helsinki: Finnish Swimming Federation. pp. 154–159.
