= Toivo Aro =

Finnish diver (1887–1962)

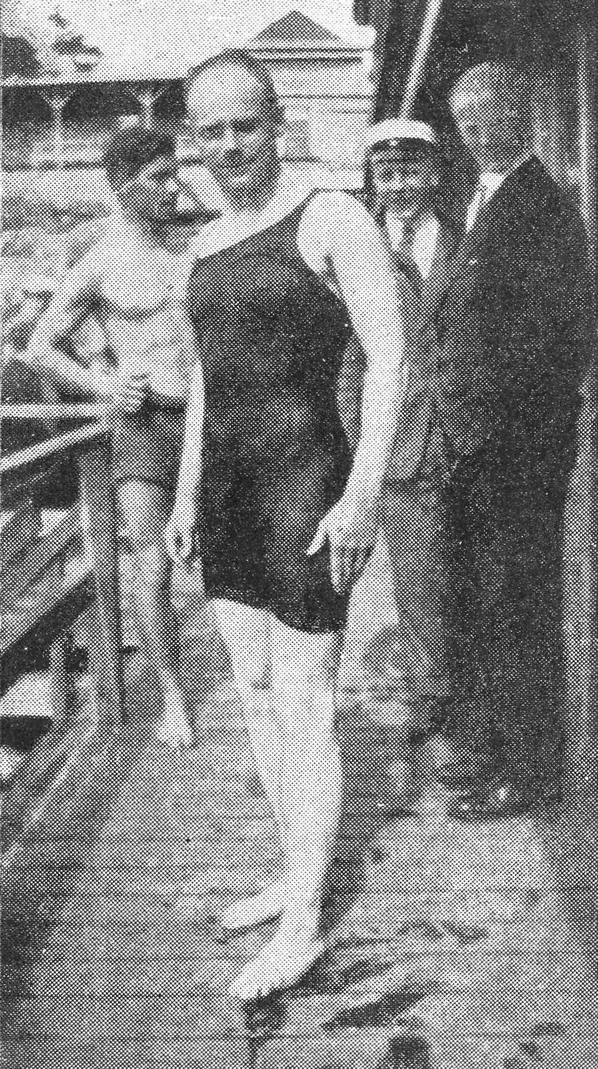
- Aro during his competitive years

Personal information
- Full name: Toivo Nestori Aro
- National team: Finland
- Born: Toivo Nestori Ahlstedt; 9 February 1887 Helsinki, Grand Duchy of Finland, Russian Empire
- Died: 8 October 1962 (aged 75) Helsinki, Finland
- Resting place: Hietaniemi Cemetery, Helsinki
- Education: Master of Philosophy
- Occupation(s): bank manager, chief executive officer
- Spouse: Katri Lille

Sport
- Sport: Aquatics
- Events: Diving; Water polo
- Club: Helsingfors Simsällskap; Helsingin Hiihtäjät; Helsingin Itäreitin Melojat; Helsingin Luistelijat; Helsingin Uimarit; Norssin Turnarit; Suomalainen Pursiseura; Ylioppilasvoimistelijat

Achievements and titles
- National finals: 10 Finnish championships in aquatics

Toivo Nestori Aro (born Toivo Nestori Ahlstedt, 9 February 1887 – 8 October 1962) was a Finnish sports leader and an aquatics athlete who won 10 Finnish championships.

== Sports ==
=== Olympic participation ===
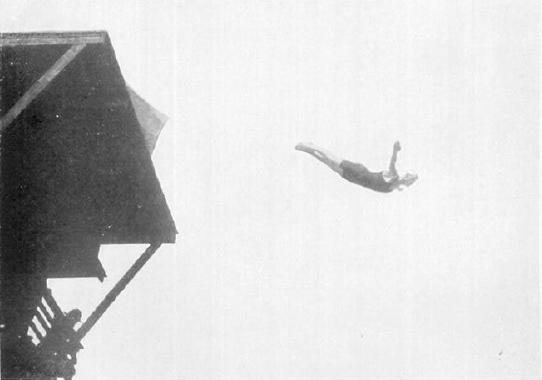
Toivo Aro at the 1912 Olympics

Toivo Aro at the Olympic Games
Games	Event	Stage	Rank	Notes
1908 Summer Olympics	10 metre platform	Round one	2nd in heat	Advanced to semi-final.
1908 Summer Olympics	10 metre platform	Semi-final	3rd in heat	Did not advance to final. According to the official histories of the Finnish Swimming Federation, Aro did qualify for the final, but due to confusion and a language barrier he sat it out as a spectator. The books offer as evidence a diploma presented exclusively to the finalists. Aro himself disputed this in an article he wrote, having no feelings of injustice and naming three other non-finalists who received the diploma.
1912 Summer Olympics	10 metre platform	Round one	3rd in heat	Advanced to final
1912 Summer Olympics	10 metre platform	Final	8th	
1912 Summer Olympics	Plain high diving	Round one	2nd in heat	Advanced to final
1912 Summer Olympics	Plain high diving	Final	5th	

Aro was the Chef de Mission of Finland at the 1928 Winter Olympics. He was the leader of Finland's swimming team at the 1924 and 1936 Summer Olympics. In 1924, he was also a diving judge.

=== National athlete ===
Aro won ten Finnish national championship golds in aquatics:

- plain diving: 1907, 1910, 1911 and 1912
- platform diving: 1910 and 1912
- water polo: 1909, 1911, 1913
- 4 × 50 metre freestyle relay: 1907

He was a member of eight clubs, all Helsinki-based:

- Helsingfors Simsällskap. Board member in 1913–1915. Honorary member since 1937.
- Helsingin Hiihtäjät. Founding member.
- Helsingin Itäreitin Melojat. Founding member.
- Helsingin Luistelijat. Founding member.
- Helsingin Uimarit. Founding and honorary member.
- Norssin Turnarit
- Suomalainen Pursiseura. Honorary member.
- Ylioppilasvoimistelijat

=== Sportsleader ===
Aro was a board member of the International Ski Federation in 1926–1930.

He was the chairman of the Finnish Ski Association in 1916–1926.

He was a board member of Finnish Olympic Committee in 1919–1946 and its treasurer in 1929–1957.

He was the chairman of the Finnish Swimming Federation in 1928–1946 and its honorary chairman.

He was the progenitor of the Yrjönkatu Swimming Hall, the first public indoor swimming hall in Finland.

He was the founding member of Suomen Latu, a national non-profit organisation for promoting outdoor recreation and physical activities, and its inaugural chairman in 1938.

He was active in many other notable Finnish sports organizations in the 1920s and 1930s.

== Other ==
Aro was born and died in Helsinki. His parents were Henrik Gustav Aro Ahlstedt and Mariaana Karoliina Forsell. They Finnicized their family name from Ahlstedt to Aro on 12 May 1906.

He married dentist Katri Lille (1890–) in 1916. They had six children:

1. Toivo Ilmari (1917–), who acted in various positions in sport in Finland
2. Uhmo Antamo (1919–)
3. Kauko Kalervo (1920–1932)
4. Sorri Uskali (1922–)
5. Heljä Iloisa Katri (1926–), who married Yrjö Heikki Soininvaara (born Sirén) (1924–) in 1948. Osmo Soininvaara is their son.
6. Marja Terttu Tellervo (1928–)

He was the chief executive officer of the bank Helsingin Suomalainen Säästöpankki in 1925–1957.

He was the editor-in-chief of Urheilulehti in 1917–1918. He wrote some works, such as a fifty-year history of Helsingin Suomalainen Säästöpankki, banking-related manuals, sport and temperance movement histories.

He was awarded the Knight of the White Rose of Finland. His wife received the Commemorative medal of the Winter War.
