= Swimming at the 1924 Summer Olympics – Men's 200 metre breaststroke =

Men's 200 metre breaststroke at the Games of the VIII Olympiad
- Venue: Piscine des Tourelles
- Date: 15 July 1924 (heats); 16 July 1924 (semifinals); 17 July 1924 (final)
- Competitors: 28 from 16 nations
- Winning time: 2.56.6

Medalists
1st place, gold medalist(s)		Bob Skelton; United States
2nd place, silver medalist(s)		Joseph De Combe; Belgium
3rd place, bronze medalist(s)		Bill Kirschbaum; United States

The men's 200 metre breaststroke was a swimming event held as part of the swimming at the 1924 Summer Olympics programme. It was the fourth appearance of the event, which was established in 1908. The competition was held on Tuesday July 15, 1924, on Wednesday July 16, 1924, and on Thursday July 17, 1924.

Despite Erich Rademacher from Germany being arguably the fastest breaststroker in the world at the time, and holding the world record in the event, he was not able to compete due to Germany's role in WWI. Despite this, he would establish his dominance in the event by beating the world record several times, which was over 5 seconds faster than the Olympic record set in this event.

== Records ==
These were the standing world and Olympic records (in minutes) prior to the 1924 Summer Olympics.

World record	2:50.4	(Germany) Erich Rademacher	Magdeburg (GER)	April 7, 1924
Olympic record	3:01.8	(Germany) Walter Bathe	Stockholm (SWE)	July 12, 1912

In the first heat Bob Skelton set a new Olympic record with 2:56.0 minutes.

== Results ==
=== Heats ===
Tuesday July 15, 1924: The fastest two in each heat and the fastest third-placed from across the heats advanced.

Heat 1

Place	Swimmer	Time	Qual.
1	Bob Skelton (USA)	2:56.0	QQ OR
2	Thor Henning (SWE)	3:02.4	QQ
3	Zoltán Bitskey (HUN)	3:05.4	qq
4	Ivan Stedman (AUS)	3:09.6	
5	William Stoney (GBR)	3:10.3	
6	Georges Vallerey (FRA)	3:11.2	

Heat 2

Place	Swimmer	Time	Qual.
1	Joseph De Combe (BEL)	3:02.0	QQ
2	Edward Maw (GBR)	3:07.0	QQ
3	Márton Sipos (HUN)	3:09.8	
4	Arvo Aaltonen (FIN)	3:11.0	
5	Marius Zwiller (FRA)	3:11.2	

Heat 3

Place	Swimmer	Time	Qual.
1	Bill Kirschbaum (USA)	3:01.0	QQ
2	Rudolf Piowatý (TCH)	3:10.8	QQ
3	Bo Johnsson (SWE)	3:12.2	
4	Viljo Viklund (FIN)	3:12.4	
5	Luciano Trolli (ITA)	3:23.0	

Heat 4

Place	Swimmer	Time	Qual.
1	Reginald Flint (GBR)	3:05.2	QQ
2	Frigyes Hollósi (HUN)	3:06.4	QQ
3	Henri Bouvier (FRA)	3:07.8	
4	Gerlacus Moes (NED)	3:18.8	
5	Emerico Biach (ITA)	3:26.8	
6	Ivo Pavelić (YUG)	3:28.4	

Heat 5

Place	Swimmer	Time	Qual.
1	Bengt Linders (SWE)	3:03.4	QQ
2	Robert Wyss (SUI)	3:03.6	QQ
3	Clarrie Heard (NZL)	3:09.0	
4	Tsunenobu Ishida (JPN)	3:09.2	
5	Jaroslav Müller (TCH)	3:22.0	
6	Mário Marques (POR)	3:32.4	

=== Semifinals ===
Wednesday July 16, 1924: The fastest two in each semi-final and the faster of the two third-placed swimmer advanced to the final.

Semifinal 1

Place	Swimmer	Time	Qual.
1	Bob Skelton (USA)	3:00.2	QF
2	Bill Kirschbaum (USA)	3:02.6	QF
3	Robert Wyss (SUI)	3:04.2	qf
4	Frigyes Hollósi (HUN)	3:05.6	
5	Reginald Flint (GBR)	3:06.8	
6	Rudolf Piowatý (TCH)	3:11.8	

Semifinal 2

Place	Swimmer	Time	Qual.
1	Joseph De Combe (BEL)	3:00.2	QF
2	Bengt Linders (SWE)	3:01.4	QF
3	Thor Henning (SWE)	3:05.0	
4	Edward Maw (GBR)	3:07.0	
5	Zoltán Bitskey (HUN)	3:09.2	

=== Final ===
Thursday July 17, 1924:

Place	Swimmer	Time
1	Bob Skelton (USA)	2:56.6
2	Joseph De Combe (BEL)	2:59.2
3	Bill Kirschbaum (USA)	3:01.0
4	Bengt Linders (SWE)	3:02.2
5	Robert Wyss (SUI)	3:05.6
