= Finnish Swimming Federation =

Finnish sports governing body

- Suomen Uimaliitto
- Finska Simförbundet
- Sport: swimming, water polo, synchronised swimming, diving and open water swimming
- Founded: 1906
- Affiliation: International Swimming Federation (FINA); European Swimming League (LEN)
- Location: Helsinki, Finland
- President: Sami Wahlman

Official website
- www.uimaliitto.fi/en/

The Finnish Swimming Federation (Finnish: Suomen Uimaliitto, Swedish: Finska Simförbundet, officially Suomen Uimaliitto – Finska Simförbundet r.y.) is the national governing body of swimming, water polo, synchronised swimming, diving and open water swimming in Finland. It is one of the founding members of FINA. It is also a member of LEN and the Finnish Olympic Committee.

== Finnish championships ==
- 1906 Finnish championships in aquatics
- 1907 Finnish championships in aquatics
- 1908 Finnish championships in aquatics
- 1909 Finnish championships in aquatics
- 1910 Finnish championships in aquatics
- 1911 Finnish championships in aquatics
- 1912 Finnish championships in aquatics
- 1913 Finnish championships in aquatics
- 1914 Finnish championships in aquatics
- 1915 Finnish championships in aquatics
- 1916 Finnish championships in aquatics
- 1917 Finnish championships in aquatics
- 1918 Finnish championships in aquatics
- 1919 Finnish championships in aquatics
- 1920 Finnish championships in aquatics
- 1921 Finnish championships in aquatics
- 1922 Finnish championships in aquatics
