= Bob Skelton =

Bob Skelton may refer to:

- Bob Skelton (jockey) (1934–2016), jockey in New Zealand and Australian Thoroughbred horse racing
- Bob Skelton (swimmer) (1903–1977), American swimmer
