= Márton Sipos =

Hungarian swimmer (1900–1926)

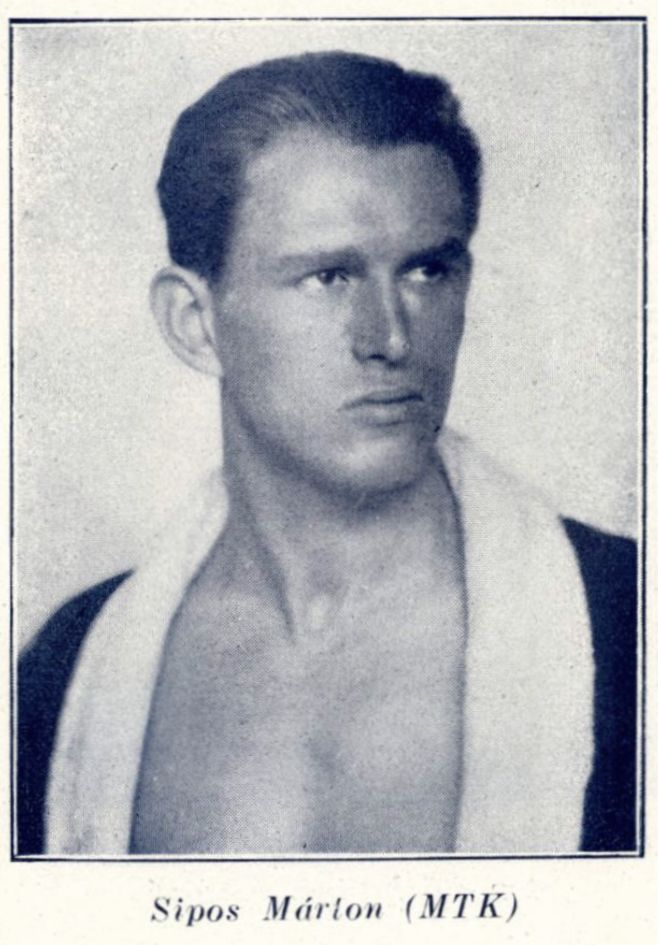

Personal information
- Born: 19 January 1900 Szekszárd, Austria-Hungary
- Died: 11 December 1926 (aged 26) Budapest, Kingdom of Hungary

Sport
- Sport: Swimming

Márton Sipos (19 January 1900 – 11 December 1926) was a Hungarian swimmer. He competed in the men's 200 metre breaststroke event at the 1924 Summer Olympics.
