= Mário Marques =

Portuguese swimmer (1901–1989)

Personal information
- Born: 23 September 1901
- Died: 1989 (aged 87–88)

Sport
- Sport: Swimming

Mário Marques (23 September 1901 – 1989) was a Portuguese breaststroke swimmer. He competed in the men's 200 metre breaststroke event at the 1924 Summer Olympics.
