= Bob Skelton (swimmer) =

American swimmer (1903–1977)

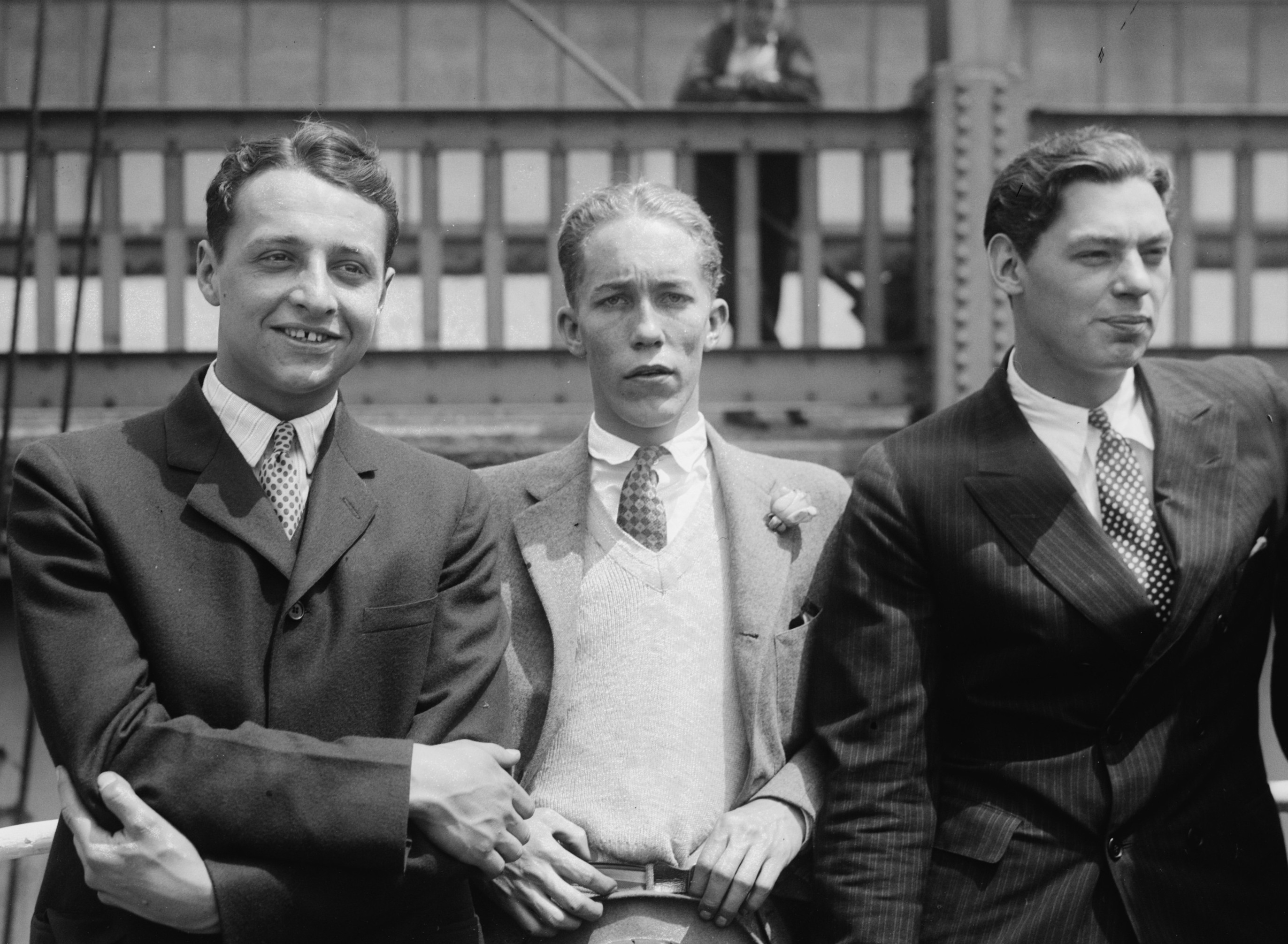
- Ralph Breyer, Bob Skelton, Johnny Weissmuller, c. 1925

Personal information
- Full name: Robert Danforth Skelton
- National team: United States
- Born: June 25, 1903 Wilmette, Illinois, U.S.
- Died: June 25, 1977 (aged 74) Houston, Texas, U.S.
- Height: 5 ft 3 in (1.60 m)
- Spouse: Elizabeth E. Railton

Sport
- Sport: Swimming
- Strokes: Breaststroke
- Club: Illinois Athletic Club
- College team: Northwestern University freshman team
- Coach: Bill Bachrach (IAC); Tom Robinson (Northwestern)
Medal record
Men's swimming
Representing the United States
Olympic Games
Gold medal – first place	1924 Paris	200 m breaststroke

Robert Danforth Skelton (June 25, 1903 – June 25, 1977) was an American competition swimmer for Northwestern University, a 1924 Olympic champion, and former world record-holder.

== Early life and swimming ==
Skelton was born in Wilmette, Illinois on June 25, 1903, to Harold Danforth Skelton and Grace Stevens Skelton. He attended New Trier High School, which by 1913 notably had one of the first public high school indoor swimming pools. While at New Trier, Robert dominated local interscholastic swimming events for several years. During his junior year, he emerged as a top-notch breaststroke swimmer and was a member of the Dolphins, New Trier's male swim team. Skelton graduated New Trier in 1922. He gained much of his subsequent swimming prowess while training and competing with the outstanding swimming program of the Illinois Athletic Club under Hall of Fame Coach Bill Bachrach. Bachrach coached Olympic champion Johnny Weissmuller during the years Skelton was active with the club.

By 1922, excelling in distance competition, Skelton held world records in the 200 and 440 yard breaststroke events. In outdoor competition, he held records in 200 and 400-meter breaststroke event.

== Northwestern University ==
Beginning in 1923, he attended Northwestern University in Evanston, Illinois, where he swam for the Northwestern Wildcats Freshman swimming and diving team in National Collegiate Athletic Association (NCAA) competition under Hall of Fame Coach Tom Robinson. Skelton was suspended for two weeks from Northwestern during his Freshman year for taking a date to a Dance Hall that was not on the school's approved list. After his suspension ended, he did not return to Northwestern for his Sophomore year.

In his career, Skelton set a world record in the 200-meter breaststroke, held several AAU National Championships, and set nine American records. On March 21, 1924, at a meet in Milwaukee, Robert broke the 200-meter breaststroke world record, previously held by Germany's Erich Rademacher.

== 1924 Olympic gold ==
At the June 1924 Olympic trials in Indianapolis, Robert won the 200-meter event, breaking his own U.S. record but falling short of the new world record set by Eric Rademacher.

Showing mastery in the preliminary heats for the 200-meter breaststroke at the 1924 Summer Olympics in Paris, he broke the Olympic record by almost six seconds with a time of 2:56.3 in his first heat. The following day, he won his semifinal, only four seconds off his record-setting pace.

In the final heat, he won the gold medal in the men's 200-meter breaststroke event. Skelton finished in 2:56.6, decisively defeating Belgian swimmer Joseph De Combe (2:59.2), and fellow American Bill Kirschbaum (3:01.0). He was the first American to set a world record for the 200-meter breaststroke.

In August 1926, Skelton was diagnosed with typhoid fever and after sinking into critical condition was treated at Evanston Hospital, continuing to recuperate through the end of 1926. He continued to compete after recovering from typhoid fever, and qualified for the 1928 Olympic team.

== Later life ==
In 1929, Skelton married Elizabeth E. Railton Skelton of Houston. He subsequently relocated to Houston and worked with construction and insurance firms. At the age of 38, in 1942, he enlisted in the Navy, serving for three years as a Chief Motor Machinist Mate (CMMOM) in the South Pacific, and was later decorated with the silver star combat medal. Little can be found about his subsequent post-war life in Houston.

He died in Houston, Texas in 1977 at the age of 74.

== Honors ==
in 1988, Skelton was listed as a pioneer swimer in the International Swimming Hall of Fame.

In 1994, Northwestern University admitted Skelton into its Athletic Hall of Fame as a posthumous honor.

== See also ==
- List of members of the International Swimming Hall of Fame
- List of Northwestern University alumni
- List of Olympic medalists in swimming (men)
- World record progression 200 metres breaststroke

== Sources ==
- Evans, Hilary; Gjerde, Arild; Heijmans, Jeroen; Mallon, Bill; et al. "Bob Skelton". Olympics at Sports-Reference.com. Sports Reference LLC. Archived from the original on April 17, 2020.
- Robert Skelton (USA) – Honor Pioneer Swimmer profile at International Swimming Hall of Fame

Records
Preceded by Erich Rademacher	Men's 200-meter breaststroke world record-holder (long course); March 21, 1924 – April 7, 1924	Succeeded by Erich Rademacher
