= Jaroslav Müller =

Czech swimmer

Personal information
- Born: 13 November 1901 Prague, Austria-Hungary

Sport
- Sport: Swimming

Jaroslav Müller (born 13 November 1901, date of death unknown) was a Czech swimmer. He competed in the men's 200 metre breaststroke event at the 1924 Summer Olympics.
