= Finnish Ski Association =

Skiing governing body in Finland

- Suomen Hiihtoliitto; Finlands skidförbund
- Formation: 1908
- Type: Sports governing body
- Headquarters: Helsinki & Lahti
- Location: Finland
- Official language: Finnish; Swedish

The Finnish Ski Association (Finnish: Suomen Hiihtoliitto, Swedish: Finlands skidförbund) is a skiing governing body in Finland, based in Helsinki and Lahti. It is a member of FIS, and runs cross-country skiing, ski jumping, Nordic skiing, and alpine skiing.

It was established in 1908 as Liitto Suomen hiihtourheilun edistämiseksi. The first chairman was Lennart Munck Af Flukila. Its modern name was adopted in 1931.

== Chairmen ==
- 1908–1911 Lennart Munck Af Flukila
- 1911–1912 Artur Antman
- 1912–1913 Eino Saastamoinen
- 1914–1915 Frans Ilander
- 1915–1931 Toivo Aro
- 1931 Armas Palmros
- 1931–1937 Juho Hillo
- 1937–1941 Tauno Aarre
- 1941–1942 Kalle Vierto
- 1942 Armas Palamaa
- 1942–1954 Yrjö Kaloniemi
- 1954–1960 Akseli Kaskela
- 1960–1967 Ali Koskimaa
- 1967–1985 Hannu Koskivuori
- 1986–1989 Matti Autio
- 1990–1995 Eino Petäjäniemi
- 1996–2000 Esko Aho
- 2000–2002 Paavo M. Petäjä
- 2003–2004 Seppo Rehunen
- 2005–2009 Jaakko Holkeri
- 2009–2013 Matti Sundberg
- 2013-2017 Jukka-Pekka Vuori
- 2017–2024 Markku Haapasalmi
