= Valborg Florström =

Finnish diver

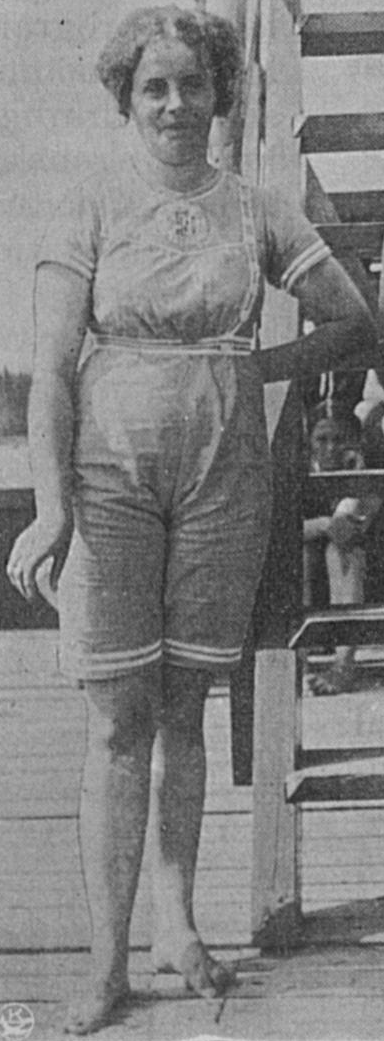

Personal information
- Full name: Hedvig Valborg Florström
- Nickname: Valma
- Nationality: Finnish
- Born: 5 December 1878 Helsinki, Grand Duchy of Finland, Russian Empire
- Died: 18 December 1956 (aged 78) Helsinki, Finland

Sport
- Sport: Diving
- Club: Helsingfors Simsällskap

Hedvig Valborg "Valma" Florström (5 December 1878 – 18 December 1956) was a Finnish diver, who won six national championships.

She performed a diving exhibition with Ebba Gisico of Sweden at the 1908 Summer Olympics, which was the first appearance of women in Olympic aquatics. This also made her the first woman in a Finnish Olympic team.

She won the Finnish national championship gold in women's platform diving in 1906, 1907, 1908, 1909, 1910 and 1911.

She represented the club Helsingfors Simsällskap, where she was a board member in 1910–1912, and a swimming teacher in 1901–1912.

== Sources ==
- Siukonen, Markku (2001). Urheilukunniamme puolustajat. Suomen olympiaedustajat 1906–2000. Suuri olympiateos (in Finnish). Jyväskylä: Graface. p. 37. ISBN 951-98673-1-7.
