= Sotkamo High School =

Sotkamo High School Sotkamon lukio

Location
- Sotkamo, Kainuu, Finland

Information
- Type: High School and Sports High School
- Principal: Mauri Reinikka
- Language: Finnish
- Website: sotkamonlukio.fi

Sotkamo High School is a High School and a sports High School located in Sotkamo, Finland.

The High School is one of the 15 official Sports High Schools in Finland named by the Finnish Olympic Committee. The School works in co-operation with Vuokatti-Ruka Sports Academy and Olympic Training Center Vuokatti. The sports of the school include eg. Cross-Country Skiing, Biathlon, Ski Jumping, Nordic Combined and Pesäpallo. Many of the students in the Sports High School come from elsewhere in Finland. Many of the students also live in dorm apartments located in Vuokatti, near the Sports Institute.

The school alumni include, for example, cross-country skiing World & Olympic Champion Iivo Niskanen and biathlon World Champion Kaisa Mäkäräinen.
