= Emerico Biach =

Italian swimmer

Personal information
- Born: 23 November 1893 Nagykanizsa, Austria-Hungary
- Died: 8 December 1972 (aged 79)

Sport
- Sport: Swimming

Emerico Biach (23 November 1893 – 8 December 1972) was an Italian swimmer. He competed in the men's 200 metre breaststroke event at the 1924 Summer Olympics.
