= Gerlacus Moes =

Dutch swimmer

Personal information
- Born: 10 August 1902 Bussum, Netherlands
- Died: 23 April 1965 (aged 62) Burlington, Ontario, Canada

Sport
- Sport: Swimming

Gerlacus Moes (10 August 1902 – 23 April 1965) was a Dutch swimmer. He competed in the men's 200 metre breaststroke event at the 1924 Summer Olympics.
