= Marius Zwiller =

French swimmer

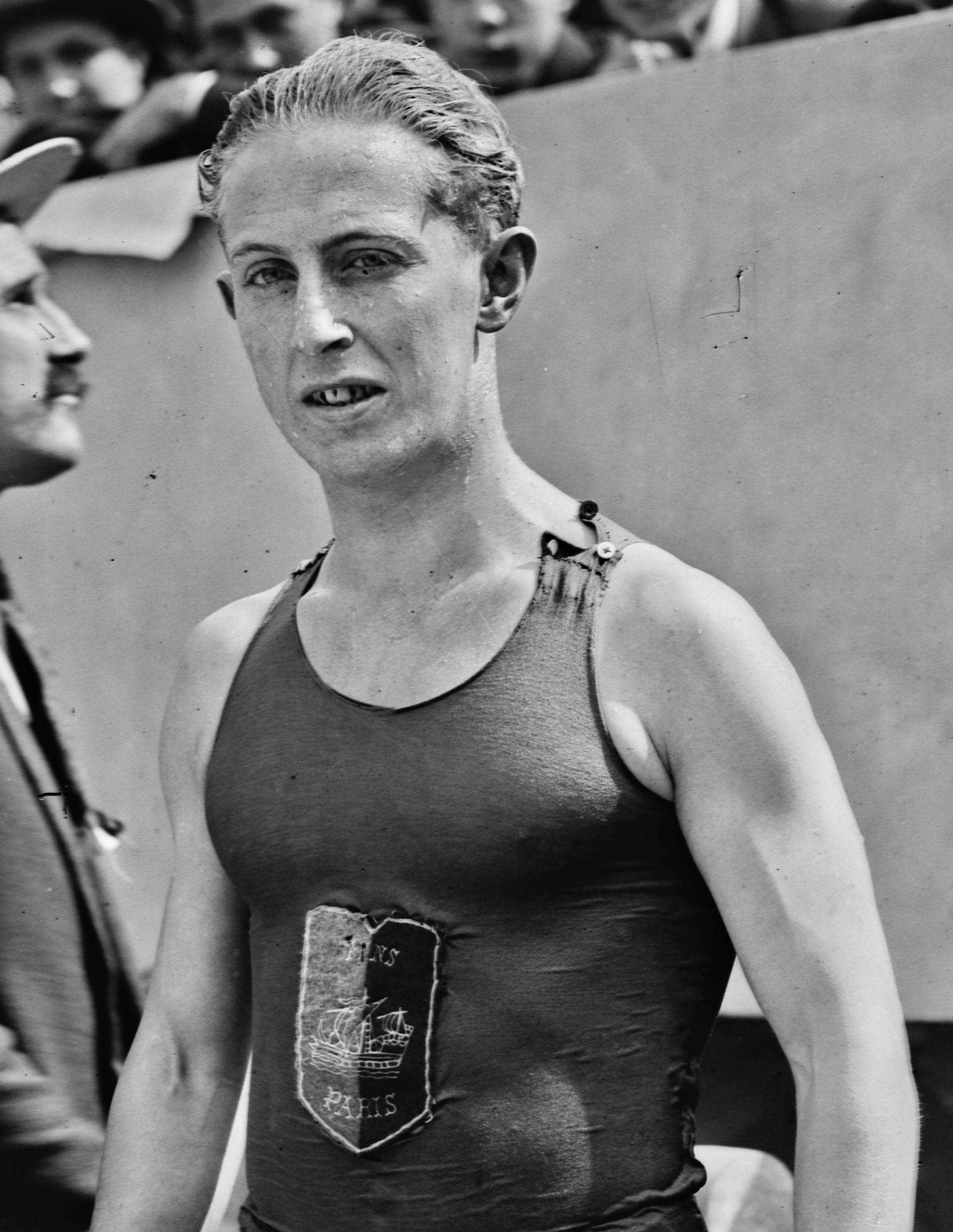
- Marius Zwiller in 1924

Personal information
- Nationality: French
- Born: 25 September 1905 Colmar, France
- Died: 12 December 2000 (aged 95) Gainesville, United States

Sport
- Sport: Swimming

Marius Zwiller (25 September 1905 – 12 December 2000) was a French swimmer. He competed in the men's 200 metre breaststroke event at the 1924 Summer Olympics.
