= Luciano Trolli =

Italian swimmer

Personal information
- Born: 13 March 1904
- Died: 19 May 1973 (aged 69)

Sport
- Sport: Swimming

Luciano Trolli (13 March 1904 – 19 May 1973) was an Italian swimmer. He competed in the men's 200 metre breaststroke event at the 1924 Summer Olympics.
