= 1907 Finnish championships in aquatics =

From 1906 to 1926, the Finnish Swimming Federation did not arrange a dedicated national competition, but spread out the hosting duties of the championship events to multiple clubs.

== Diving ==
=== Men ===
==== Plain ====
Competed in Vaasa on 20–21 August 1907.

Rank	Name	Score
1st place, gold medalist(s)	Toivo Aro	115.50 points
2nd place, silver medalist(s)	Jarl Bjelke	109.50 points
3rd place, bronze medalist(s)	Rudolf Eriksson	110.75 points
4	Einar Flinkenberg	103.50 points
5	Gunnar Ahlblad	101.00 points
6	Artur Wetzell	98.25 points
7	Eino Karjalainen	91.00 points

=== Women ===
==== Platform ====
Competed in Vaasa on 20–21 August 1907.

Rank	Name	Score
1st place, gold medalist(s)	Valborg Florström	81.0 points
2nd place, silver medalist(s)	Ebba Gisico	77.5 points
3rd place, bronze medalist(s)	Anna Ahlfors	78.0 points

== Swimming ==
=== Men ===
==== 100 metre freestyle ====
Competed on in Helsinki on 16 August 1907.

Rank	Name	Time
1st place, gold medalist(s)	Herman Cederberg	1:29.2
2nd place, silver medalist(s)	Hugo Jonsson	1:31.2
3rd place, bronze medalist(s)	Toivo Aro	1:31.8
4	John Henriksson	1:32.4
5	K. Salmi	1:32.6
5	K. Ekholm	1:32.6
7	Wolter Bremer	1:35.0
8	Väinö Vanhala	1:35.6
9	Jarl Wasström	1:41.4

==== 1000 metre freestyle ====
Competed in Helsinki on 18 August 1907.

Rank	Name	Time
1st place, gold medalist(s)	Aimo Malmberg	19:59.2
2nd place, silver medalist(s)	Hugo Jonsson	20:47.4
3rd place, bronze medalist(s)	Jarl Wasström	21:33.4
4	Salomon Rakewitsch	21:37.0

==== 200 metre breaststroke ====
Competed in Vaasa on 20–21 August 1907.

Rank	Name	Time
1st place, gold medalist(s)	Herman Cederberg	3:19.0
2nd place, silver medalist(s)	Hugo Jonsson	3:29.2
3rd place, bronze medalist(s)	Gunnar Ahlblad	3:52.3

==== 100 metre life saving ====
Competed in Helsinki on 17 August 1907.

Rank	Name	Time
1st place, gold medalist(s)	Aimo Malmberg	2:03.4
2nd place, silver medalist(s)	Herman Cederberg	2:09.4
3rd place, bronze medalist(s)	Hugo Jonsson	2:27.4
4	Väinö Siro	2:39.6
5	Eino Karjalainen	2:43.4
6	Elis Sivén	3:04.6

==== 4 × 50 metre freestyle relay ====
Competed in Helsinki on 18 August 1907.

Rank	Club	Team	Time
1st place, gold medalist(s)	Helsingfors Simsällskap	K. Salmi, Hugo Jonsson, K. Ekholm, Toivo Aro	2:33.2
2nd place, silver medalist(s)	Kotkan Uimaseura	Väinö Vanhala, Siikanen, E. Finberg, W. Finberg	2:44.8
3rd place, bronze medalist(s)	Vaasan Uimaseura	Wolter Bremer, Jarl Bjelke, Herman Cederberg, John Henriksson	2:45.0
4	Tampereen Uimaseura	W. Ullström, Elis Sivén, Väinö Siro, Kalle Aaltonen	2:52.4

=== Women ===
==== 100 metre freestyle ====
Competed in Vaasa on 20–21 August 1907.

Rank	Name	Time
1st place, gold medalist(s)	Elsa Lingonblad	1:55.1
2nd place, silver medalist(s)	Hanna Björkman	1:55.1
3rd place, bronze medalist(s)	Ebba Gisico	2:06.7

== Sources ==
- Teräsvirta, Paavo, ed. (1956). Suomen uimaliitto. Finska simförbundet. 1906–1956 (in Finnish). Helsinki: Finnish Swimming Federation. pp. 154–159.
