= Henri Bouvier =

French swimmer

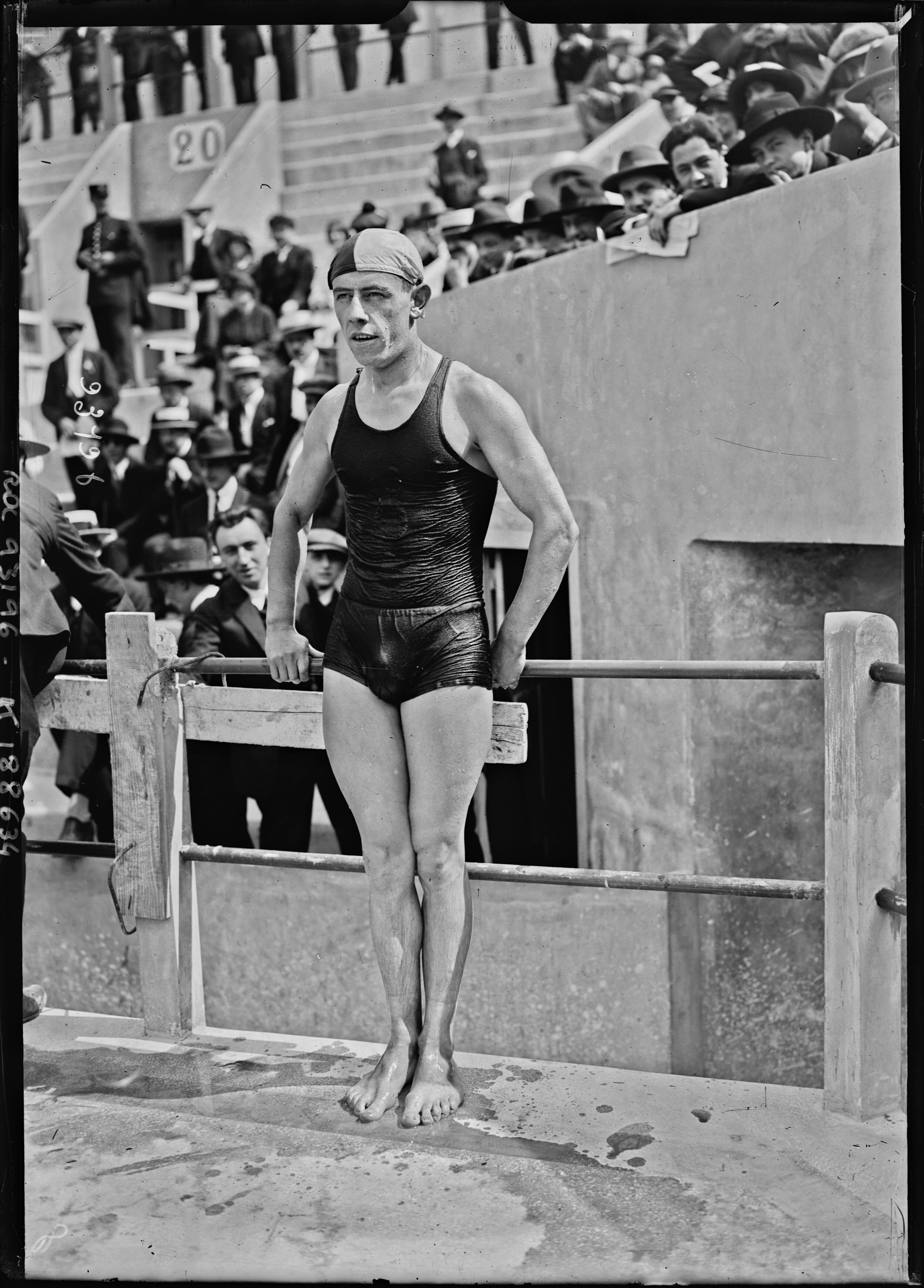
- Bouvier in 1924

Personal information
- Nationality: French
- Born: 1901

Sport
- Sport: Swimming

Henri Bouvier (born 1901, date of death unknown) was a French swimmer. He competed in the men's 200 metre breaststroke event at the 1924 Summer Olympics.
