= Robert Wyss =

Swiss swimmer (1901–1956)

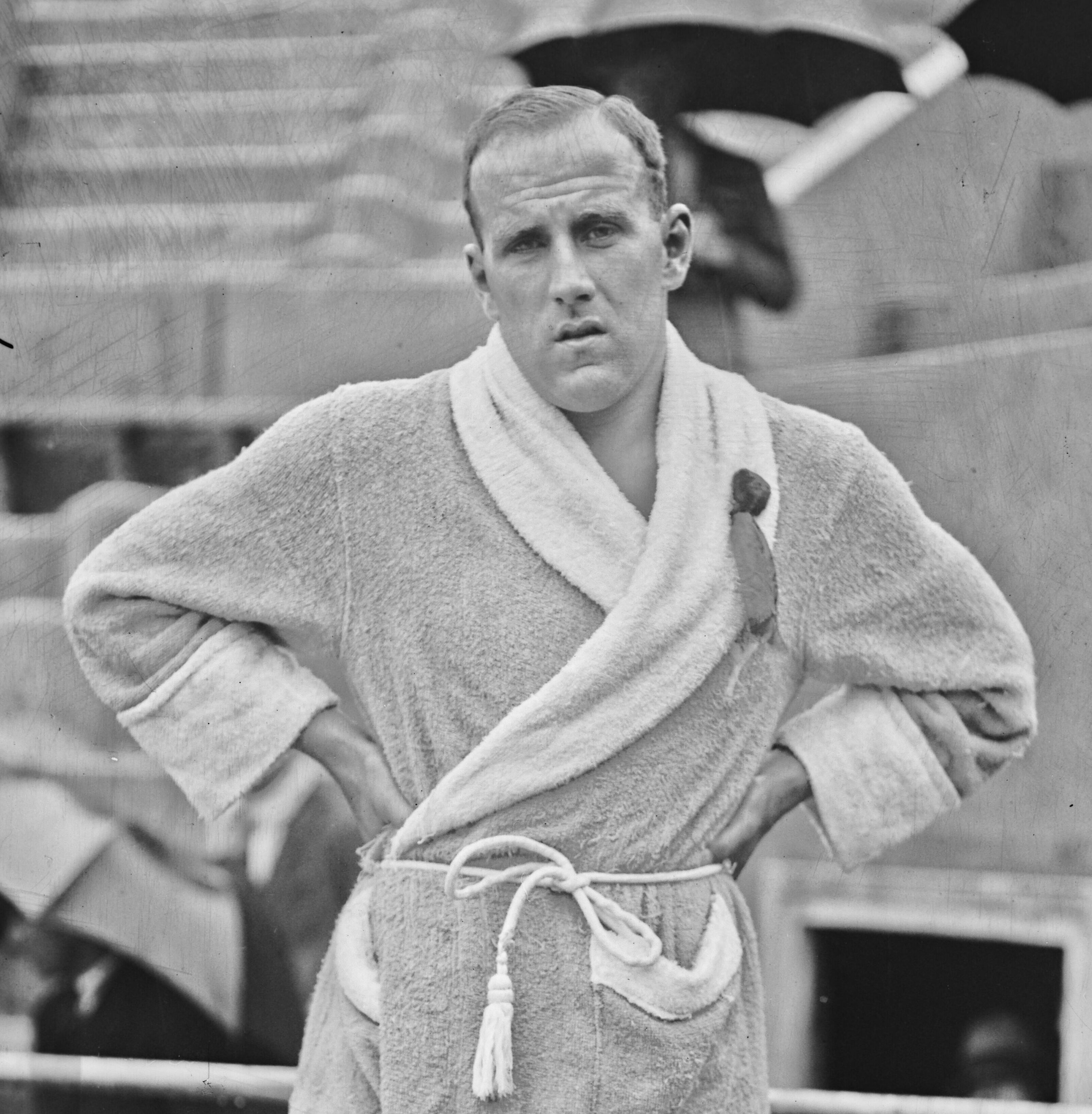
- Robert Wyss in 1927

Personal information
- Full name: Josef Robert Wyss
- Born: 17 January 1901 Basel, Switzerland
- Died: 13 May 1956 (aged 55) Basel, Switzerland
- Relative: Tenny Wyss (sister)

Sport
- Country: Switzerland
- Sport: Swimming, water polo

Josef Robert Wyss (17 January 1901 – 13 May 1956) was a Swiss freestyle swimmer and water polo player. He competed in the breaststroke event at the 1924 Summer Olympics and the 1928 Summer Olympics and played water polo at the 1924, 1928 and 1936 Summer Olympics.
