= John Henriksson =

Finnish swimmer

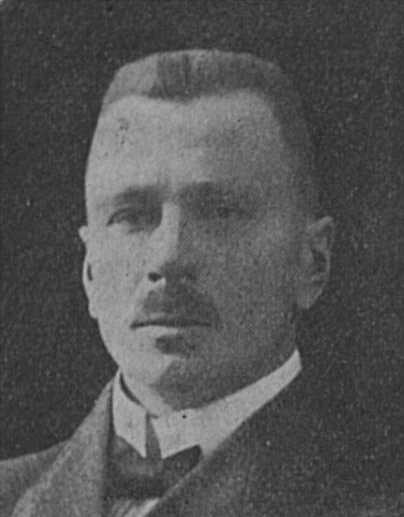

Personal information
- Full name: John Gustav Henriksson
- Born: 30 May 1883 Helsinki, Grand Duchy of Finland, Russian Empire
- Died: 1 November 1948 (aged 65) Helsinki, Finland
- Education: Physical education teacher, University of Helsinki, 1920
- Occupations: Teacher, journalist, copy editor

Sport
- Country: Finland
- Sport: Swimming
- Club: Vaasan Uimaseura; Helsingfors Simsällskap

John Gustav Henriksson (30 May 1883 – 1 November 1948) was a Finnish swimmer, who competed in two events at the 1908 Summer Olympics.

== Sport ==
=== Olympics ===
John Henriksson at the Olympic Games
Games	Event	Stage	Rank	Time	Notes
1908 Summer Olympics	100 metre backstroke	First round	3rd in heat	unknown	Did not advance
1908 Summer Olympics	200 metre breaststroke	First round	3rd in heat	unknown	Did not advance

=== National ===
He won gold in 4 × 50 metre freestyle relay at the 1908 Finnish championships.

He was a member of two clubs:

- Vaasan Uimaseura, an honorary member since 1922
- Helsingfors Simsällskap. An honorary member since 1937. Chairman in 1914–1916 and a board member in 1909–1940.

He was the secretary of Finnish Swimming Federation in 1908–1909 and 1916.

== Occupation ==
Henriksson graduated as a physical education teacher in 1920 and worked as one in 1909–1948.

He was a copy editor in the magazine Finskt Iddrottsblad and a sports reporter in the newspaper Hufvudstadsbladet.
