= Satakunta Museum =

Coordinates: 61°29′05″N 21°46′49″E

- Satakunnan Museo
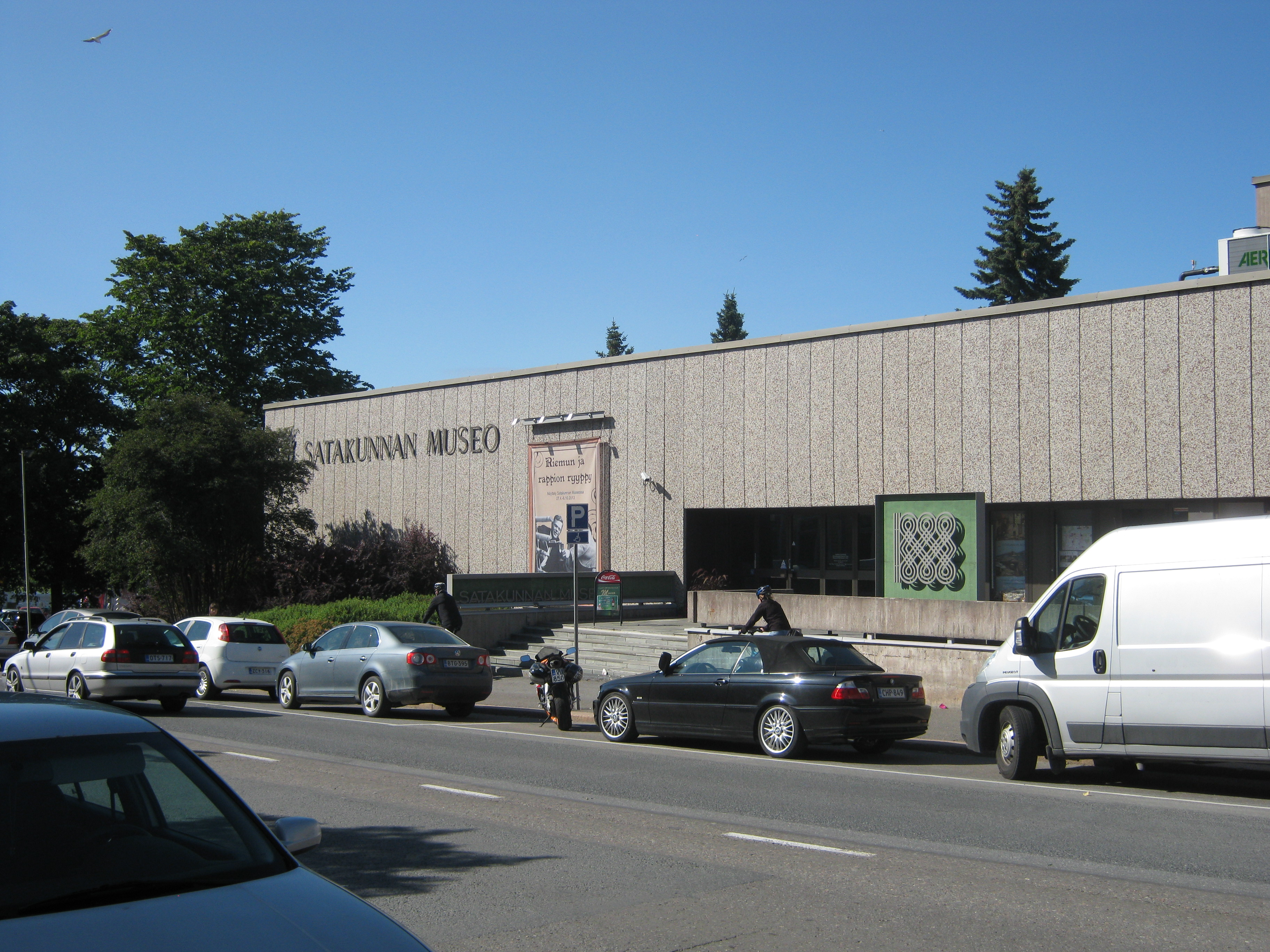
- Established: 1888
- Location: Pori, Finland
- Type: Historical museum
- Director: Juhani Ruohonen

The Satakunta Museum (Finnish: Satakunnan Museo, Swedish: Satakunda Museum) is a historical museum in the city of Pori, Finland. The museum was established in 1888 and it is one of the oldest historical museums in Finland. In 1980, Satakunta Museum was given the status of a Regional Museum.

Satakunta Museum presents the history of Satakunta province and the city of Pori. The collections include over 80,000 artefacts and other objects. The museum's archives include over 300,000 photographs, maps and architectural drawings. Satakunta Museum is located near the city center by the river Kokemäenjoki. The present museum building was completed in 1973.
