= Bill Kirschbaum =

American swimmer (1902–1953)

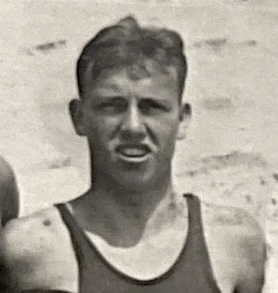

Personal information
- Full name: William Thomas Kirschbaum
- National team: United States
- Born: November 5, 1902 Fort Williams, Maine, U.S.
- Died: April 29, 1953 (aged 50) San Mateo, California, U.S.
- Spouse: Adele
- Children: 2

Sport
- Sport: Swimming
- Strokes: Breaststroke
- Club: U.S. Navy; Hui Makami Club
- Coach: Harvey P. Chilton (Hui Makami)
Medal record
Men's swimming
Representing the United States
Olympic Games
Bronze medal – third place	1924 Paris	200 m breaststroke

William Thomas Kirschbaum (November 5, 1902 – April 29, 1953) was an American competition swimmer and 1924 Paris Olympic medalist in the 200-meter breaststroke. He was an unofficial holder of a world record in the 200-meter backstroke of 3:00.2. He would later work for the Matson Cruise Lines.

Kirschbaum was born in Maine on November 15, 1902, and after a family move, attended public school Number 10 in Patterson, New Jersey, where he grew up on Patterson's Warren Street. Kirschbaum enjoyed drawing as a pastime. After High School, he enlisted the U.S. Navy around 1921 and swam for their team, and after having married after his discharge, chose to remain for a period in Hawaii. His parents lived on Putnam Street in the Riverside Section of Patterson, New Jersey by 1924.

At the Hawaiian Olympic swimming meet in Honolulu, swimming for the Hui Makani team on April 13, 1924, Kirschbaum broke his own record in the 200-meter breast stroke with a time of 3:02.1, breaking the standing American record, and making himself a likely prospect for the U.S. Olympic trials. In the 1920's, and in preparation for the 1924 Olympics, the Hui Makani Club was coached primarily by Harvey Porter Chilton. By June 1924, Kirschbaum was considered the Hawaiian contingents strongest Olympic prospect in the breaststroke.

Kirschbaum set another record on May 25, 1924, in Palo Alto at a "Far Western" Try out at Searsville, Lake, the training location for Stanford University, swimming the event in 3:00.2. The official American olympic trial location for the men's swimming team was in Indianapolis, Indiana.

== 1924 Olympic Bronze medal ==
At the 1924 Summer Olympics in Paris, he received the bronze medal in July for his third-place performance in the men's 200-meter breaststroke event, finishing in a time of 3:01.0, only about a second behind silver medalist Joseph de Combe of Belgium. American Gold medalist Bob Skelton won the event in a time of 2:56.6, but had set an Olympic record in the first heat. His final time was six seconds short of the standing world record.

After an illness of around two months, Kirschbaum died at his home on Cambridge Road in Belmont, California, three miles South of San Mateo, on April 29, 1953. He had been working as a buyer for Matson Navigation Lines, an employer of Pua Kealoha, another Hawaiian swimmer who competed for Hui Makami, and was a 1920 Olympian. Kirschbaum was survived by his widow Adele, and two children, Nancy and Robert. A memorial service was held on Saturday, May 2 at the White Oaks Chapel in San Carlos.

== See also ==
- List of Olympic medalists in swimming (men)
