= Oskar Wetzell =

Finnish diver

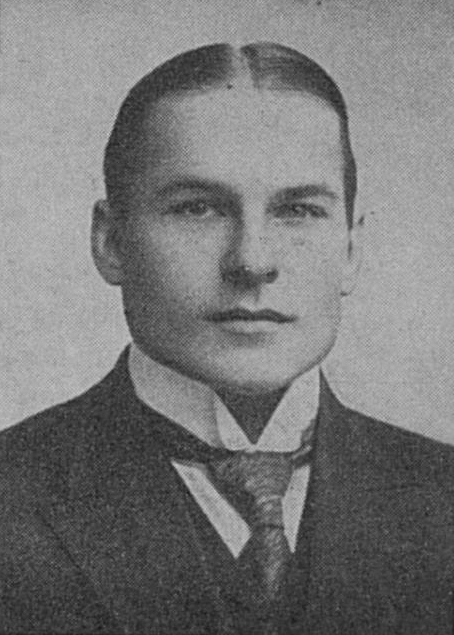

Personal information
- Full name: Oskar Wilhelm Wetzell
- Born: 5 December 1888 Helsinki, Grand Duchy of Finland, Russian Empire
- Died: 28 November 1928 (aged 39) Helsinki, Finland
- Occupation: Bookbinder
- Spouse: Selma Maria Forsström
- Other interests: Stage magic

Sport
- Country: Finland
- Sport: Diving
- Club: Helsingfors Simsällskap; Helsingin Uimarit

Oskar Wilhelm Wetzell (5 December 1888 – 28 November 1928) was a Finnish diver, who competed at the 1908 and the 1912 Summer Olympics.

== Diving ==
=== Olympics ===
Wetzell was the first deaf person ever to compete at the Olympics twice. He is also the only deaf Finnish Olympian.

Oskar Wetzell at the Olympic Games
Games	Event	Stage	Rank	Notes
1908 Summer Olympics	3 metre springboard	Round one	2nd in heat	Advanced to semi-final
1908 Summer Olympics	3 metre springboard	Semi-final	6th in heat	Did not advance
1908 Summer Olympics	10 metre platform	Round one	4th in heat	Did not advance
1912 Summer Olympics	3 metre springboard	Round one	7th in heat	Did not advance
1912 Summer Olympics	10 metre platform	Round one	6th in heat	Did not advance
1912 Summer Olympics	Plain high diving	Round one	2nd in heat	Did not advance

=== National ===
He won eight Finnish national championships in diving:

- springboard diving: 1908, 1909, 1912, 1913, 1921
- platform diving: 1909, 1911, 1913

He represented the clubs Helsingfors Simsällskap and Helsingin Uimarit.

== Biography ==
Oskar Wetzell became deaf after being confronted with influenza when he was just two years old. He was sent to the Porvoo Deaf School at the age of seven. His father worked initially at the Sinebrychoff Brewery in Helsinki and later went on to become a merchant.

He became interested in stage magic at the age of 20. In the 1920s he performed in clubs and major charity events. He modeled his show after Tobias Bamberg.

He married Selma Maria Forsström in 1916. They had four children.

He was an inaugural board member of the Nordic Balticum Deaf Sport Federation. He was a founding member of the Finnish Deaf Sports Federation, and was its secretary in 1921–1922.

He died of stomach cancer.
