= Finnish Olympic Committee =

National Olympic Committee

- Country: Finland
- [[|]]
- Code: FIN
- Created: 1907
- Recognized: 1907
- Continental Association: EOC
- Headquarters: Helsinki, Finland
- President: Jan Vapaavuori
- Secretary General: Taina Susiluoto
- Website: www.olympiakomitea.fi

Old logo until 2017

The Finnish Olympic Committee (Finnish: Suomen Olympiakomitea ry; Swedish: Finlands Olympiska Kommitté rf; IOC Code: FIN) is the national Olympic committee in Finland for the Olympic Games movement. It is a non-profit organisation that selects teams, and raises funds to send Finnish competitors to Olympic events organised by the International Olympic Committee (IOC).

The schools, colleges, universities and other establishments in the programme are organised into local clusters. For example:

- The Sotkamo High School works in collaboration with several other schools, colleges and universities as part of the Vuokatti-Ruka Sports Academy.
- The Joensuu Sports Academy is a co-operation network of schools, colleges and universities.
- The Urhea Metropolitan Sports Academy is based in Helsinki and includes the National Olympic Training Centre.

Others include the Kuortane High School and Sports Academy and the Pajulahti Sports Institute.

== Presidents ==
President	Term
Reinhold Felix von Willebrand	1907–1919
Ernst Krogius	1919–1929
Kustaa Levälahti	1929–1937
Urho Kekkonen	1937–1946
Wilhelm Lehtinen	1946–1951
Väinö Karikoski	1951–1956
Yrjö Valkama	1956–1961
Jukka Rangell	1961–1963
Akseli Kaskela	1963–1969
Jukka Uunila	1969–1984
Carl-Olaf Homén	1984–1988
Tapani Ilkka	1988–2004
Roger Talermo	2004–2012
Risto Nieminen	2012–2016
Timo Ritakallio	2016–present

== See also ==
- Finland at the Olympics
- Finnish Paralympic Committee
