= Hugo Jonsson =

Finnish swimmer (1884–1949)

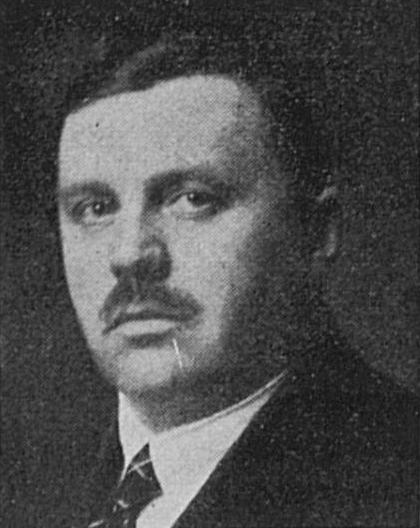
- Hugo Jonsson circa 1929

Personal information
- Full name: Hugo Alarik Jonsson
- National team: Finland
- Born: 25 February 1884; Helsinki, Grand Duchy of Finland, Russian Empire
- Died: 9 April 1949 (aged 65); Helsinki, Finland
- Education: Construction engineer, Helsinki Industrial School, 1903
- Occupation: Master builder
- Spouse: Ellen Maria Forstén

Sport
- Sport: Aquatics
- Events: Breaststroke swimming; Backstroke swimming; Water polo
- Club: Helsingfors Simsällskap

Hugo Alarik Jonsson (25 February 1884 – 9 April 1949) was a Finnish swimmer who competed at the 1908 Summer Olympics.

== Aquatics ==
=== Olympics ===
Hugo Jonsson at the Olympic Games
| Games | Event | Stage | Rank | Time | Notes |
|---|---|---|---|---|---|
| 1908 Summer Olympics | 100 metre backstroke | First round | 3rd in heat | unknown | Did not advance. Source: |
| 1908 Summer Olympics | 200 metre breaststroke | First round | Did not finish | | Did not advance. Source: |

=== National ===
He won some Finnish national championships in aquatics:

- 4 × 50 metre freestyle relay: 1907
- Water polo: 1908, 1910, 1911

He was the chairman of the club Helsingfors Simsällskap in 1913, and a board member in 1908–1911 and 1925–1930.

== Other ==
His father was a master stonecutter. He married Ellen Maria Forstén in 1914.

He received the Cross of Liberty, 4th Class and the Commemorative Medal of the Liberation War.

== Sources ==
- Siukonen, Markku (2001). Urheilukunniamme puolustajat. Suomen olympiaedustajat 1906–2000. Suuri olympiateos (in Finnish). Jyväskylä: Graface. p. 96. ISBN 951-98673-1-7.
