= Viljo Viklund =

Finnish swimmer

Personal information
- Born: 1 May 1903 Tampere, Grand Duchy of Finland
- Died: 17 March 1971 (aged 67) Tampere, Finland

Sport
- Sport: Swimming

Viljo Viklund (1 May 1903 – 17 March 1971) was a Finnish swimmer. He competed in the men's 200 metre breaststroke event at the 1924 Summer Olympics.
