= Elis Johansson =

Swedish middle-distance runner (1897–1956)

Personal information
- Nationality: Swedish
- Born: 29 August 1897
- Died: 10 December 1956 (aged 59)

Sport
- Sport: Middle-distance running
- Event: 800 metres

Elis Johansson (29 August 1897 – 10 December 1956) was a Swedish middle-distance runner. He competed in the men's 800 metres at the 1920 Summer Olympics.
