= Tyyne Järvi =

Finnish swimmer

Personal information
- Born: 4 February 1891 Vaasa, Grand Duchy of Finland
- Died: 4 April 1929 (aged 38) Lapinjärvi, Finland

Sport
- Sport: Swimming

Tyyne Järvi (4 February 1891 – 4 April 1929) was a Finnish swimmer. She competed in the women's 100 metre freestyle event at the 1912 Summer Olympics. She was the first woman to represent Finland at the Olympics.
