= Helsingin Uimarit =

Helsingin Uimarit (HU) is a non-profit swimming club operating in Helsinki, Finland. HU was established in 1916. Today, there are more than 300 members taking part in HU:s swimming groups and -schools. HU has won the award for the best club in Finnish championships in swimming 28 times in a row. Activities such as racing, skating, and water polo exist within the school.

== History ==
Founded in 1916, the Helsinki Swimmers was the only available pool for Helsinki swimming activities. Since the establishment, 427 Finnish Championships have been won by the club.
