= Kyösti Järvinen =

Finnish professor, social scientist and politician (1869–1957)

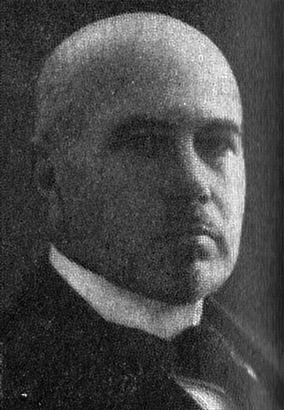
Kyösti Järvinen

Kyösti Järvinen (31 March 1869, Jyväskylä – 31 March 1957) was a Finnish social scientist, politician and Professor of political science at the Helsinki School of Economics.

Järvinen was the first Dean of the Helsinki School of Economics and served from 1911 to 1919, and Professor of political science from 1922 to 1939. He was a member of parliament from 1922 to 1930, and served as Minister of Trade and Industry in the Mantere Cabinet (22 December 1928 - 16 August 1929), and Minister of Finance from December 1925 to December 1926 and from March 1931 to December 1932.

== Selected publications ==
- Järvinen, Kyösti Nestor. Der Zahlungsverkehr im Aussenhandel Finnlands vor der Ausbildung des einheimischen Bankwesens: ein Beitrag zur Entwicklungsgeschichte des internationalen Zahlungswesens. Vol. 30. G. Fischer, 1921.
