= Herman Cederberg =

Finnish swimmer

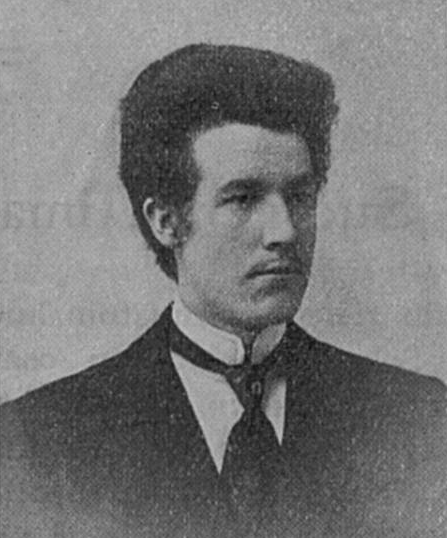
- Herman Cederberg circa 1906

Personal information
- Full name: Herman Edvard Cederberg
- Born: 7 September 1883; Korsholm, Grand Duchy of Finland, Russian Empire
- Died: 30 January 1969 (aged 85); Vaasa, Finland
- Occupation(s): Depot manager, merchant

Sport
- Country: Finland
- Sport: Swimming
- Club: Vaasan uimaseura

Herman Edvard Cederberg (7 September 1883 – 30 January 1969) was a Finnish swimmer who competed at the 1908 and the 1912 Summer Olympics.

== Swimming ==
=== Olympics ===
Herman Cederberg at the Olympic Games
Games	Event	Stage	Rank	Time	Notes
1908 Summer Olympics	200 metre breaststroke	First round	4th–5th in heat	unknown	Did not advance.
1908 Summer Olympics	100 metre backstroke	First round	Did not start		
1912 Summer Olympics	200 metre breaststroke	Quarterfinals	3rd in heat	3:18.6	Did not advance

=== National ===
He won some Finnish championships in swimming:

- 100 metre freestyle: 1906, 1907
- 1000 metre freestyle: 1906
- 200 metre breaststroke: 1906, 1907
- 100 metre life saving: 1908, 1912
- 4 × 50 metre freestyle relay: 1908
