= Lennart Lindroos =

Finnish swimmer

Personal information
- Born: December 2, 1886
- Died: July 26, 1921 (aged 34)

Sport
- Sport: Swimming

Karl Gustaf Lennart Lindroos (December 2, 1886 – July 26, 1921) was a Finnish breaststroke swimmer who competed in the 1912 Summer Olympics. He was born in Helsinki. In 1912 he was eliminated in the semi-finals of the 200 metre breaststroke event as well as in the semi-finals of the 400 metre breaststroke competition.
