= Arvid Rydman =

Finnish gymnast

- Born: 25 June 1884 Alavus, Grand Duchy of Finland, Russian Empire
- Died: 14 May 1953 (aged 68) Pori, Finland

Gymnastics career
- Discipline: Men's artistic gymnastics
- Country represented: Finland
Medal record
Men's artistic gymnastics
Representing Finland
Olympic Games
Silver medal – second place	1912 Stockholm	Team, free system

Arvid Rydman (25 June 1884 – 14 May 1953) was a Finnish gymnast who competed in the 1912 Summer Olympics. He was part of the Finnish team, which won the silver medal in the gymnastics men's team, free system event.

After his sporting career, Rydman worked as the director of Satakunta Museum in Pori from 1930 until his death. Rydman was married to Kerttu Snellman, the granddaughter of Finnish statesman Johan Vilhelm Snellman.
