= Kalle Kainuvaara =

Finnish diver

Personal information
- Born: 19 March 1891 Kuopio, Finland
- Died: 21 October 1943 (aged 52)

Sport
- Sport: Diving, modern pentathlon

Kalle Kainuvaara (19 March 1891 – 21 October 1943) was a Finnish diver who competed in the 1912 Summer Olympics and 1920 Summer Olympics. He was born in Kuopio, Finland.

In 1912, he competed in both the men's 10 metre platform and men's plain high events. In 1920 he also competed in the men's 10 metre platform and men's plain high events, as well as in the modern pentathlon.

He was killed in action during World War II.
