= Väinö Hannula =

Finnish politician

Väinö Hannula

Väinö Adolf Hannula (2 May 1893 – 14 August 1953) was a Finnish politician. He was imprisoned for some time in 1918 for having sided with the Reds during the Finnish Civil War.

Hannula was born in Turku and was a member of the Parliament of Finland from 1922 to 1923, representing the Socialist Workers' Party of Finland (SSTP). When the SSTP was banned in 1923, he was imprisoned on sedition charges. He was again imprisoned for political reasons from 1930 to 1934.
