= Yrjö Valkama =

Finnish diver

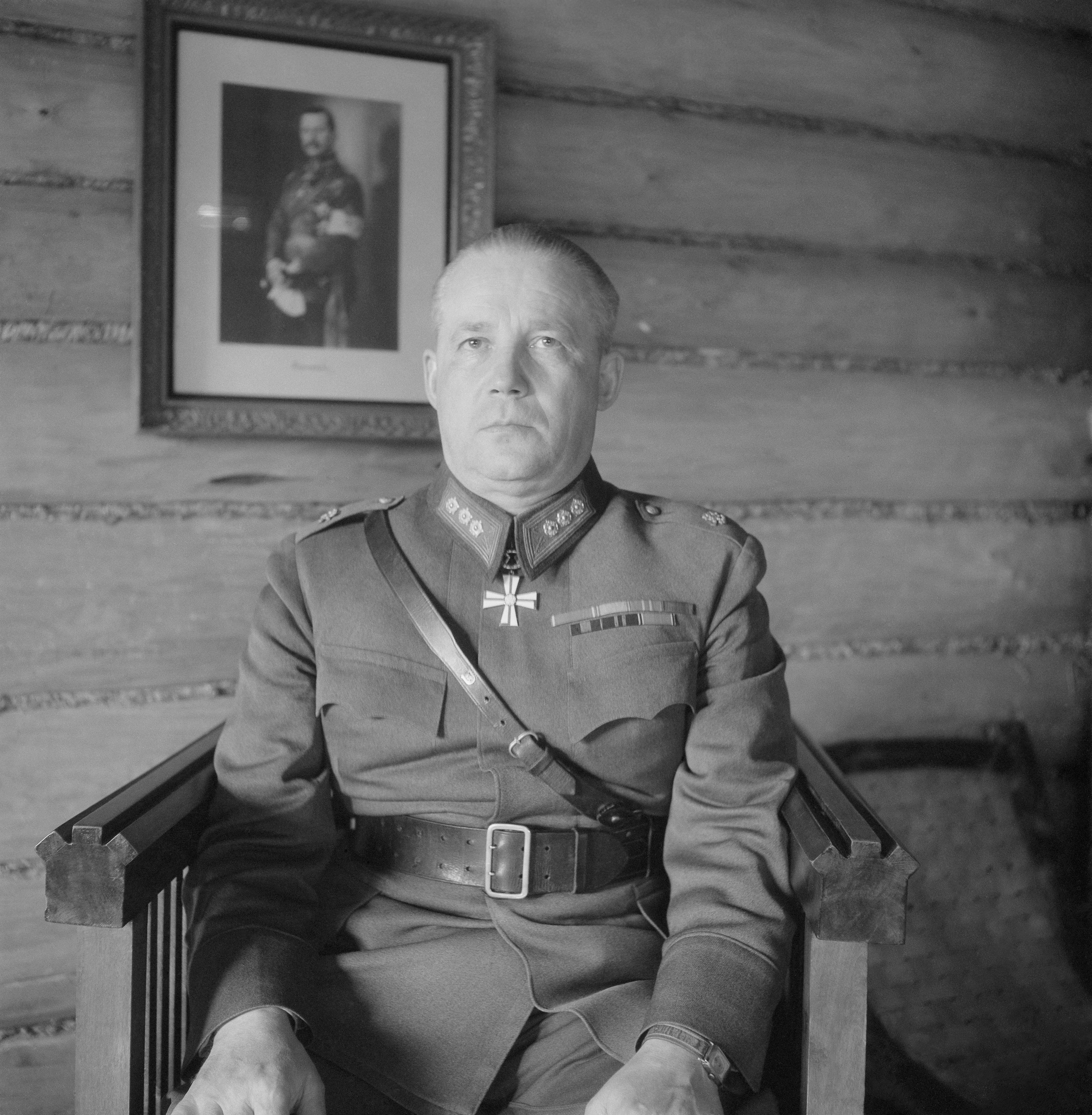
- Yrjö Valkama in 1944

Personal information
- Born: 5 June 1894 Helsinki, Grand Duchy of Finland
- Died: 3 March 1975 (aged 80) Helsinki, Finland

Sport
- Sport: Diving

Yrjö Armas Valkama (ne Flaming, 5 June 1894 – 3 March 1975) was a Finnish diver, who competed in the 1920 Summer Olympics and in the 1924 Summer Olympics.

In 1920, he finished fifth in the plain high diving event. Four years later, he was eliminated in the first round of the plain high diving competition.
