= Anna Järvinen =

Swedish-Finnish singer and musician

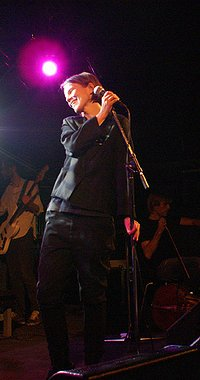
- Anna Järvinen in Malmö 2007

Background information
- Born: 16 April 1970 (age 56); Helsinki, Finland
- Genres: Pop, soul
- Occupation: singer
- Years active: 1995–present
- Labels: Häpna, Universal
- Website: annajarvinen.se

Anna Päivikki Järvinen (born 16 April 1970) is a Swedish–Finnish composer, singer and musician who was a member of the group Granada before they split in 2003. Järvinen afterwards started a solo career and has so far released four albums and worked with artists like Olle Ljungström, Melody Club, Dungen, Björn Olsson and Olavi Uusivirta.

== Biography ==
Anna Järvinen moved as a six-year-old with her mother to Stockholm. She sang in the Swedish popgroup Granada from the mid-1990s up until their split in 2003. After having been refused by several record companies she at last released her debut album Jag fick feeling in November 2007 with the record company Häpna. The album was nominated for four grammis and was hailed by the press. The album also gained attention in Järvinen's country of birth and she toured both Finland and Sweden in the autumn of 2007 and spring/summer of 2008.

In 2009, Anna Järvinen's second album Man var bland molnen was released and nominated for three grammis. Just as her debut this album was also hailed by critics. The music critic Jan Gradvall wrote in his review that "Anna Järvinen here climbs forth as one of Sweden's most original and talented artists." The same year she sang a duet with Olle Ljungström on his album Sju and in December 2009 released a hit with Melody Club called "I Don't Believe in Angels".

On 5 February 2010, she was a guest artist in SVT's På spåret. In November 2010 she collaborated on a tribute album to the poet Sonja Åkesson with the two composed poems "O, ur Hästens öga" and "Ajajaj". During the Grammis Gala 2011 Järvinen performed together with Nina Kinert, Karla-Thérèse Kjellvander and The Rockridge Brothers Håkan Hellströms "Vid protesfabrikens stängsel". In 2011 she released her third album Anna Själv Tredje. In 2011 she also collaborated with Finnish artist Olavi Uusivirta and released the Finnish-language song "Nuori ja kaunis" which became a big hit in Finland.

On 9 November 2011 it was revealed that Järvinen was due to compete with the song "Porslin" in Melodifestivalen 2012. For unknown reasons the song didn't end up competing that year and was replaced by David Lindgren's song "Shout It Out". But SVT later revealed that the song will be competing in the 2013 edition of Melodifestivalen instead.

Anna Järvinen also works as an art teacher and English teacher at the Käppala school in Lidingö.

=== Albums ===
Title	Details	Peak chart positions
Title	Details	SWE
Jag fick feeling	First studio album; Released: 3 October 2007	46
Man var bland molnen	Second studio album; Released: 23 March 2009	18
Anna själv tredje	Third studio album; Released: 30 March 2011	6
Buren	Fourth studio album; Released: 2015	—
Anna. En Anna	Fifth studio album; Finnish language; Released: 2016	—
