= Albert Nyman =

Finnish diver

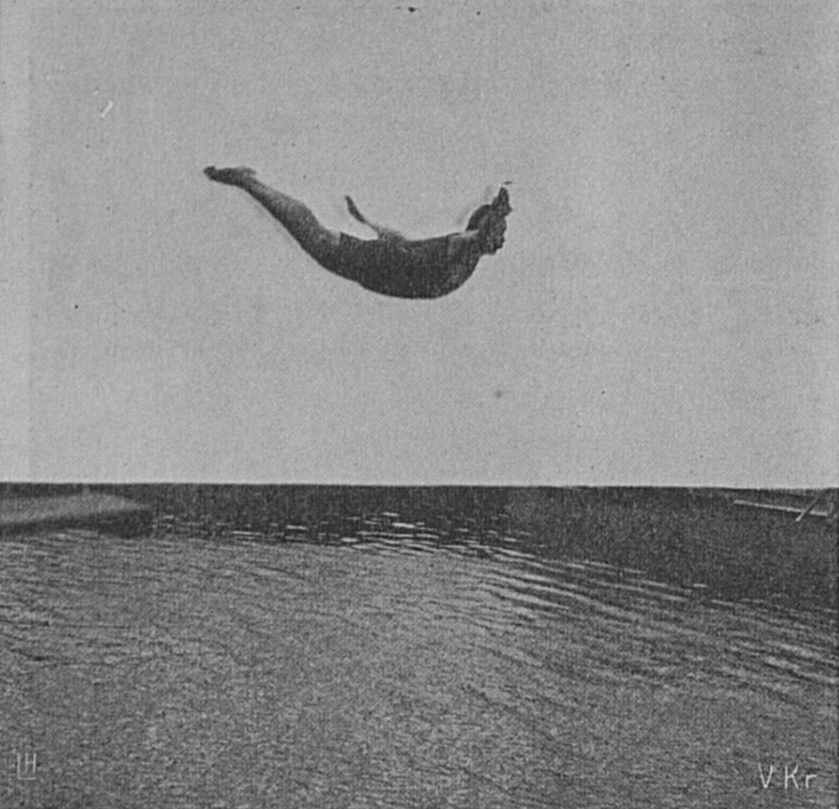

Personal information
- Nationality: Finnish
- Born: 22 November 1872 Helsinki, Finland
- Died: 9 March 1924 (aged 51) Helsinki, Finland

Sport
- Sport: Diving

Albert Nyman (22 November 1872 – 9 March 1924) was a Finnish diver. He competed in the men's plain high diving event at the 1912 Summer Olympics.
