= Leo Suni =

Finnish diver

Personal information
- Born: May 18, 1891; Helsinki, Finland
- Died: May 31, 1942 (aged 51); Helsinki, Finland

Sport
- Sport: Diving

Leo Olavi Suni (May 18, 1891 – May 31, 1942) was a Finnish diver who competed in the 1912 Summer Olympics. He was born (and died in) Helsinki, Finland. In 1912 he competed in both the men's 10 metre platform and men's plain high events.
