= Arvo Aaltonen =

Finnish swimmer

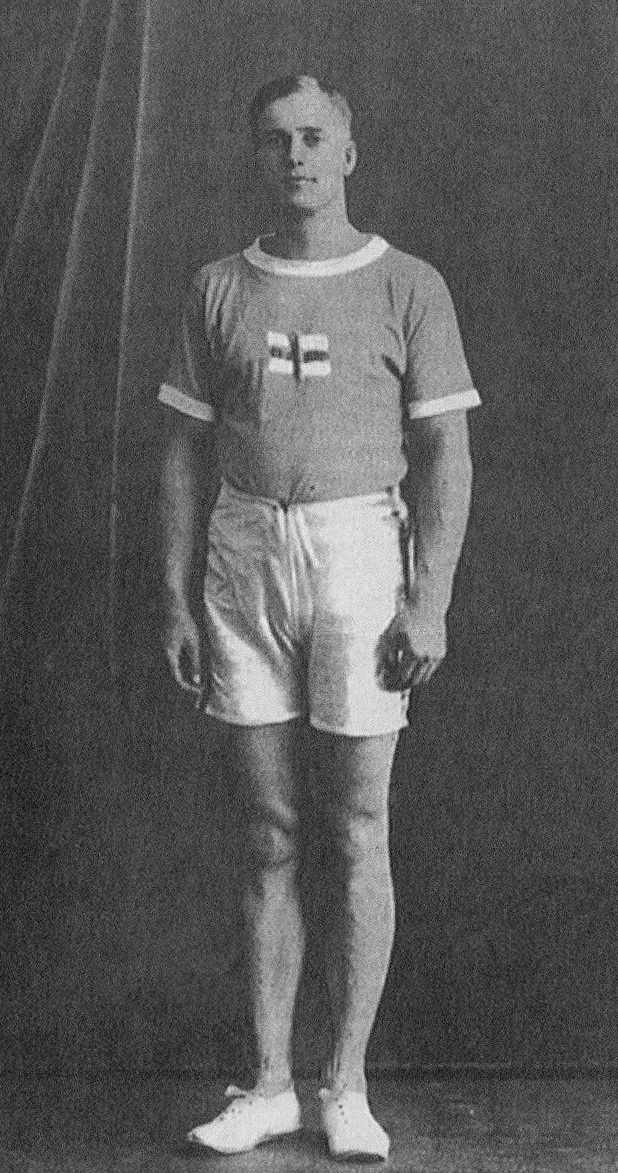

Personal information
- Born: 2 December 1892 Pori, Finland
- Died: 17 June 1949 (aged 59) Pori, Finland

Sport
- Sport: Swimming
- Strokes: breaststroke

Achievements and titles
- Personal best(s): 100 m – 1:23.1 (1919); 200 m – 2:58.9 (1925); 400 m – 6:25.4 (1913)
Medal record
Representing Finland
Olympic Games
Bronze medal – third place	1920 Antwerp	200 m breaststroke
Bronze medal – third place	1920 Antwerp	400 m breaststroke

Arvo Ossian Aaltonen (2 December 1892 – 17 June 1949) was a Finnish breaststroke swimmer who competed at the 1912, 1920 and 1924 Summer Olympics. He won bronze medals in the 200 m and 400 m events in 1920, and failed to reach the finals in 1912 and 1924.

Aaltonen was the first, and until 1992 (with Antti Kasvio's bronze medal-winning 200m freestyle performance), the only Finnish Olympic medalist in swimming. He won the 200 m event at the 1923 Nordic Championships, and he held 22 Finnish titles: in the 100 m (1912, 1915–17), 200 m (1909, 1911–13, 1915–16, 1919–21, 1923, 1925–27) and 400 m (1912–13, 1915–17). In 1924–30 and 1946–47, he was a Finnish Swimming Federation board member. He immigrated to Canada in 1929 but returned to Finland in 1937.
