= Swimming by country =

This is a list of articles about swimming in each country around the world. Most countries have two national championships per year, one in long course and one in short course. Some countries also have a national team championship.

Country	Overview	National association	Swimmers	Records	National championship (LC)	National championship (SC)	National clubs/teams championship
Albania		Albanian Swimming Federation	Swimmers	Records			
Andorra		Federació Andorrana de Natació	Swimmers	Records	Open Andorra		Copa Andorra Natació
Argentina		Confederación Argentina de Deportes Acuáticos	Swimmers	Records	Argentine Championships		
Armenia		Water Kind Sports Association & Swimming Federation of Armenia	Swimmers	Records			
Australia	Overview	Swimming Australia	Swimmers	Records	Australian Championships	Australian SC Championships	
Austria		Austrian Swimming Federation	Swimmers	Records	Austrian Championships		
Azerbaijan		Azerbaijan Swimming Federation	Swimmers	Records			
Belarus		Belarusian Swimming Federation	Swimmers	Records			
Belgium		Royal Belgian Swimming Federation	Swimmers	Records	Belgian Championships	Belgian SC Championships	
Bosnia and Herzegovina		Swimming Association of Bosnia and Herzegovina	Swimmers	Records	Bosnian and Herzegovinian Championships		
Brazil		Confederação Brasileira de Desportos Aquáticos	Swimmers	Records	Brazilian Championships		Maria Lenk Trophy; José Finkel Trophy
Bulgaria		Bulgarian Swimming Federation	Swimmers	Records	Bulgarian Championships		
Canada			Swimmers	Records			
China		Chinese Swimming Association	Swimmers		Chinese Championships		
Croatia		Croatian Swimming Federation	Swimmers	Records	Croatian Championships	Croatian SC Championships	
Cyprus		Cyprus Swimming Federation	Swimmers	Records			
Czech Republic		Český svaz plaveckých sportů	Swimmers	Records			
Denmark		Danish Swimming Federation	Swimmers	Records	Danish Championships	Danish SC Championships	Danish Team Championships
Estonia		Estonian Swimming Federation	Swimmers	Records	Estonian Championships	Estonian SC Championships	
Faroe Islands		Faroe Islands Swimming Association	Swimmers	Records	Faroese Championships	Faroese SC Championships	
Finland		Suomen Uimaliitto	Swimmers	Records	Finnish Championships	Finnish SC Championships	
France		Fédération Française de Natation	Swimmers	Records	French Championships	French SC Championships; French Nationals	Interclubs
Georgia		Georgian Aquatic Sports National Federation	Swimmers	Records			
Germany		German Swimming Federation	Swimmers	Records	German Championships; German Winter Championships	German SC Championships	German Team Championships
Gibraltar		Gibraltar Amateur Swimming Association	Swimmers	Records			
Great Britain		British Swimming	Swimmers	Records	British Championships	British SC Championships	National Swimming League
Greece		Hellenic Swimming Federation	Swimmers	Records	Greek Championships		
Hungary		Hungarian Swimming Association	Swimmers	Records	Hungarian Championships	Hungarian SC Championships	
Iceland		Icelandic Swimming Association	Swimmers	Records	Icelandic Championships	Icelandic SC Championships	
Ireland		Swim Ireland	Swimmers	Records	Irish Open Championships	Irish Open SC Championships	
Israel		Israel Swimming Association	Swimmers	Records	Israeli Championships	Israeli SC Championships	
Italy		Federazione Italiana Nuoto	Swimmers	Records	Italian Championships	Italian SC Championships	Italian Team Championships
Jamaica				Records			
Japan		Japan Swimming Federation	Swimmers	Records	Japan Championships	Japan SC Championships	
Kosovo		Kosovo Swimming Federation	Swimmers	Records			
Latvia		Swimming Federation of Latvia	Swimmers	Records	Latvian Championships		
Liechtenstein		Liechtensteiner Schwimmverband	Swimmers	Records			
Lithuania		Lithuanian Swimming Federation	Swimmers	Records	Lithuanian Championships	Lithuanian SC Championships	
Luxembourg		Fédération Luxembourgeoise de Natation et de Sauvetage	Swimmers	Records			
North Macedonia		Swimming Federation of the Republic of Macedonia	Swimmers	Records			
Malta		Aquatic Sports Association of Malta	Swimmers	Records	Maltese Championships		
Mexico			Swimmers	Records			
Moldova		Water Kind of Sports Federation of the Republic of Moldova	Swimmers	Records			
Monaco		Fédération Monégasque de Natation	Swimmers	Records			
Montenegro		Water Polo and Swimming Federation of Montenegro	Swimmers	Records			
Netherlands		Royal Dutch Swimming Federation	Swimmers	Records	Dutch Championships	Dutch SC Championships	
New Zealand			Swimmers	Records			
Norway		Norwegian Swimming Federation	Swimmers	Records	Norwegian Championships	Norwegian SC Championships	
Poland		Polish Swimming Federation	Swimmers	Records	Polish Championships	Polish SC Championships	
Portugal		Federação Portuguesa de Natação	Swimmers	Records	Portuguese Championships		Portuguese Club Championships
Puerto Rico			Swimmers	Records			
Romania		Romanian Swimming & Modern Pentathlon Federation	Swimmers	Records	Romanian Championships	Romanian SC Championships	
Russia		Russian Swimming Federation	Swimmers	Records	Russian Championships	Russian SC Championships	
Saint Lucia				Records			
San Marino		Federazione Sammarinese Nuoto	Swimmers	Records	Sammarinese Championships		
Serbia		Serbian Swimming Federation	Swimmers	Records	Serbian Championships	Serbian SC Championships	
Slovakia		Slovenská plavecká federácia	Swimmers	Records	Slovak Championships	Slovak SC Championships	
Slovenia		Plavalna zveza Slovenije	Swimmers	Records			
Spain		Royal Spanish Swimming Federation	Swimmers	Records	Spanish Championships	Spanish SC Championships	Spanish Club Cup
Sweden	Overview	Swedish Swimming Federation	Swimmers	Records	Swedish Championships	Swedish SC Championships	
Switzerland		Swiss Swimming Federation	Swimmers	Records	Swiss Championships	Swiss SC Championships	
Turkey		Turkish Swimming Federation	Swimmers	Records	Turkish Championships	Turkish SC Championships	
Ukraine		Ukrainian Swimming Federation	Swimmers	Records	Ukrainian Championships		
United States		USA Swimming	Swimmers	Records	US Championships; US Spring Championships	US SC Championships	
Venezuela			Swimmers	Records			
