= Arenas Europe =

Group of indoor arenas in Europe

- Old logo of the group before it was renamed in 2026
- Formation: 1991
- Headquarters: Rotterdam Ahoy, Ahoyweg 10, 3084 BA Rotterdam, Netherlands
- Location: Europe
- Members: 48
- President: Robert Fitzpatrick
- Website: Arenas Europe

Arenas Europe (formerly the European Arenas Association (EAA)) is a group of indoor arenas located in Europe with a range of event hosting experiences, including concerts, entertainment productions, and sporting and corporate events. As of 2026, it is made up of 48 member arenas and arena clusters from 21 countries. Established in 1991, its headquarters are located at Rotterdam Ahoy in Rotterdam.

== Executive team ==
The Arenas Europe executive team includes its President Robert Fitzpatrick, who also serves as the Chairman of the Belfast Giants ice hockey team that plays at The O2 in Belfast, and Executive Officer Victoria Matthews.

Other executive team members, include:

- Central Region – Olivier Toth, Chief Executive Officer of Rockhal, Esch-sur-Alzette, Luxembourg (also serves as President Emeritus of the EAA)
- East Region – Konrad Koziol, Vice President of the Management Board of Gliwice Arena, Gliwice, Poland
- North Region – Charlotte Lechtaler, Business Developer at Got Event (owners of Scandinavium), Gothenburg, Sweden
- South Region – Renzo Cannabona, Chief Sales and Marketing Officer of the Hallenstadion, Zurich, Switzerland
- West Region – Debbie Mc Williams, Chief Commercial Officer of the OVO Hydro, Glasgow, United Kingdom

== Venues ==
As of 2026, the Arenas Europe website listed 45 member arenas and 3 arena clusters from across 21 European nations. The website lists the neighbouring Porsche-Arena and Hanns-Martin-Schleyer-Halle in Stuttgart and the Velodrom and Max-Schmeling-Halle in Berlin together, and the entire Stockholm Live group is listed as one entry.

=== Arenas ===
Region	Country	Arena	Location
Central	Austria	Wiener Stadthalle	Vienna
Central	Belgium	Forest National	Brussels
Central	France	Accor Arena	Paris
Central	France	LDLC Arena	Décines-Charpieu (Note: Labeled as Lyon in the Arenas Europe website.)
Central	France	Plenitude Arena	Nanterre (Note: Labeled as Paris in the Arenas Europe website.)
Central	Germany	Barclays Arena	Hamburg
Central	Germany	Festhalle Frankfurt	Frankfurt
Central	Germany	Olympiapark	Munich
Central	Germany	Uber Arena	Berlin
Central	Luxembourg	Rockhal	Esch-sur-Alzette
Central	Netherlands	Rotterdam Ahoy	Rotterdam
East	Czech Republic	O2 Arena	Prague
East	Estonia	Unibet Arena	Tallinn
East	Latvia	Xiaomi Arena	Riga
East	Lithuania	Arena Vilnius	Vilnius
East	Lithuania	Žalgirio Arena	Kaunas
East	Poland	Atlas Arena	Łódź
East	Poland	Ergo Arena	Gdańsk/Sopot (Note: Labeled as Gdańsk in the Arenas Europe website.)
East	Poland	PreZero Arena Gliwice	Gliwice
East	Poland	Tauron Arena Kraków	Kraków
North	Denmark	Royal Arena	Copenhagen
North	Finland	Nokia Arena	Tampere
North	Finland	Veikkaus Arena	Helsinki
North	Norway	Unity Arena	Fornebu (Note: Labeled as Oslo in the Arenas Europe website.)
North	Sweden	Malmö Arena	Malmö
North	Sweden	Scandinavium	Gothenburg
South	Hungary	László Papp Budapest Sports Arena	Budapest
South	Hungary	MVM Dome	Budapest
South	Italy	Inalpi Arena	Turin
South	Italy	Unipol Dome	Milan
South	Italy	Unipol Forum	Assago (Note: Labeled as Milan in the Arenas Europe website.)
South	Portugal	MEO Arena	Lisbon
South	Spain	Movistar Arena	Madrid
South	Spain	Navarra Arena	Pamplona
South	Spain	Palacio Vistalegre	Madrid
South	Spain	Palau Sant Jordi	Barcelona
South	Spain	Roig Arena	Valencia
South	Switzerland	Hallenstadion	Zurich
South	Switzerland	St. Jakobshalle	Münchenstein (Note: Labeled as Basel in the Arenas Europe website.)
West	United Kingdom	AO Arena	Manchester
West	United Kingdom	bp pulse LIVE	Solihull (Note: Labeled as Birmingham in the Arenas Europe website.)
West	United Kingdom	Co-op Live	Manchester
West	United Kingdom	The O2 Arena	London
West	United Kingdom	The O2 Belfast	Belfast
West	United Kingdom	OVO Arena Wembley	London
West	United Kingdom	OVO Hydro	Glasgow

=== Arena clusters ===
Region	Country	Arena	Location
Central	Germany	Hanns-Martin-Schleyer-Halle and Porsche-Arena	Stuttgart
Central	Germany	Velomax: Max-Schmeling-Halle; Velodrom	Berlin
North	Sweden	Stockholm Live: 3Arena; Annexet; Avicii Arena; Hovet; Södra Teatern; Strawberry Arena	Stockholm

=== Former members ===
The following arenas were once listed on the EAA website as members, but were removed.

Country	Arena	Location
Croatia	Arena Zagreb	Zagreb
Finland	Gatorade Center	Turku
Germany	PSD Bank Dome	Düsseldorf
Hungary	Főnix Aréna	Debrecen
Italy	Palazzo dello Sport	Rome
Serbia	Belgrade Arena	Belgrade
United Kingdom	Utilita Arena Birmingham	Birmingham

== Events ==
Lisbon's MEO Arena hosted the MTV Europe Music Awards in 2005, Eurovision in 2018, and has hosted Mark Knopfler, Bruno Mars, Kylie Minogue, Roger Waters, and Robbie Williams.

The Rotterdam Ahoy has twice held the MTV Europe Music Awards, firstly in 1997 and subsequently in 2016, the 2021 staging of Eurovision, and concerts performed by Jennifer Lopez, U2, and Justin Bieber.

The Scandinavium in Gothenburg is a 4-time home to the Davis Cup final—firstly in 1984, then 1987 and 1988, and most recently in 1997. It also mounted the 1985 edition of Eurovision and welcomed The Rolling Stones, Whitney Houston, and Stevie Wonder.

Parisian venue—the Accor Arena hosted artistic gymnastics, basketball matches, and trampolining events during the 2024 Summer Olympics, as well as the 2002 Davis Cup final. The venue has seen Prince "put on a show" with Stevie Wonder and welcomed Madonna and Paul McCartney… Roger Waters and Peter Gabriel.

London's OVO Arena served as the host venue for the MTV Europe Music Awards in 2017 and hosted sports during both the 1948 and 2012 Summer Olympics. The arena has hosted many musicians, including: Madonna, David Bowie, and The Who… Dolly Parton, Stevie Wonder, and Prince. The Beatles and The Rolling Stones have appeared together on the same bill.
