= Simhallsbadet =

Simhallsbadet may refer to:

1. Simhallsbadet, Malmö, a swimming complex in Malmö, Sweden, 1988–2015 known as Aq-va-kul
2. Simhallsbadet, Helsingborg, swimming venue in Helsingborg, Sweden
