= Swedish Short Course Swimming Championships =

Short course swimming competition held in Sweden

- Sport: Swimming
- Founded: 1953
- No. of teams: 65 (2006)
- Country: Sweden
- Most recent champion(s): Last winners lists

The Swedish Short Course Swimming Championships (Swedish: Svenska mästerskapen i kortbanesimning) are annually in late November in an indoor 25m pool. The championships sometimes also works as trials for the World Championships and European Short Course Swimming Championships. Swimmers representing Swedish swim teams may participate. Non-Swedish swimmers who have participated include Anthony Ervin and Attila Czene.

== History ==
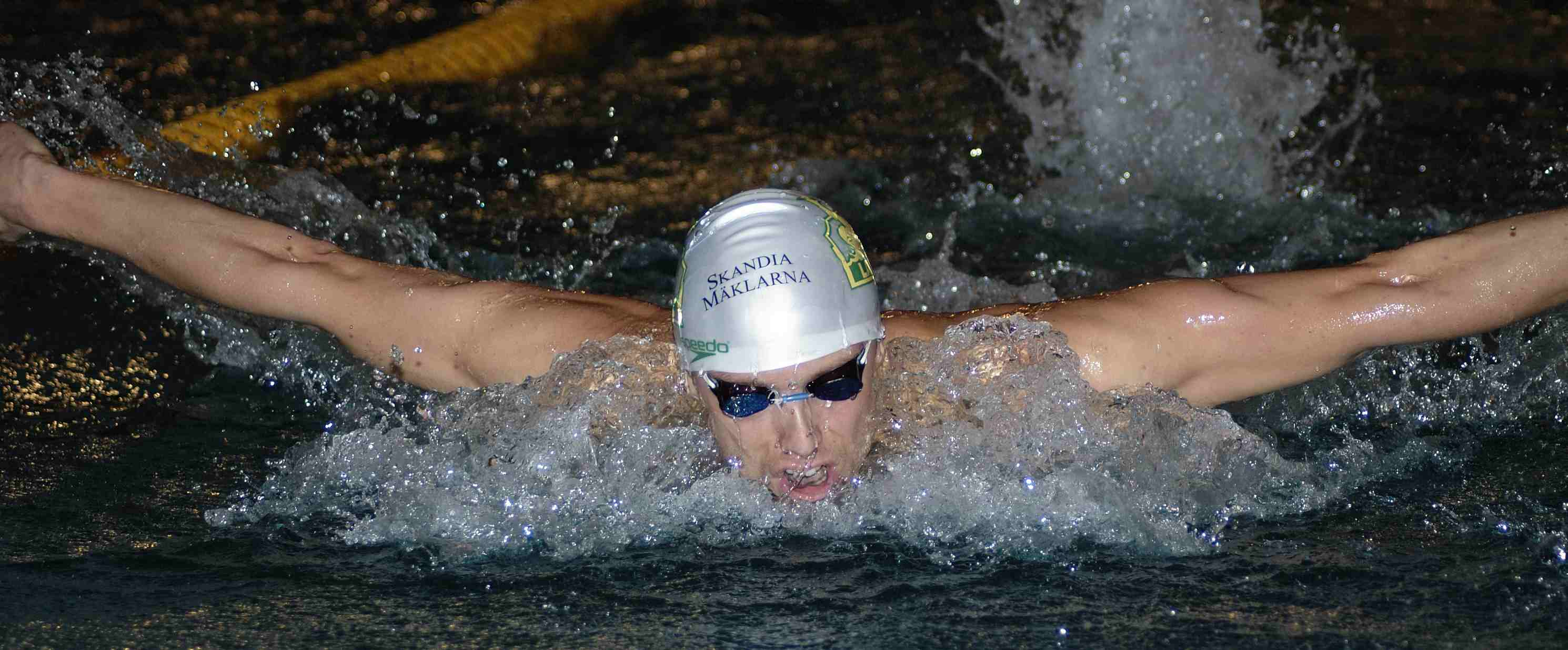
Lars Frölander at the 2006 Swedish Short Course Swimming Championships in Uppsala.

The first Swedish Short Course Swimming Championships was swum in 1953 in Stockholm, but the first Swedish Swimming Championship was held in 1899.

On the first championship, the events were 50 m freestyle, 200 m backstroke, 100 m butterfly and 4×50 m freestyle relay for men and women. Swimmers from SK Neptun won three of the events, while SK Poseidon's swimmers won two.

Two times the Short Course Championships has been swum in long course in pools, in 1988, when it worked as 1988 Summer Olympics trials and in 1990, when it worked as 1991 World Aquatics Championships trials.

The swimmer with the most individual gold medals is Therese Alshammar (41 titles), Anders Holmertz (33), Agneta Eriksson (24) and Thomas Lejdström and Johanna Sjöberg (both 20). Of them, Therese Alshammar is the only swimmer still active.

== Champions ==
Name	Clubs	Titles	Years	Best event (titles)
Therese Alshammar	Järfälla SS, SK Neptun, Helsingborgs SS	41	1991–2006	50 m backstroke (12)
Anders Holmertz	Motala SS, Spårvägens SF	33	1984–1997	400 m freestyle (14)
Agneta Eriksson	Västerås SS	24	1980–1987	100 m freestyle, 200 m freestyle, 100 m butterfly (all 7)
Thomas Lejdström	Västerås SS	20	1979–1985	400 m IM (6)
Johanna Sjöberg	Helsingborgs SS, Södertälje SS, Spårvägens SF	20	1995–2005	100 m butterfly (9)
Malin Nilsson	Malmö KK, Simavdelningen 1902	17	1990–1995	400 m freestyle, 800 m freestyle (both 6)
Peter Berggren	Skärets SS	15	1980–1989	100 m breaststroke (8)
Louise Karlsson	Skärets SS, Helsingborgs SS	15	1990–1997	50 m breaststroke (4)
Annelie Holmström	Stockholmspolisens IF	14	1980–1986	100 m breaststroke (8)
Lars Frölander	Borlänge SS, Sundsvalls SS, Linköpings ASS	14	1992–2006	100 m butterfly (7)
Josefin Lillhage	Simavdelningen 1902, Göteborg Sim, Väsby SS	14	1996–2006	200 m freestyle, 400 m freestyle (both 6)
Anita Zarnowiecki	Simavdelningen 1902	13	1969–1975	400 m IM (4)
Pär Arvidsson	Finspångs SK	13	1977–1983	100 m butterfly, 200 m butterfly (both 5)
Bengt Baron	Finspångs SK	13	1979–1984	100 m backstroke (6)
Malin Svahnström	Väsby SS	13	1996–2005	200 m IM (5)

== Venues ==
- 1953 – Stockholm
- 1954 – Stockholm
- 1955 – Stockholm
- 1956 – Valhallabadet, Gothenburg
- 1957 – Simhallsbadet, Malmö
- 1958 – Stockholm
- 1959 – Simhallsbadet, Helsingborg
- 1960 – Stockholm
- 1961 – Gävle
- 1962 – Valhallabadet, Gothenburg
- 1963 – Simhallsbadet, Malmö
- 1964 – Kristianborgsbadet, Västerås
- 1965 – Kristinehamn
- 1966 – Simhallsbadet, Helsingborg
- 1967 – Kristianborgsbadet, Västerås
- 1968 – Halmstad
- 1969 – Maserhallen, Borlänge
- 1970 – Linköpings simhall, Linköping
- 1971 – Sporthallsbadet, Sundsvall
- 1972 – Umeå simhall, Umeå
- 1973 – Växjö simhall, Växjö
- 1974 – Linköpings simhall, Linköping
- 1975 – Lugnets simhall, Falun
- 1976 – Valhallabadet, Gothenburg
- 1977 – Umeå simhall, Umeå
- 1978 – Simhallsbadet, Malmö
- 1979 – Kristianborgsbadet, Västerås
- 1980 – Maserhallen, Borlänge
- 1981 – Linköpings simhall, Linköping
- 1982 – Valhallabadet, Gothenburg
- 1983 – Jakobsbergs simhall, Järfälla
- 1984 – Centralbadet, Norrköping
- 1985 – Sporthallsbadet, Sundsvall
- 1986 – Simhallsbadet, Malmö
- 1987 – Linköpings simhall, Linköping
- 1988 – Gustavsviksbadet, Örebro (LCM)
- 1989 – Aq-Va-Kul, Malmö
- 1990 – Valhallabadet, Gothenburg (LCM)
- 1991 – Sydpoolen, Södertälje
- 1992 – Centralbadet, Norrköping
- 1993 – Linköpings simhall, Linköping
- 1994 – Sporthallsbadet, Sundsvall
- 1995 – Växjö simhall, Växjö
- 1996 – Sporthallsbadet, Sundsvall
- 1997 – Kristianborgsbadet, Västerås
- 1998 – Tivolibadet, Kristianstad
- 1999 – Sydpoolen, Södertälje
- 2000 – Eriksdalsbadet, Stockholm
- 2001 – Aq-Va-Kul, Malmö
- 2002 – Valhallabadet, Gothenburg
- 2003 – Eriksdalsbadet, Stockholm
- 2004 – Aq-Va-Kul, Malmö
- 2005 – Valhallabadet, Gothenburg
- 2006 – Fyrishov, Uppsala
- 2007 – Rosenlundsbadet, Jönköping
- 2008 – Aq-Va-Kul, Malmö
- 2009 – Gothenburg
- 2010 – Stockholm
- 2011 – Stockholm
- 2012 – Helsingborg
- 2013 – Gothenburg
- 2014 – Stockholm
- 2015 – Helsingborg

== See also ==
- Swedish Swimming Grand Prix series
- Swedish Swimming Championships
- List of sporting events in Sweden
