= Swedish Sports Awards =

Annual sports ceremony in Sweden

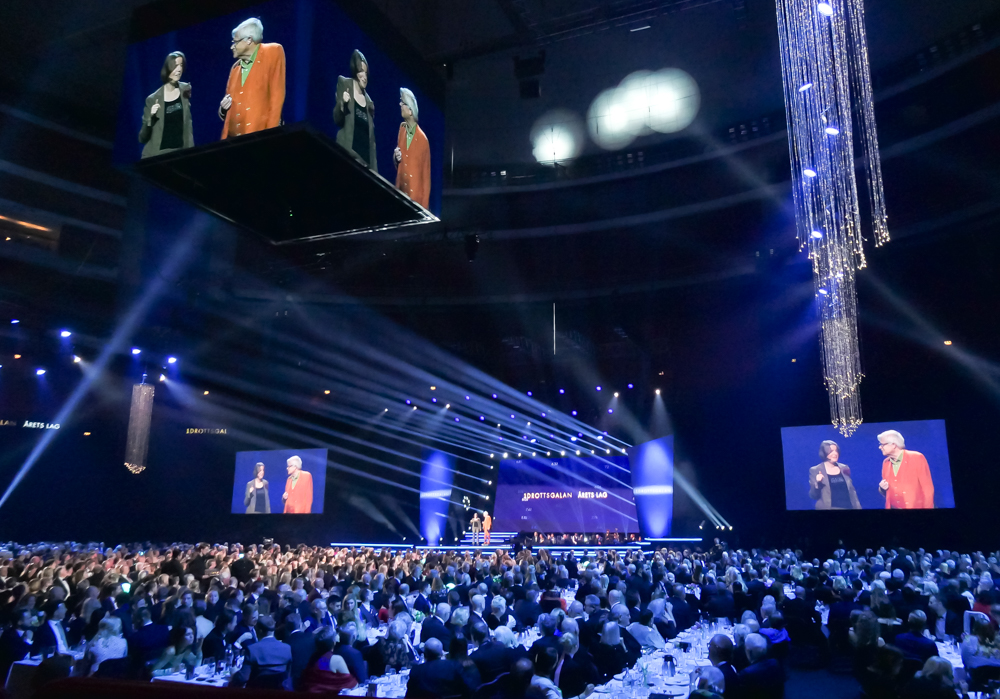
- Awarded for: Excellence in sports
- Location: Ericsson Globe, Stockholm
- Country: Sweden
- First award: 2000
- Website: idrottsgalan.se

Television/radio coverage
- Network: Sveriges Television (SVT)

The Swedish Sports Awards (Swedish: Svenska idrottsgalan) is a show to honor the past year's Swedish sports and athletes' achievements. It is hosted annually at Ericsson Globe in Stockholm in mid or late January. The event was first held in the year 2000.

In the years 2021 and 2022, the event was held in Annexet instead, following the Coronavirus pandemic reducing the number of spectators.

== Awards and winners ==
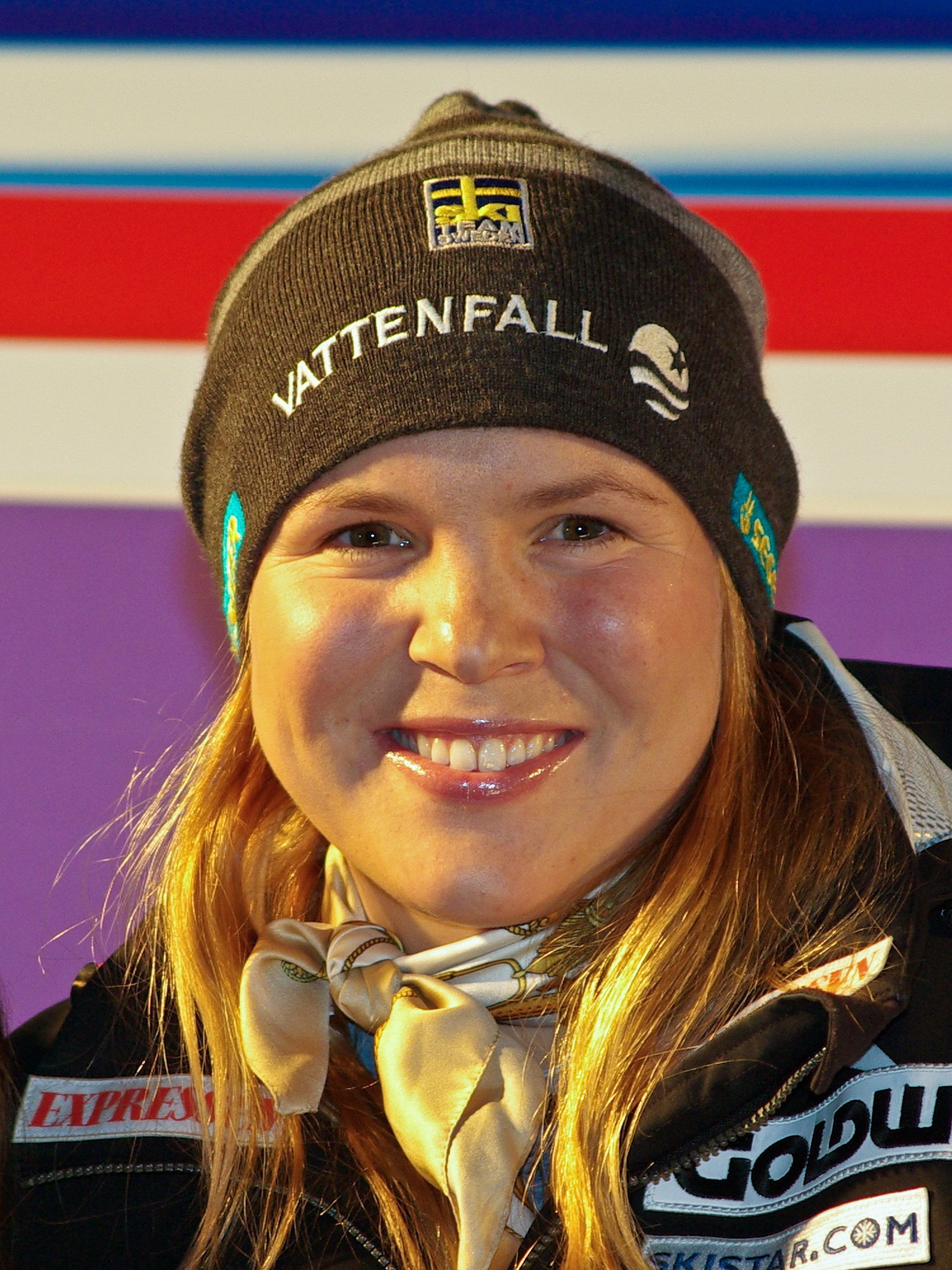
Anja Pärson (alpine skiing)

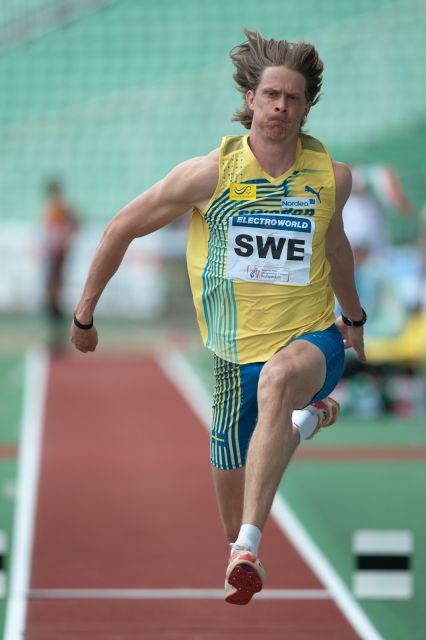
Christian Olsson (athletics)

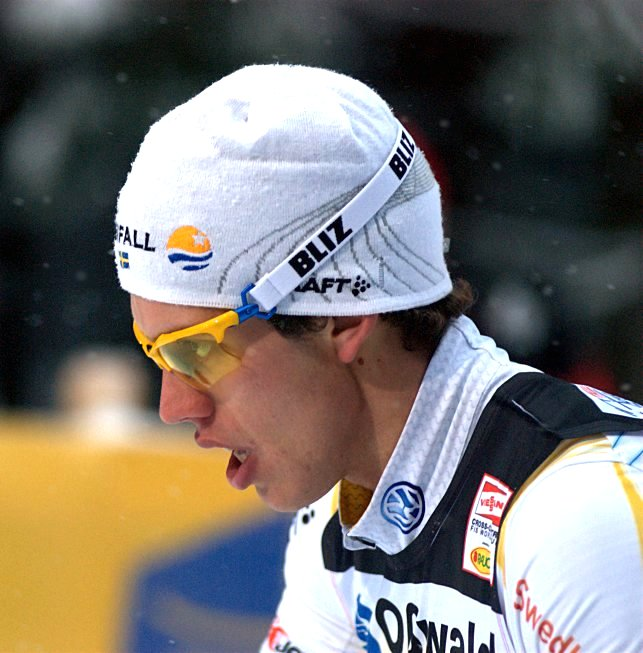
Marcus Hellner (cross-country skiing)

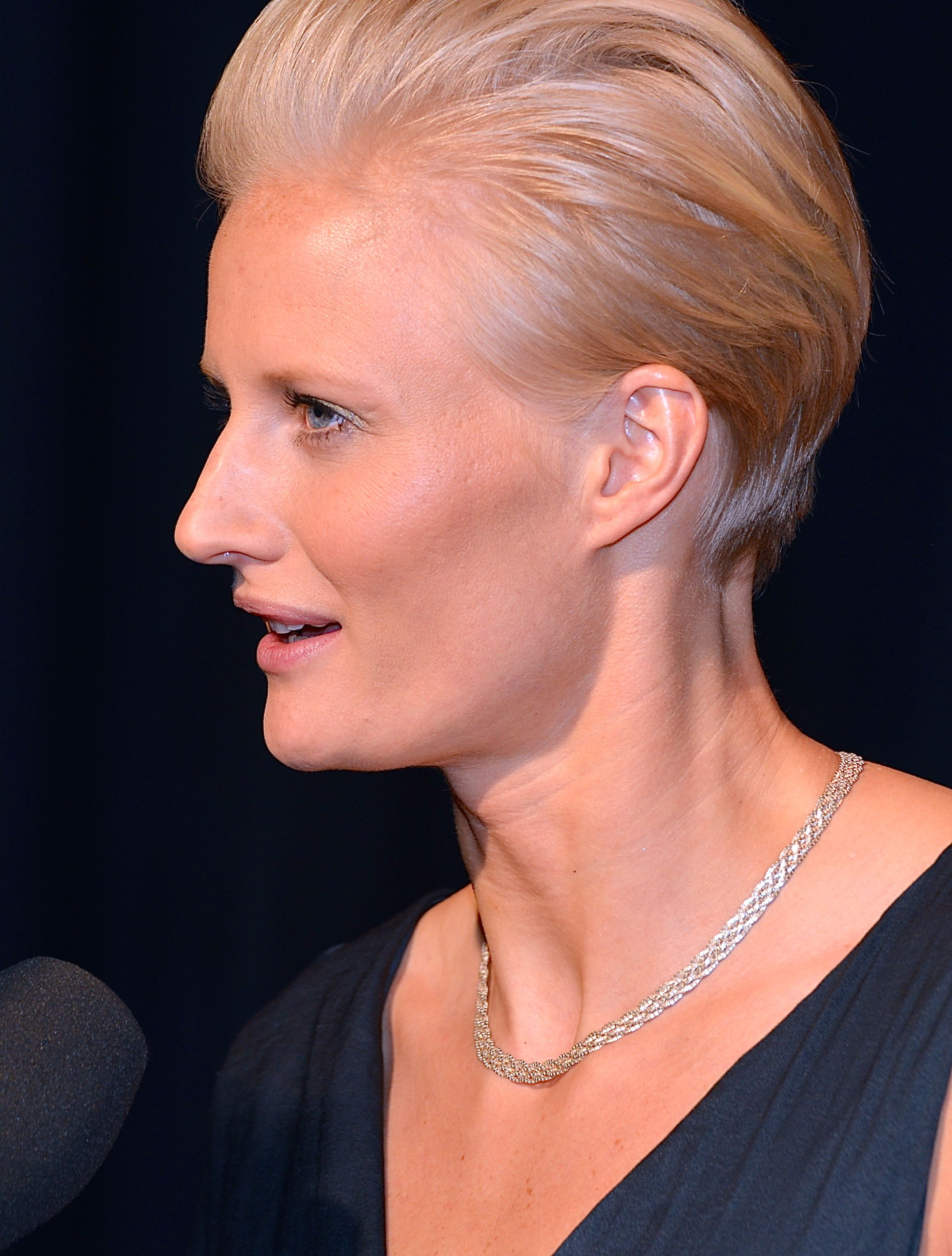
Carolina Klüft (athletics)

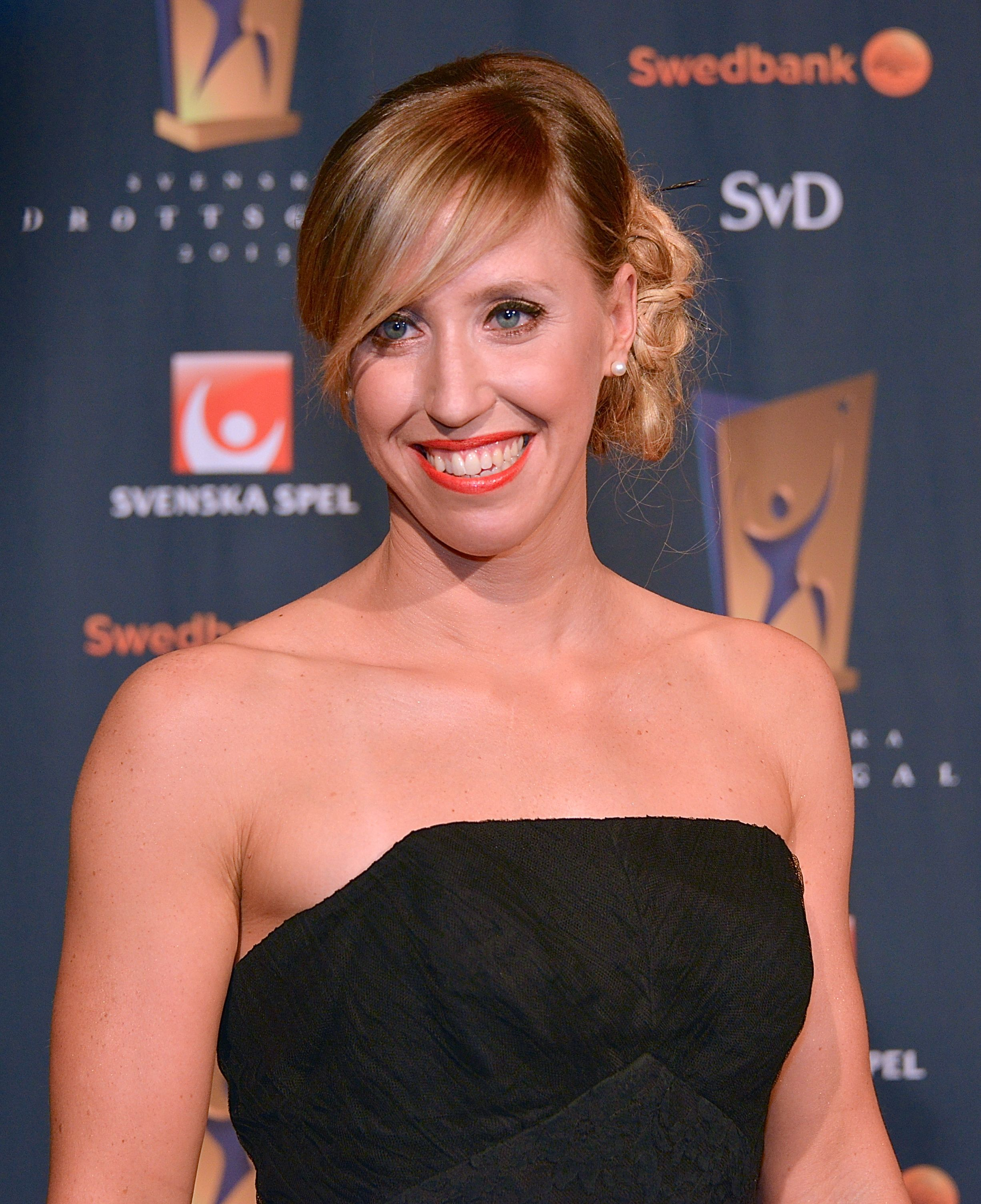
Lisa Nordén (triathlon)

=== Sportswoman of the Year ===
Year	Winner	Sport
2000	Ludmila Engquist	Athletics
2001	Therese Alshammar	Swimming
2002	Annika Sörenstam	Golf
2003	Kajsa Bergqvist	Athletics
2004	Annika Sörenstam (2)	Golf
2005	Carolina Klüft	Athletics
2006	Anja Pärson	Alpine skiing
2007	Anna Carin Olofsson	Biathlon
2008	Anja Pärson (2)	Alpine skiing
2009	Emma Johansson	Cycling
2010	Helena Jonsson	Biathlon
2011	Charlotte Kalla	Cross-country skiing
2012	Therese Alshammar (2)	Swimming
2013	Lisa Nordén	Triathlon
2014	Abeba Aregawi	Athletics
2015	Charlotte Kalla (2)	Cross-country skiing
2016	Sarah Sjöström	Swimming
2017	Sarah Sjöström (2)	Swimming
2018	Sarah Sjöström (3)	Swimming
2019	Sarah Sjöström (4)	Swimming
2020	Tove Alexandersson	Orienteering
2021	Linn Svahn	Cross-country skiing
2022	Tove Alexandersson (2)	Orienteering
2023	Sarah Sjöström (5)	Swimming
2024	Sarah Sjöström (6)	Swimming
2025	Sarah Sjöström (7)	Swimming
2026	Jonna Sundling	Cross-country skiing

=== Sportsman of the Year ===
Year	Winner	Sport
2000	Lars Frölander	Swimming
2001	Lars Frölander (2)	Swimming
2002	Per Elofsson	Cross-country skiing
2003	Christian Olsson	Athletics
2004	Christian Olsson (2)	Athletics
2005	Stefan Holm	Athletics
2006	Tony Rickardsson	Motorcycle speedway
2007	Björn Lind	Cross-country skiing
2008	Zlatan Ibrahimović	Football
2009	Robert Karlsson	Golf
2010	Zlatan Ibrahimović (2)	Football
2011	Marcus Hellner	Cross-country skiing
2012	Marcus Hellner (2)	Cross-country skiing
2013	Zlatan Ibrahimović (3)	Football
2014	Henrik Stenson	Golf
2015	Zlatan Ibrahimović (4)	Football
2016	Johan Olsson	Cross-country skiing
2017	Henrik Stenson	Golf
2018	Daniel Ståhl	Athletics
2019	Armand Duplantis	Athletics
2020	Daniel Ståhl (2)	Athletics
2021	Armand Duplantis (2)	Athletics
2022	Armand Duplantis (3)	Athletics
2023	Nils van der Poel	Speed skating
2024	Armand Duplantis (4)	Athletics
2025	Armand Duplantis (5)	Athletics
2026	Armand Duplantis (6)	Athletics

=== Team of the Year ===
Year	Winner	Sport
2000	Men's national team	Handball
2001	Men's national team	Table tennis
2002	Men's national team	Football
2003	Men's national team (2)	Handball
2004	Women's national team	Football
2005	Henrik Nilsson and Markus Oscarsson	Canoeing
2006	Men's national team (2)	Football
2007	Men's national team	Ice hockey
2008	C. J. Bergman, B. Ferry, H. Jonsson and A. Olofsson	Biathlon
2009	Thomas Johansson and Simon Aspelin	Tennis
2010	Robert Karlsson and Henrik Stenson	Golf
2011	M. Hellner, J. Olsson, D. Richardsson and A. Södergren	Cross-country skiing
2012	Ida Ingemarsdotter and Charlotte Kalla	Cross-country skiing
2013	Fredrik Lööf and Max Salminen	Sailing
2014	Men's national team (2)	Ice hockey
2015	A. Haag, I. Ingemarsdotter, C. Kalla and E. Wikén	Cross-country skiing
2016	Men's national under-21 team	Football
2017	Women's national team (2)	Football
2018	Men's national team (3)	Ice hockey
2019	P. Femling, J. Nelin, S. Samuelsson, F. Lindström	Biathlon
2020	E. Andersson, F. Karlsson, C. Kalla and S. Nilsson	Cross-country skiing
2021	Team Hasselborg: A. Hasselborg, S. McManus, A. Knochenhauer, S. Mabergs and J. Heldin	Curling
2022	Malin Baryard-Johnsson, Henrik von Eckermann and Peder Fredricson	Equestrianism
2023	Kristian Karlsson and Mattias Falck	Table tennis
2024	Jonatan Hellvig and David Åhman	Beach volleyball
2025	Jonatan Hellvig and David Åhman (2)	Beach volleyball
2026	Mjällby AIF	Football

=== Coach of the Year ===
Year	Winner	Sport
2000	Bengt Johansson	Handball
2001	Hans Chrunak	Swimming
2002	Sven-Göran Eriksson	Football
2003	Ulf Karlsson	Athletics
2004	Ulf Karlsson (2)	Athletics
2005	Yannick Tregaro	Athletics
2006	Yannick Tregaro (2)	Athletics
2007	Bengt-Åke Gustafsson	Ice hockey
2008	Anders Pärson	Alpine skiing
2009	Nanne Bergstrand	Football
2010	Staffan Eklund	Biathlon
2011	Joakim Abrahamsson and Magnus Ingesson	Cross-country skiing
2012	Per Johansson	Handball
2013	Pia Sundhage	Football
2014	Pär Mårts	Ice hockey
2015	Rikard Grip	Cross-country skiing
2016	Håkan Ericson	Football
2017	Lars Lagerbäck	Football
2018	Graham Potter	Football
2019	Janne Andersson	Football
2020	Peter Gerhardsson	Football
2021	Greg and Helena Duplantis	Athletics
2022	Vésteinn Hafsteinsson	Athletics
2023	Johan Röjler	Speed skating
2024	Johannes Lukas	Biathlon
2025	Jörgen Persson	Table tennis
2026	Greg and Helena Duplantis (2)	Athletics

=== Newcomer of the Year ===
Year	Winner	Sport
2000	Anna-Karin Kammerling	Swimming
2001	Jonas Edman	Shooting
2002	Susanna Kallur	Athletics
2003	Kim Källström	Football
2004	Linus Thörnblad	Athletics
2005	Joachim Johansson	Tennis
2006	Emma Green	Athletics
2007	Nicklas Bäckström	Ice hockey
2008	Jens Byggmark	Alpine skiing
2009	Sarah Sjöström	Swimming
2010	Jonas Jerebko	Basketball
2011	Angelica Bengtsson	Athletics
2012	Moa Hjelmer	Athletics
2013	Gabriel Landeskog	Ice hockey
2014	Irene Ekelund	Athletics
2015	Sandra Näslund	Ski cross
2016	Khaddi Sagnia	Athletics
2017	Jesper Svensson	Bowling
2018	Armand Duplantis	Athletics
2019	Elias Pettersson	Ice hockey
2020	Frida Karlsson	Cross-country skiing
2021	Dejan Kulusevski	Football
2022	Maja Åskag	Athletics
2023	Linn Grant	Golf
2024	Ludvig Åberg	Golf
2025	Tara Babulfath	Judo
2026	Elmer Andersson and Jacob Hölting Nilsson	Beach volleyball

=== Performance of the Year ===
Year	Winner	Sport
2000	Ludmila Engquist	Athletics
2001	Lars Frölander	Swimming
2002	Christian Olsson	Athletics
2003	Carolina Klüft	Athletics
2004	Carolina Klüft (2)	Athletics
2005	Stefan Holm	Athletics
2006	Kajsa Bergqvist	Athletics
2007	Anette Norberg	Curling
2008	Carolina Klüft (3)	Athletics
2009	Charlotte Kalla	Cross-country skiing
2010	Sarah Sjöström	Swimming
2011	Björn Ferry	Biathlon
2012	Therese Alshammar	Swimming
2013	Lisa Nordén	Triathlon
2014	Johan Olsson	Cross-country skiing
2015	A. Haag, I. Ingemarsdotter, C. Kalla and E. Wikén	Cross-country skiing
2016	Men's national under-21 team	Football
2017	Jenny Rissveds	Cross-country cycling
2018	Östersunds FK	Football
2019	Armand Duplantis	Athletics
2020	Mattias Falck	Table tennis
2021	Armand Duplantis (2)	Athletics
2022	Nils van der Poel	Speed skating
2023	Nils van der Poel (2)	Speed skating
2024	Daniel Ståhl	Athletics
2025	Armand Duplantis (3)	Athletics
2026	Daniel Ståhl (2)	Athletics

=== Lifetime Achievement Award ===
Year	Winner	Sport/Profession
2003	Lennart Johansson	President of UEFA
2004	Sven Pettersson	Journalist
2005	Ingemar Johansson	Boxing
2006	Not awarded	
2007	Not awarded	
2008	Sven Tumba	Ice hockey
2009	Arne Ljungqvist	Leader in Athletics
2010	Not awarded	
2011	Ingemar Stenmark	Alpine skiing
2012	Not awarded	
2013	Toini Gustafsson Rönnlund	Cross-country skiing
2014	Not awarded	
2015	Not awarded	
2016	Peter Forsberg, Nicklas Lidström, Mats Sundin	Ice hockey
2017	Jan-Ove Waldner	Table tennis
2018	Not awarded	
2019	Pernilla Wiberg	Alpine skiing
2020	Annika Sörenstam	Golf
2021	Mats Wilander	Tennis
2022	Not awarded	
2023	Magdalena Forsberg	Biathlon
2024	Not awarded	
2025	Gunde Svan	Cross-country skiing
2026	Anders Gärderud	Athletics

=== Sportsperson of the century ===
Year	Winner	Sport
2000	Björn Borg	Tennis

=== Svenska Spel and the Swedish Sportjournalist Federation's Grant ===
Year	Winner	Sport
2015	Mattias Löw	Women's Ice hockey

== See also ==
- Radiosportens Jerringpris
- Svenska Dagbladet Gold Medal
