= Swedish Swimming Federation =

Sports governing body in Sweden

Sweden Aquatics Svenska Simförbundet
- Sport: swimming, diving, synchronised swimming, water polo and open water swimming
- Abbreviation: SSF
- Founded: 23 March 1904
- Affiliation: International Swimming Federation (FINA); European Swimming League (LEN)
- Location: Stockholm, Sweden
- President: Pia Zätterström

Official website
- www.svensksimidrott.se
- (Sweden)

The Swedish Swimming Federation (Swedish: Svenska Simförbundet, SSF) is the national federation for Aquatics in body of Swimming in Sweden, as well as the other Aquatics sports: diving, synchronized swimming, water polo and open water swimming. It was founded on 23 March 1904 and is a member of LEN and FINA.

== Competitions ==
The Swedish Swimming Federation organizes the Swedish Swimming Championships, Swedish Short Course Swimming Championships, the Elitserien, the Women's Elitserien, the Swedish Synchronized Swimming Championships, the Swedish Diving Championships, the Swedish Swimming Grand Prix series and the Swedish Open Water Swimming Championships, national junior and youth championships and the national teams in the swimming disciplines. Current head coach for the Swedish swimming national team is Martina Aronsson, while the head coach for the diving team is Ulrika Knape.

Since 1904, SSF's national team athletes have won many international medals at the European Championship, the World Championship and at the Olympics.

== Organisation ==
The Swedish Swimming Federation aims to renew and evolve their organization, their competition- and support committees make plans for activities in 4-years cycles, between two Olympic games. SSF:s record have, as a few other federations, three times been rewarded with the award “Sports association of the year” (1972, 1980 and 1999).

SSF trains mostly national teams in swimming sports; they are in charge of the development of activities and leadership training and arrange the highest leadership training available. SSF have more than 330 members – competition associations and none competition associations, organizes in 11 swimming districts all over the country.

One of the federation's highest prioritized area is facility questions, this is because the membership associations wants opportunity to practise and develop swimming sports activities in regulatory facilities. SSF:s vision about facility questions is “at least one swimming sports facility in every municipality”. The Swimming Federations membership associations should be able to operate and develop the activities of swimming, synchronized swimming, diving and water polo. It requires facilities that are tailored to the individual swimming activities needs and rules for each competitive sport.

Another over arching goal is also that “there should be more facilities that meet the requirements for national and international championships and is more geographically diverse in the country, compared to 2008”.

== See also ==
- Simborgarmärket, a badge awarded by the Swedish Swimming Federation
