= Swimming in Sweden =

Overview of swimming sports practiced in Sweden

Swimming is a popular activity in Sweden. The Swedish Swimming Federation has about 300 member clubs and about 12,000 licensed swimmers.

== History ==
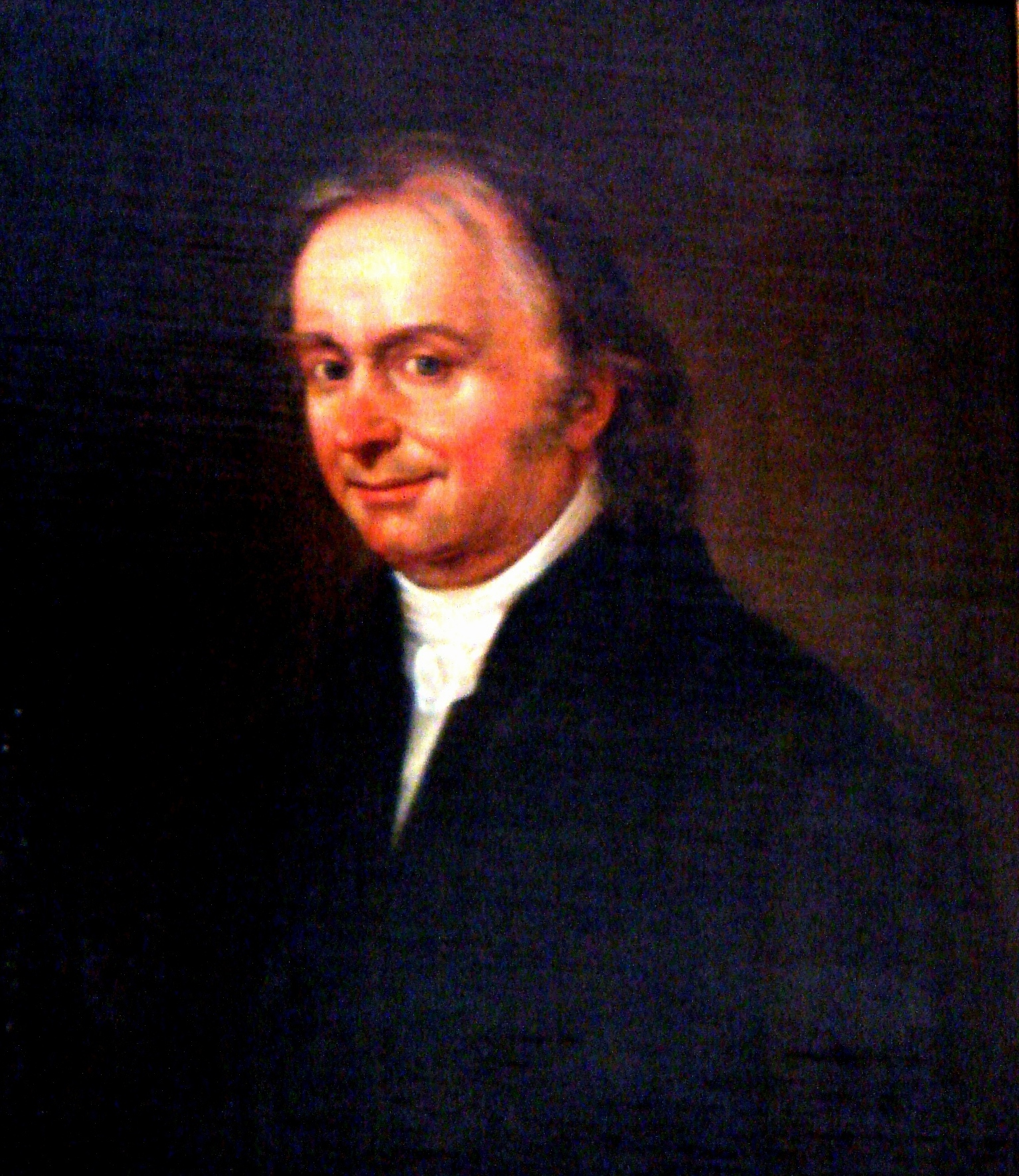
Jöns Svanberg, founder of Upsala SS

The history of modern swimming in Sweden starts in Uppsala, where professors from the Uppsala University start swimming education and grading for men. The first Swedish swimming club, Upsala SS, was started in 1796 by Jöns Svanberg. At that time swimming clubs organised swimming graduation ceremonies (Swedish: simpromotion); Karlfors SS in Värmland County had one in 1819.

Swimming clubs to organise swimming education, swimming graduation ceremonies and shows were founded in 1823 in Lund, in 1824 in Linköping (Linköpings ASS) and in 1827 in Stockholm. The first competitive swimming club were Stockholms ASF (founded 1885), then Stockholms KK and Uppsala KK (both founded 1895). Upsala SS allowed educational swimming for women in 1880 and began competitive swimming in 1910.

In 1899, the first Swedish Swimming Championships was held. The Swedish Swimming Federation was founded in 1904. The Swedish Swimming Federation was one of the federations that founded FINA during the 1908 Summer Olympics.

== International competitions ==
Sweden organized the third FINA Short Course Swimming Championships in Scandinavium in Gothenburg in 1997. Sweden took three gold medals.

Rosenlundsbadet in Jönköping was venue for the 1977 European Aquatics Championships.

Both Malmö and Stockholm has organized meets in the FINA Swimming World Cup.

== National competitions ==
=== Swedish Swimming Championships ===
The Swedish Swimming Championships (Swedish: Svenska Mästerskapen i simning, SM i simning, Sim-SM, Långbane-SM) are held annually in the Swedish summer in outdoor 50 m pool. The championships sometimes also works as trials for the Summer Olympics, World Championships and European Championships. Swimmers representing Swedish swim teams may participate.

=== Swedish Short Course Swimming Championships ===
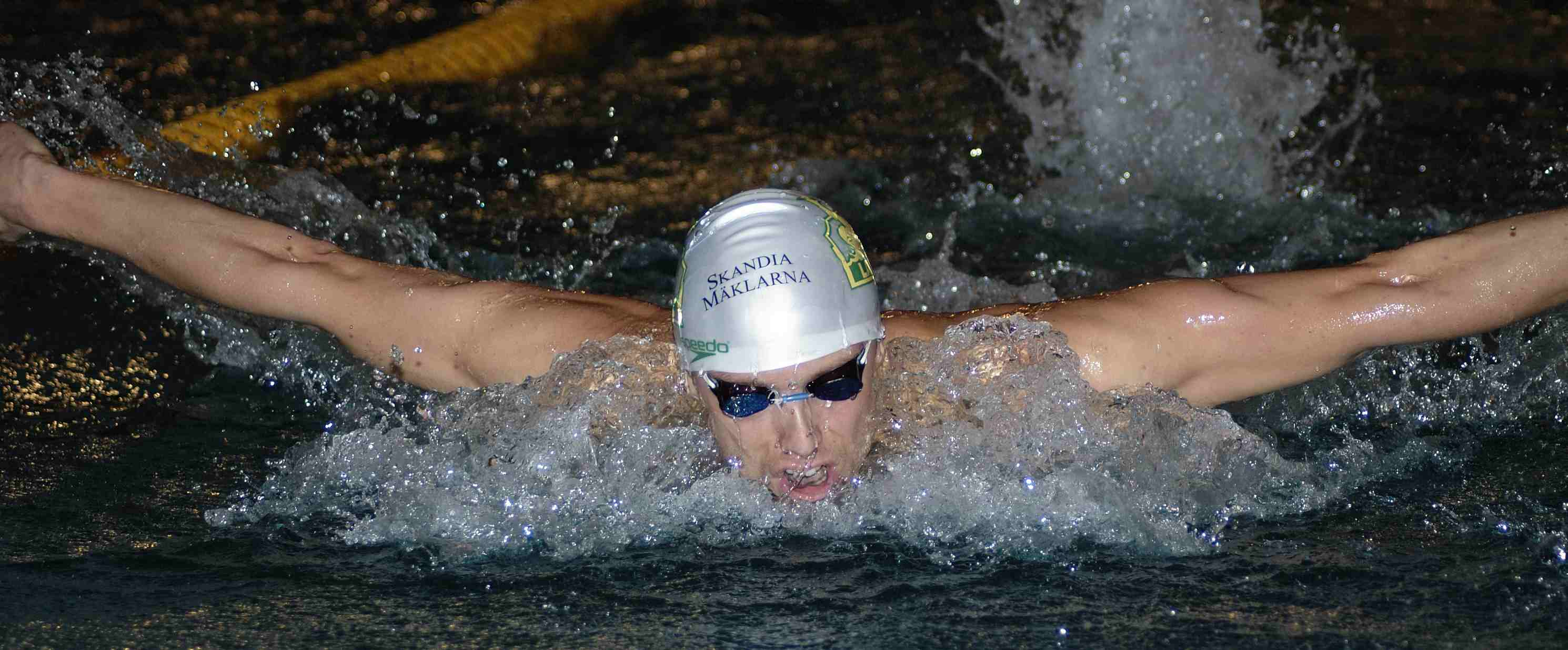
Lars Frölander at the 2006 Swedish Short Course Swimming Championships in Uppsala.

The Swedish Short Course Swimming Championships (Swedish: Svenska Mästerskapen i simning, SM i simning, Sim-SM, Kortbane-SM) are annually in late November in an indoor 25m pool. The championships sometimes also works as trials for the World Championships and European Short Course Swimming Championships. Swimmers representing Swedish swim teams may participate. Non-Swedish swimmers who have participated include Anthony Ervin and Attila Czene.

=== Swedish Junior's Swimming Championships ===
The Swedish Junior's Swimming Championships (Swedish: Svenska Juniormästerskapen i simning, JSM i simning) are held twice a year, in the summer in 50 m pool together with Swedish Championships and in early February in indoor 25m pool.

In the long course championships the Swedish Junior Champion is decided from the prelims of the Swedish Championships. The swimmers competing in the Junior's Championships may also swim the semi-finals and finals of the Swedish Championships if they qualify. Swimmers in the age of 20 years and younger may compete.

The short course championships has got the same event structure as the Swedish Short Course Swimming Championships and swimmers who are 20 years and younger may compete.

=== Swedish Youth Swimming Championships ===
The Swedish Youth Swimming Championships (Swedish: SUM-SIM Riks, Svenska Ungdomsmästerskapen i simning, Ungdoms-SM i simning) takes place two times a year, one in 50 m pool and one in 25m pool. The first time it was held was in Gävle after an initiative by NN from the Swedish tabloid Expressen. Ever since the Swedish Youth Championships has been the goal for all swimmers in the age group. At present time up to 16 years old, for the autumn championships and 17 for the summer championships.

For the short course championships, held in the end of November each year, there are eight trial meets around Sweden where the 14-16 best results (depending on number of lanes in the final) in each event qualifies for the national final. The age groups are 11–12 years, 13–14 years and 15–16 years individually and 13 years and younger respectively 16 years and younger in relays. All events are swam in timed finals.

For the long course championships, held in the summer each year, there are qualifying times for each event. The different age groups (since 2008 14 years and younger, 15 years/15 years and younger and 16–17 years) swim their prelims together in the morning session while the finals takes place in the evening age group per age group.

=== Swedish Open Water Swimming Championships ===
The Swedish Open Water Swimming Championships (Swedish: Svenska Mästerskapen i Open Water, Långlopps-SM/JSM) takes place in the Vansbrosimningen weekend. The distance is 5 km.

The Swedish Junior's Open Water Swimming Championships is swum in the same heat as the senior championship and open for swimmers 20 years and younger.

=== Swedish Swimming Grand Prix series ===
The Swedish Swimming Grand Prix series (Swedish: Svenskt Grand Prix) is a national swimming competition held each year in Sweden. The events take place in Long Course with morning finals as in the 2008 Summer Olympics. The meets are open for swimmers competing outside Sweden.

== International titles ==
Sweden has seven Olympic gold medalists; Sarah Sjöström (twice), Arne Borg, Bengt Baron, Håkan Malmrot (twice), Pär Arvidsson, Lars Frölander and Gunnar Larsson (twice). Sweden has taken a total of 28 men's and 7 women's medals.

Swedish swimmers have become world champions at the World Aquatics Championships five times; Sarah Sjöström, Gunnar Larsson, Lars Frölander, Therese Alshammar and the 1994 men's 4 × 200 m freestyle time consisting of Christer Wallin, Tommy Werner, Lars Frölander and Anders Holmertz. At the World Aquatics Championships, Sweden has taken 26 medals. At the World Short Course Swimming Championships, Sweden has taken 24 gold medals, 19 silver medals and 15 bronze medals.
