= Poul Hultberg =

Danish architect

Poul Erik Eggert Hultberg (27 March 1920, in Tryggelev, Denmark – 25 July 2016, in Gothenburg, Sweden) was a Danish architect, who worked primarily in Gothenburg, Sweden.

Hultberg studied at the Royal Danish Academy of Fine Arts in Copenhagen and graduated in 1943. He moved to Sweden in 1945.

He designed several sport facilities, the most famous being Scandinavium in 1971.

He has shaped several districts in Gothenburg such as Biskopsgården, Högsbo, Tynnered, and Kallebäck.
