= Helena Åberg =

Swedish swimmer

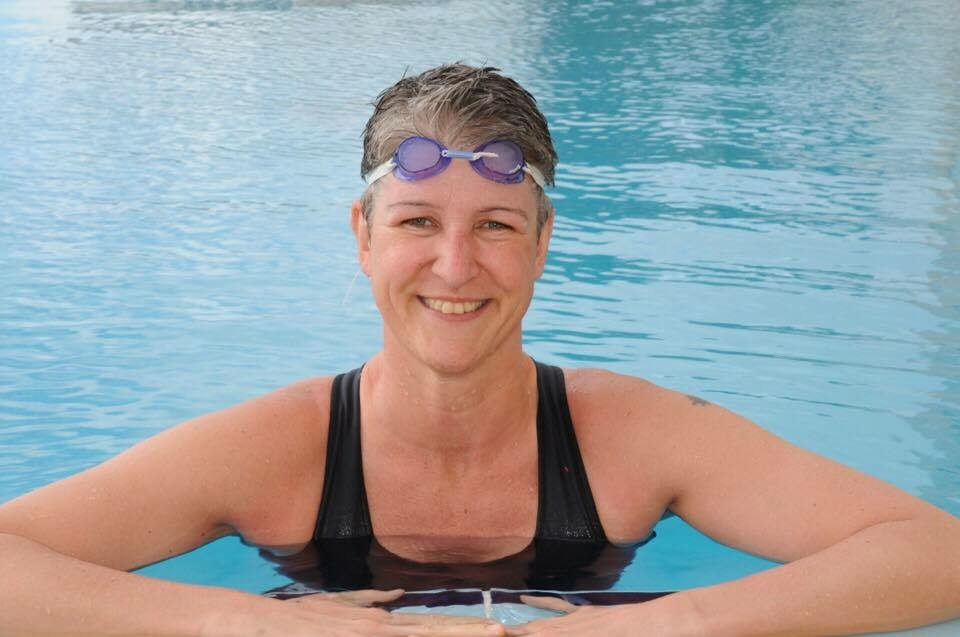
- Helena Aberg

Personal information
- Full name: Helena Åberg
- National team: Sweden
- Born: 16 July 1971 (age 54) Avesta, Dalarna, Sweden
- Height: 1.90 m (6 ft 3 in)
- Weight: 73 kg (161 lb)

Sport
- Sport: Swimming
- Strokes: freestyle
- Club: Helsingborgs SS
- College team: University of Georgia

Sara Helena Åberg (born 16 July 1971) is a former Swedish Olympic freestyle swimmer. She competed in the 1988 Summer Olympics, where she swam the 50-metre freestyle, finishing 23rd. Åberg also represented Sweden at the European Championships - winning a silver in relay - and the World Championships, winning a bronze medal in relay. At the Helsingborgs Simsällskaps 100 years jubilée in 2007, Åberg was awarded the swimmer of the century.

Åberg has lived openly gay since the end of 1980's. She had to go back into the closet for her time studying at the university in Georgia, where she felt "one was absolutely not allowed to be gay" at the time.

Åberg is the aunt of the Swedish Youth Olympics swimmer Gustav Åberg Lejdström.

== See also ==
- Helsingborgs SS
- List of University of Georgia people
