= Got Event =

Swedish sports venues management company

Got Event AB
- Company type: Aktiebolag
- Predecessor: Fritid Götebor
- Founded: April 1, 1999
- Headquarters: Gothenburg, Sweden
- Revenue: SEK 120 million (2007)
- Owner: Göteborgs Stad (Gothenburg Municipality)
- Number of employees: 129 (2007)
- Website: GotEvent.com

Got Event AB is a company owned by the City of Gothenburg (sv: Göteborgs Stad) that manages events at the city's sports venues. Got Event was formed when the company Fritid Göteborg was reorganized and split in 1999 to Got Event AB, Park- och naturförvaltningen, and Idrotts- och föreningsförvaltningen.

Got Event is responsible for events at Gamla Ullevi Stadium, Ullevi Stadium, Scandinavium indoor sports and event arena, Valhalla Swimming Hall, Lisebergshallen and Valhalla Sporthallar in Gothenburg. In 2007 Got Event held 340 events, that attracted 1.5 million visitors, and generated SEK 120 million in revenue
