= Simborgarmärket =

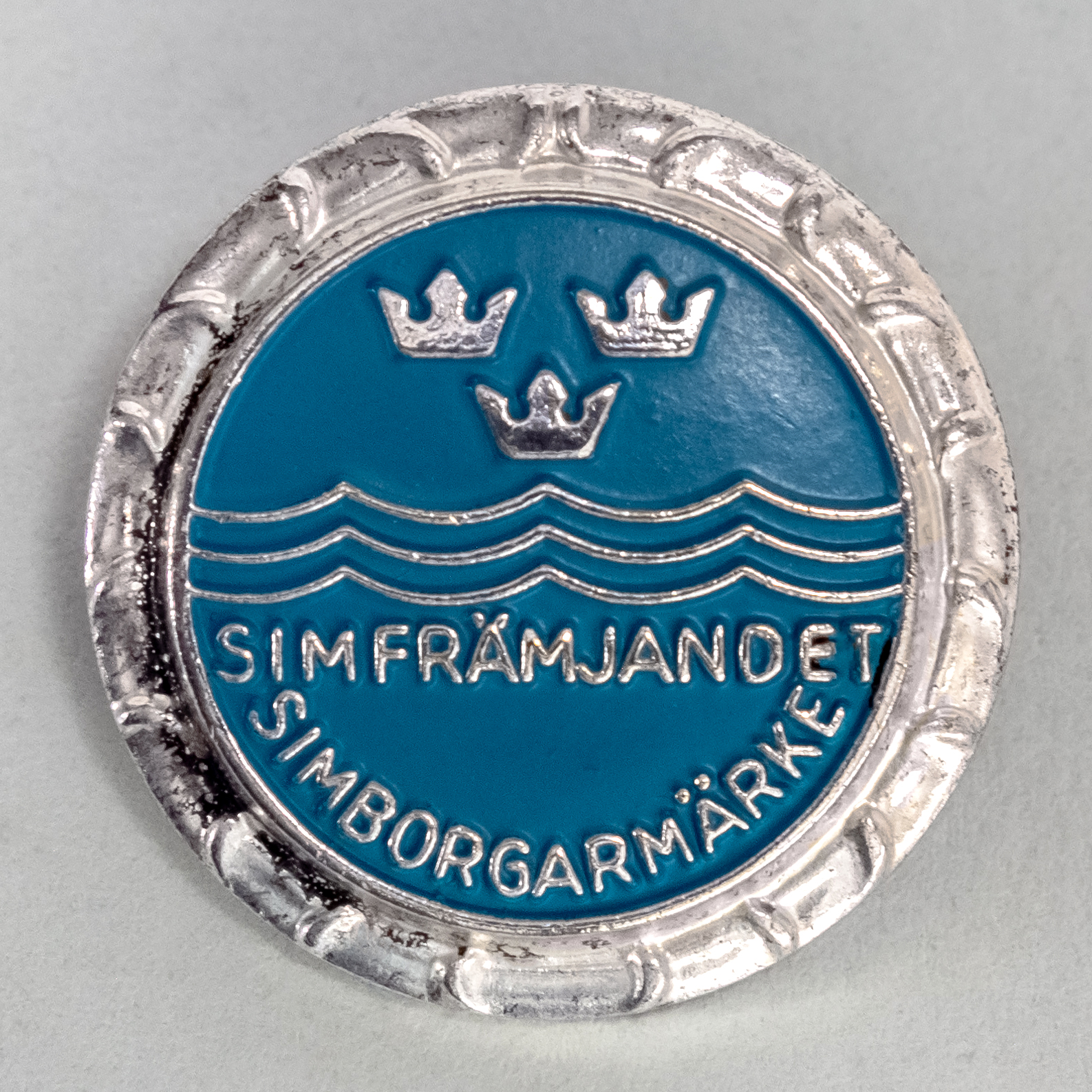
- Simborgarmärket
- Date: 8 July 1934
- Country: Sweden
- Presented by: Swedish Swimming Federation

Simborgarmärket is a badge awarded by the Swedish Swimming Federation to any person who can swim at least 200 metres using any stroke under no time requirement. The badge is updated every year with a new colour.

It was first awarded on 8 July 1934, on the initiative of David Jonason to promote swimming. Originally, it was only awarded to people aged 16 and older, and women only needed to swim 150 meters.
