= Gothenburg Horse Show =

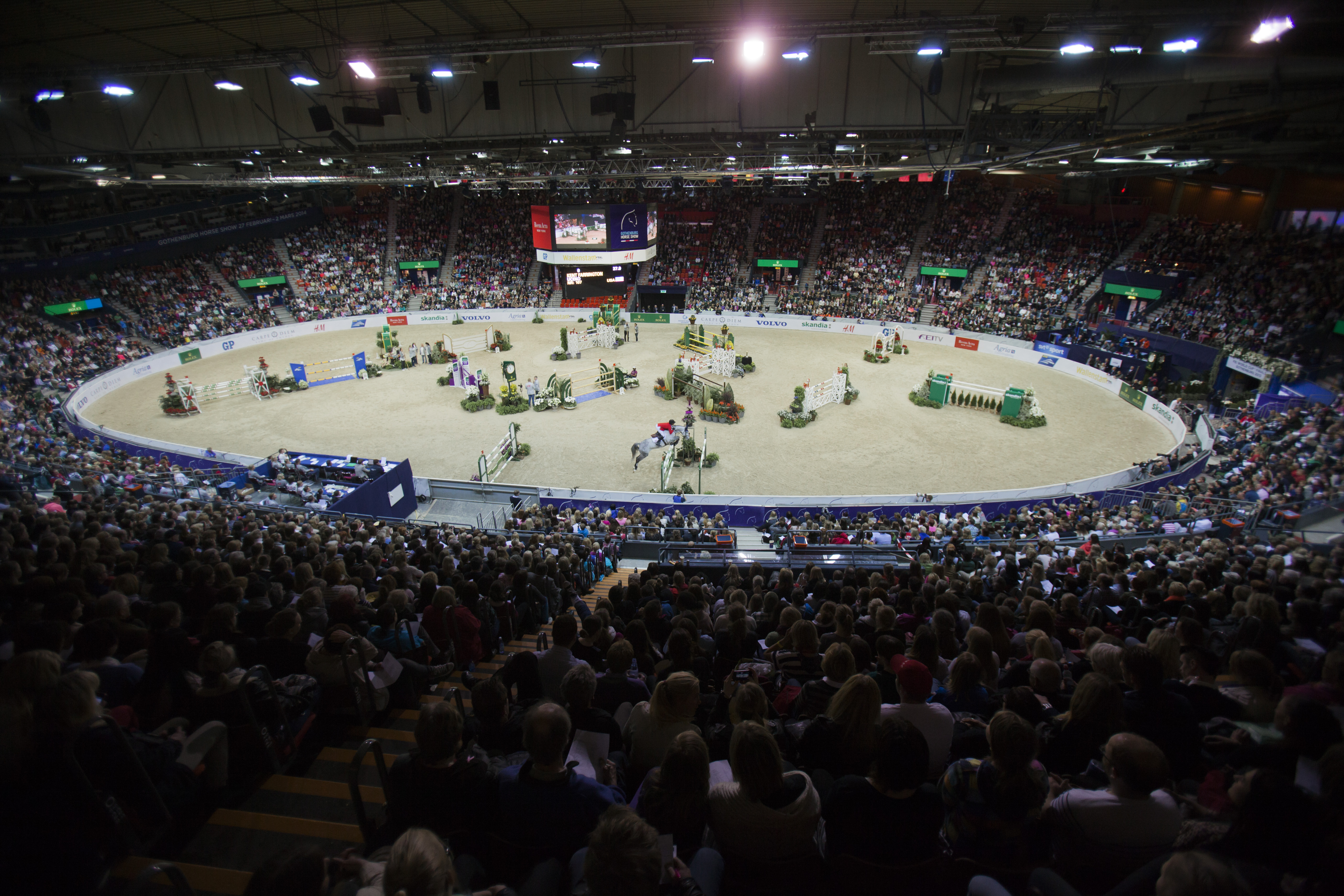
- Gothenburg Horse Show arena pictured 2014
- Status: active
- Genre: sporting event
- Date: spring
- Frequency: annual
- Location: Gothenburg
- Country: Sweden
- Inaugurated: 1977

Gothenburg Horse Show is an international horse show held annually in the Scandinavium arena in Gothenburg, Sweden. The event has been arranged since 1977 and is often held in the spring.
