= Helsingborgs S =

Swedish swimming club

Club information
- Full name: Helsingborgs Simsällskap
- Short name: HS
- City: Helsingborg
- Founded: 10 June 1907; 119 years ago
- Home pool: Filbornabadet

Helsingborgs Simsällskap, commonly known as Helsingborgs S or HS, is a Swedish swim team based in Helsingborg, Skåne County and founded in on 10 June 1907. The club's activities take place in Filbornabadet and Simhallsbadet. The most famous swimmers are Therese Alshammar, Helena Åberg, Johanna Sjöberg and Emma Igelström, who have all competed in the Summer Olympics.

Helsingborgs S was the largest sports club in Helsingborg in 2023, twice the size of football club Eskilsminne IF.

== Swimmers ==
Swimmers that have participated in the Summer Olympics while representing Helsingborgs S:

- Helena Åberg
- Louise Hansson
- Sophie Hansson
- Suzanne Nilsson
- Per-Ola Quist
- Johanna Sjöberg

== Coaches ==
- Hans Chrunak
