= Swedish Swimming Championships =

Swimming competition held in Sweden

- Sport: Swimming
- Founded: 1899
- No. of teams: 82 (2007)
- Country: Sweden
- Most recent champion(s): Last winners lists

The Swedish Swimming Championships (Swedish: Svenska Mästerskapen i simning, SM i simning, Sim-SM, Långbane-SM) are held annually in the Swedish summer in outdoor 50 m pool. The championships sometimes also works as trials for the Summer Olympics, World Championships and European Championships. Swimmers representing Swedish swim teams may participate.

== History ==
The first Swedish Swimming Championship was held in 1899 and in the beginning the championships were held in lakes or seas. During the 1920s and 1930s next to all championships were held in Eriksdalsbadet in Stockholm, but when it was demolished the championships started to move around Sweden.

Since 1988 the Senior's and Junior's Swedish Championships are hosted together with timed finals for the Junior's in the morning together with the prelims for the older swimmer.

The swimmer with the most individual gold medals is Anders Holmertz with 39 titles, before Therese Alshammar with 34, Arne Borg with 30, Lars Frölander with 27 titles and Robert Andersson with 24 titles. Of them, Therese Alshammar and Lars Frölander are the only swimmer still active.

== Champions ==
Name	Clubs	Titles	Years	Best event (titles)
Anders Holmertz	Motala SS, Spårvägens SF	39	1984–1996	400 m freestyle (13)
Therese Alshammar	Järfälla SS, SK Neptun	34	1993–2007	50 m freestyle, 50 m backstroke (both 9)
Arne Borg	Stockholms KK	30	1919–1929	500 m freestyle (9)
Lars Frölander	Borlänge SS, Sundsvalls SS, Linköpings ASS	27	1993–2007	100 m butterfly (10)
Robert Andersson	Stockholms KK	24	1906–1919	200 m freestyle, 500 m freestyle (both 5)
Björn Borg	Norrköpings KK	23	1936–1944	400 m freestyle (6)
Gunnar Larsson	Malmö SS	21	1967–1973	400 m freestyle, 200 m IM (both 5)
Michael Jacobsson	Täby Sim	21	1997–2003	400 m IM (7)
Per-Olof Östrand	Hofors AIF, IF Elfsborg	21	1947–1955	400 m freestyle (9)
Thor Henning	SK Neptun	21	1911–1921	200 m breaststroke, 400 m breaststroke (both 6)
Per-Olof Olsson	SoIK Hellas	20	1937–1949	100 m freestyle (11)
Martin Gustavsson	Malmö KK	19	2002–2006	100 m breaststroke, 200 m breaststroke (both 7)
John Rothman	Stockholms KK	19	1937–1949	200 m breaststroke (11)
Thomas Lejdström	Västerås SS	18	1979–1987	400 m freestyle, 400 m IM (both 4)
Jan Bidrman	Malmö KK	17	1986–1992	400 m IM (6)
Anita Zarnowiecki	Simavdelningen 1902	17	1969–1975	400 m IM (6)
Josefin Lillhage	Väsby SS	16	2001–2007	200 m freestyle (7)
Agneta Eriksson	Västerås SS	16	1979–1987	100 m butterfly (6)
Sara Nordenstam	Väsby SS	15	1998–2003	400 m IM (6)
Wilhelm Andersson	SK Neptun	15	1909–1918	500 m freestyle (5)

== Venues ==
- 1899 – Stockholm
- 1900 – Stockholm
- 1901 – Stockholm
- 1902 – Stockholm
- 1903 – Stockholm
- 1904 – Styrsö, Gothenburg
- 1905 – Malmö
- 1906 – Styrsö, Gothenburg
- 1907 – Styrsö, Gothenburg
- 1908 – Stockholm / Styrsö, Gothenburg
- 1909 – Stockholm / Örebro / Gothenburg
- 1910 – Stockholm
- 1911 – Stockholm / Eskilstuna / Gothenburg
- 1912 – Stockholm
- 1913 – Stockholm
- 1914 – Stockholm (m), Eskilstuna (f)
- 1915 – Stockholm (m), Gothenburg (f)
- 1916 – Saltsjöbaden
- 1917 – Saltsjöbaden
- 1918 – Stockholm
- 1919 – Malmö
- 1920 – Stockholm
- 1921 – Stockholm
- 1922 – Stockholm
- 1923 – Stockholm
- 1924 – Långedrag
- 1925 – Stockholm
- 1926 – Stockholm
- 1927 – Stockholm
- 1928 – Stockholm
- 1929 – Stockholm
- 1930 – Stockholm
- 1931 – Stockholm
- 1932 – Stockholm
- 1933 – Stockholm
- 1934 – Stockholm
- 1935 – Stockholm
- 1936 – Stockholm
- 1937 – Stockholm
- 1938 – Stockholm
- 1939 – Stockholm
- 1940 – Linköping
- 1941 – Lidköping
- 1942 – Ängelholm
- 1943 – Linköping
- 1944 – Malmö
- 1945 – Varberg
- 1946 – Kalmar
- 1947 – Varberg
- 1948 – Lidköping
- 1949 – Karlskrona
- 1950 – Stora Tuna
- 1951 – Varberg
- 1952 – Kalmar
- 1953 – Linköping
- 1954 – Linköping
- 1955 – Harnäs
- 1956 – Halmstad
- 1957 – Varberg
- 1958 – Eskilstuna
- 1959 – Fyrisbadet, Uppsala
- 1960 – Fyrisbadet, Uppsala
- 1961 – Varberg
- 1962 – Ronneby
- 1963 – Stockholm
- 1964 – Örebro
- 1965 – Valbo Sportcentrum, Valbo
- 1966 – Stockholm
- 1967 – Landskrona
- 1968 – Jönköping
- 1969 – Landskrona
- 1970 – Varberg
- 1971 – Jönköping
- 1972 – Borås
- 1973 – Norrköping
- 1974 – Jönköping
- 1975 – Norrköping
- 1976 – Skövde
- 1977 – Örebro
- 1978 – Landskrona
- 1979 – Ronneby
- 1980 – Ronneby
- 1981 – Gävle
- 1982 – Stockholm
- 1983 – Falun
- 1984 – Västerås
- 1985 – Rosenlundsbadet, Jönköping
- 1986 – Åby simhall, Mölndal
- 1987 – Valhallabadet, Gothenburg
- 1988 – Rosenlundsbadet, Jönköping
- 1989 – Citadellbadet, Landskrona
- 1990 – Himmelstalundsbadet, Norrköping
- 1991 – Fyrishov, Uppsala
- 1992 – Alidebergsbadet, Borås
- 1993 – Citadellbadet, Landskrona
- 1994 – Himmelstalundsbadet, Norrköping
- 1995 – Citadellbadet, Landskrona
- 1996 – Fyrishov, Uppsala
- 1997 – Himmelstalundsbadet, Norrköping
- 1998 – Sporthallsbadet, Sundsvall
- 1999 – Halmstads Simstadion, Halmstad
- 2000 – Citadellbadet, Landskrona
- 2001 – Sporthallsbadet, Sundsvall
- 2002 – Citadellbadet, Landskrona
- 2003 – Himmelstalundsbadet, Norrköping
- 2004 – Eriksdalsbadet, Stockholm
- 2005 – Sporthallsbadet, Sundsvall
- 2006 – Citadellbadet, Landskrona
- 2007 – Halmstads Simstadion, Halmstad
- 2008 – Himmelstalundsbadet, Norrköping
- 2009 – Linköping
- 2010 – Malmö
- 2011 – Halmstad
- 2012 – Norrköping
- 2013 – Simstadion Brottet, Halmstad

== See also ==
- List of Swedish Swimming Championships champions
- Swedish Swimming Grand Prix series
- Swedish Short Course Swimming Championships
- List of sporting events in Sweden
