= Hans Chrunak =

Swedish swimming coach (1948–2026)

Personal information
- National team: Sweden
- Born: 19 September 1948
- Died: 6 June 2026 (aged 77)
- Occupations: Coach; commentator

Sport
- Sport: Swimming
- Club: Helsingborgs SS

Hans Chrunak (19 September 1948 – 6 June 2026) was a Swedish swimming coach. He was the head coach of the Swedish national swim team between 1991 and 2000. From 2005 to 2007 he was the general manager of the Swedish ice hockey club Luleå HF. Chrunak was also a swimming coach for Helsingborgs SS and a swimming commentator on Sveriges Television.

In 2014, Chrunak received an honorary stone on the Landskrona Walk of Fame. He died on 6 June 2026, at the age of 77, after battling cancer.

== Sources ==
- "Hans Chrunak". www.talarforum.se (in Swedish). Talarforum i Skandinavien AB.
- Malin Fransson (23 September 2005). "Frispråkige Chrunak basar i Luleå". Dagens Nyheter (in Swedish).
- Per Vallgårda/TT; Jakob Sillén/TT (4 December 2007). "Chrunak avgår i Luleå". Dagens Nyheter (in Swedish).
- "Chrunak blir hockeydirektör i Luleå". Svenska Dagbladet (in Swedish). 9 August 2005.
