= Nils Olsson =

Swedish architect

Olympic medal record

Art competitions
Bronze medal – third place	1948 London	Architectural design

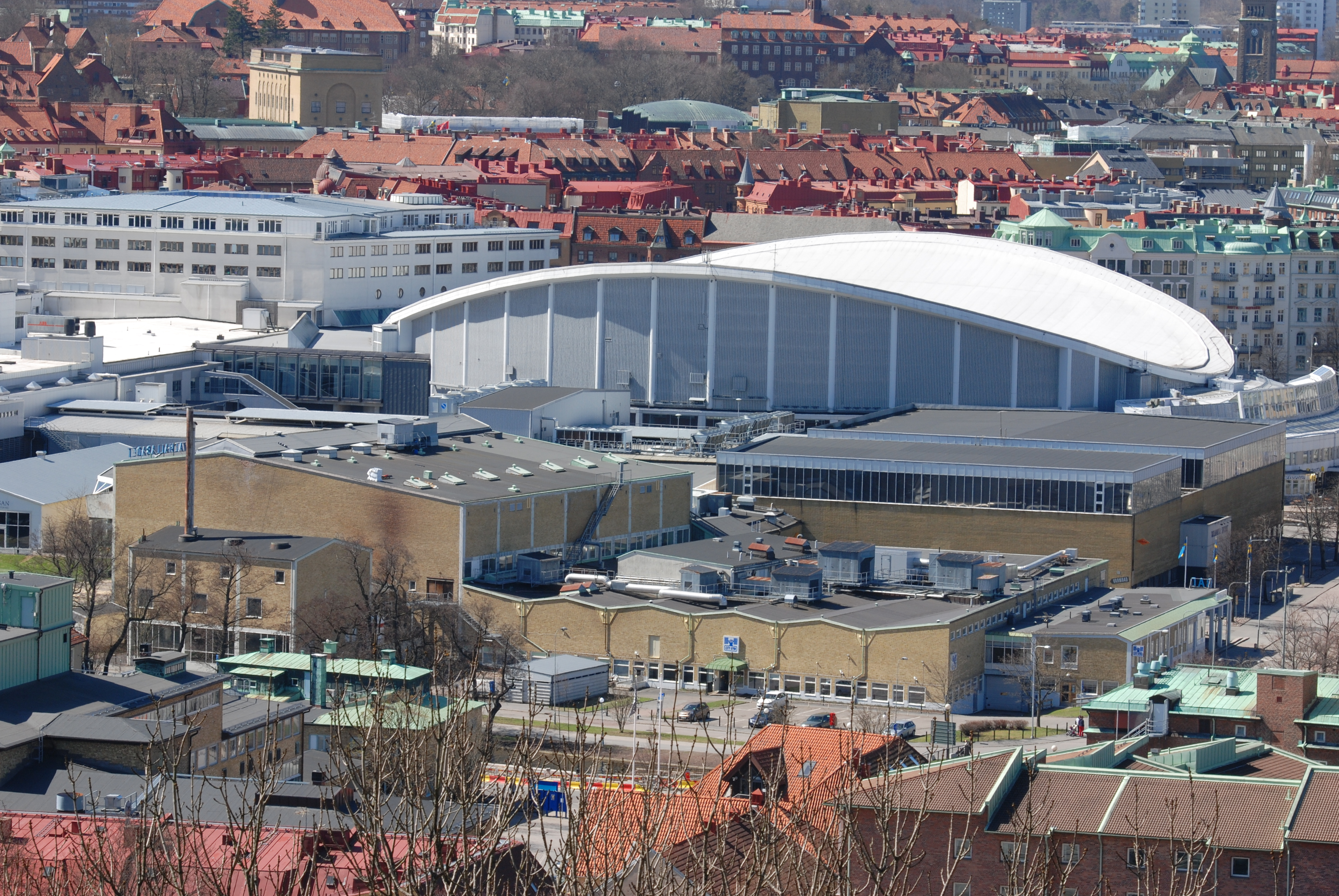
Valhalla Swimming Hall

Nils Olsson (March 10, 1891 – September 21, 1951) was a Swedish architect.

== Biography ==
Nils Olsson was born at Halmstad in Halland, Sweden. He studied at the Technical Elementary School in Malmö and then at Technical University of Munich 1908–1913. He worked in Gothenburg from the 1920s until his death in 1951. He won a bronze medal in the art competitions of the 1948 Summer Olympics for designing the Valhalla Swimming Hall (Valhallabadet) at Gothenburg.
