= Scandinavium =

Indoor ice hockey venue in Gothenburg, Sweden

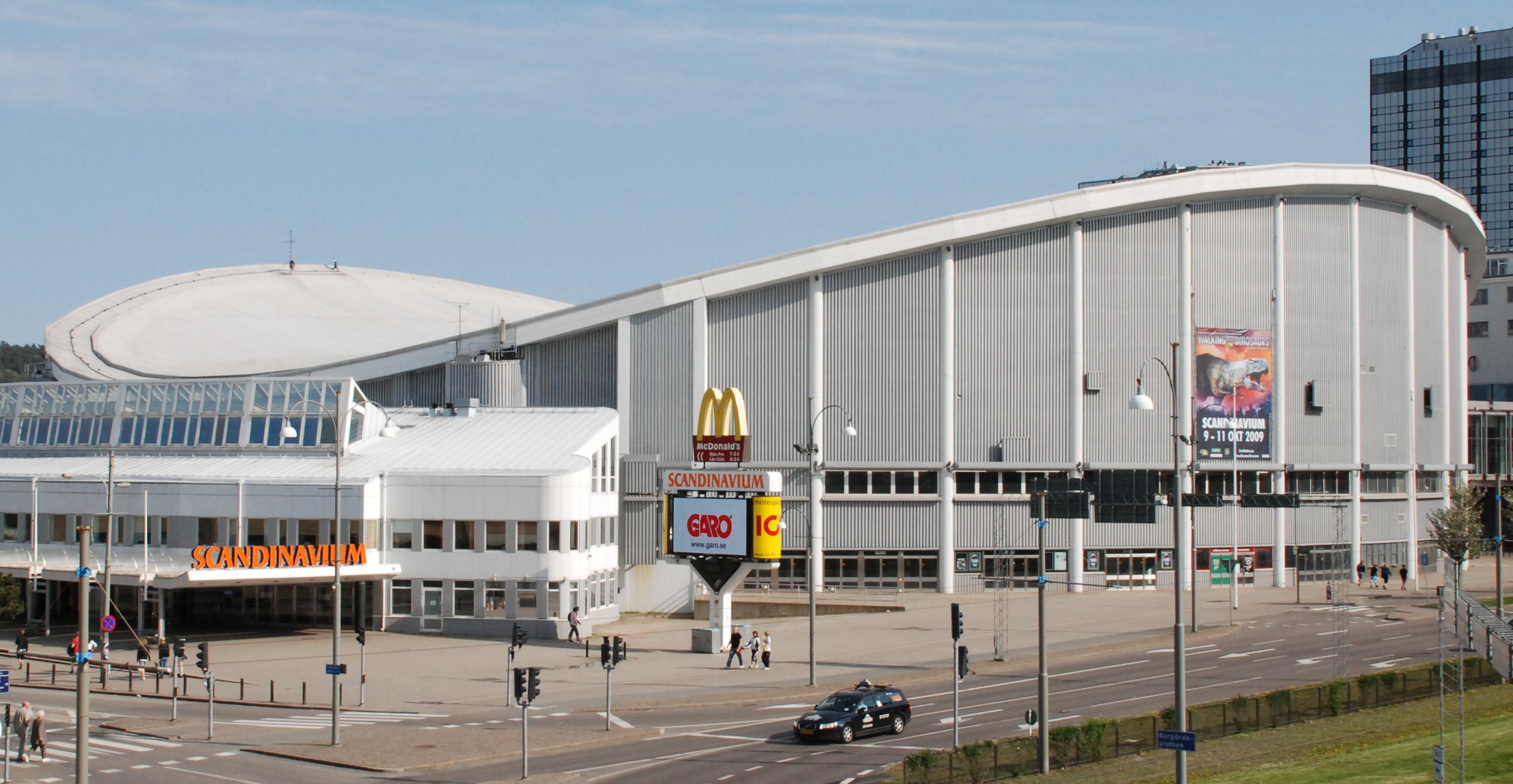
- Scandinavium in May 2009
- Interactive map of Scandinavium
- Location: Valhallagatan 1 Gothenburg, Sweden
- Coordinates: 57°41′57″N 11°59′16″E
- Owner: Idrotts- och kulturcentrum Scandinavium i Göteborg AB
- Operator: Got Event
- Capacity: Handball: 12,312; Ice hockey: 12,044; Concerts: 14,000
- Record attendance: 14,606 (Whitney Houston; 29 May 1988)

Construction
- Built: May 1969 — May 1971
- Opened: 18 May 1971
- Renovated: 2001, 2006
- Expanded: 1990
- Cost: 31 million SEK
- Architect: Poul Hultberg

Tenants
- Frölunda HC (SHL) (1971–present); Redbergslids IK (Handbollsligan) (2019–2020)

Scandinavium (Swedish pronunciation: [skandɪˈnɑ̌ːvɪɵm]) is an indoor arena located in Gothenburg, Sweden. Construction on Scandinavium began in 1969 after decades of setbacks, and was inaugurated on 18 May 1971.

Scandinavium has been selected as a championship arena at least fifty times, hosting events such as World Championships in handball and ice hockey, European championships, Davis Cup finals, and in 1985 the Eurovision Song Contest. Scandinavium is the home arena for Frölunda HC of Swedish Hockey League and venue for the annual Göteborg Horse Show. Frölunda has won the Le Mat Trophy, awarded to the winner of the SHL, four times since it began playing at the venue, most recently in 2019.

== History ==
Plans to build an arena at the site were part of a proposal originating from 1931 to build a swimming hall and other municipally owned facilities for sport and recreation next to the exhibition center Svenska Mässan. In 1936 a preplanning process for the swimming hall and the adjunct area started, but was put on hold due to the precarious situation in Europe at the time and eventually canceled following the outbreak of World War II. In 1948 an architectural design competition was announced for an indoor arena with the project name Valhalla Inomhusarena (English: Valhalla indoor arena), the winning design was presented by a work group led by architect Poul Hultberg, who was working for Nils Olsson's architect firm in Gothenburg. Financing for the arena and other proposed facilities became a subject of public and political debate, the plans to build the arena were postponed indefinitely. The Valhalla Swimming Hall, which was the primary building in the 1931 proposal, was the only proposed facility to be built during the 1950s due to capacity problems at other central swimming facilities.

In the 1962 election campaign the Swedish Social Democratic Party guaranteed that they would build the arena if they won the election. The Social Democrats won the election and a pre-planning process was started but financing was still an issue and the plans were yet again put on hold. In 1968 a committee assigned to plan the 350th year celebration of Gothenburg considered that it was a good idea to build the arena in time for the celebrations in 1971, making it a lasting memory of the anniversary. A company responsible for the construction was formed by the municipality and private investors, while Hultberg was asked to revise his 23-year-old designs. An estimated construction cost of twenty-three million SEK caused wild protests and intense debates but did not delay the progress. In May 1969 it was discovered that there was no construction permit for the arena, delaying the start of construction for a few weeks. When tartan tracks were installed near the end of construction, the concentration of flammable gases in the building was so high that one spark could have potentially blown up the entire structure. When construction was completed in May 1971, Scandinavium stood as the largest covered arena in northern Europe with an attendance capacity of 14,000 spectators. The construction cost totaled 31 million SEK, which resulted in an eight million SEK budget deficit.

In May 2023, the Gothenburg city council approved the construction of a new sports facility on the site of the Valhalla Swimming Hall, which will be followed by the demolition of the current arena.

== Structure and facilities ==
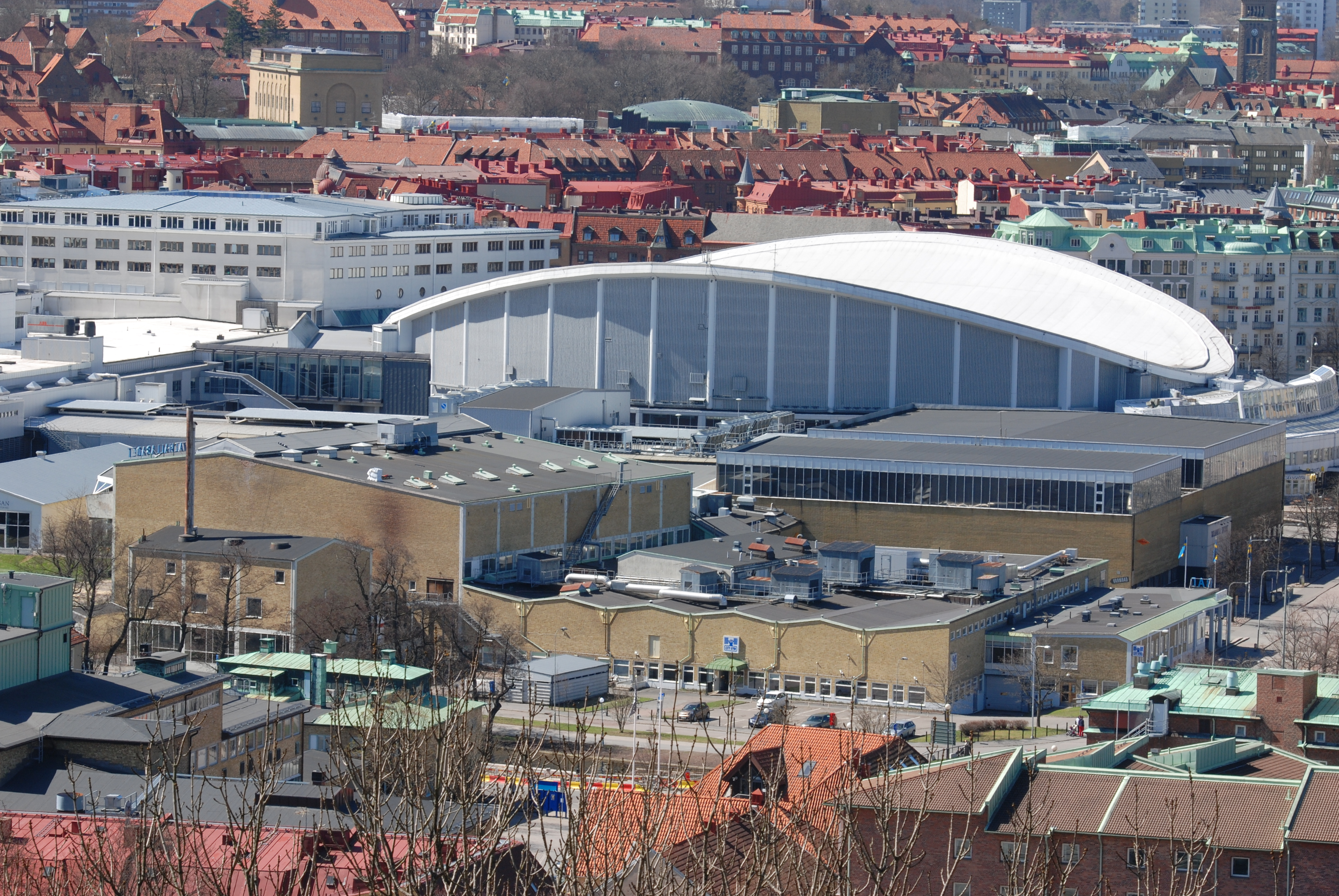
Scandinavium with Valhalla Swimming Hall in the foreground

Scandinavium's "sweeping appearance" comes from the hyperbolic paraboloid shaped saddle roof, which resembles other arenas such as the Saddledome in Calgary. The roof is supported by a prestressed cable net, with a nearly constant spacing of four meters in both directions, anchored in a space curved reinforced concrete ring beam with a rectangular cross-section of 3.5 by 1.2 meters (11.5 ft × 3.9 ft). The hanging cables rise ten meters to the top from the saddle point and the bracing cables fall four meters to the valley of the ring beam. The building is 14 meters (46 ft) tall, from the event floor to the pinnacle of the roof. The ring beam is supported by forty circular columns and four stiff pylons, all visible in the arenas facade. The pylons consist of radially oriented concrete walls, with a length of 3.5 meters (11 ft), which stores ventilation equipment. The video board, lights, and sound system is suspended in a radially oriented cable system anchored in the four pylons. It was not consider stable enough for colour telecasting to attach these components directly to the roof. The cable system also serves as tension rods for the ring beam.

The seating in Scandinavium is arranged in a one-level monolithic grandstand. The round design of the structure and the symmetric oval shape of the 4,100 m^{2} (44,000 sq ft) arena floor results in more rows along the length of the floor. The first six rows are telescopic seating which can be electrically retracted. There are forty-four executive boxes in the arena, located between the two northern pylons.

The ice hockey rink measures 61 by 30 meters (200 ft × 98 ft) which is standard international size. New double frame half boards were installed in 2001, designed to switch to NHL rink dimensions or to be easily removed when other events than ice hockey take place. To maximize the view for spectators, a seamless protective glass barrier consisting of tempered glass panels clipped together at their top corners with clear plastic brackets is used instead of traditional Plexiglas with metal dividers.

For the 2011 Göteborg Horse Show a new equestrian surface was purchased for two million SEK.

The arena also contains a McDonald's restaurant, and the familiar golden arches are placed atop the arena's street sign.

== Location and transportation ==
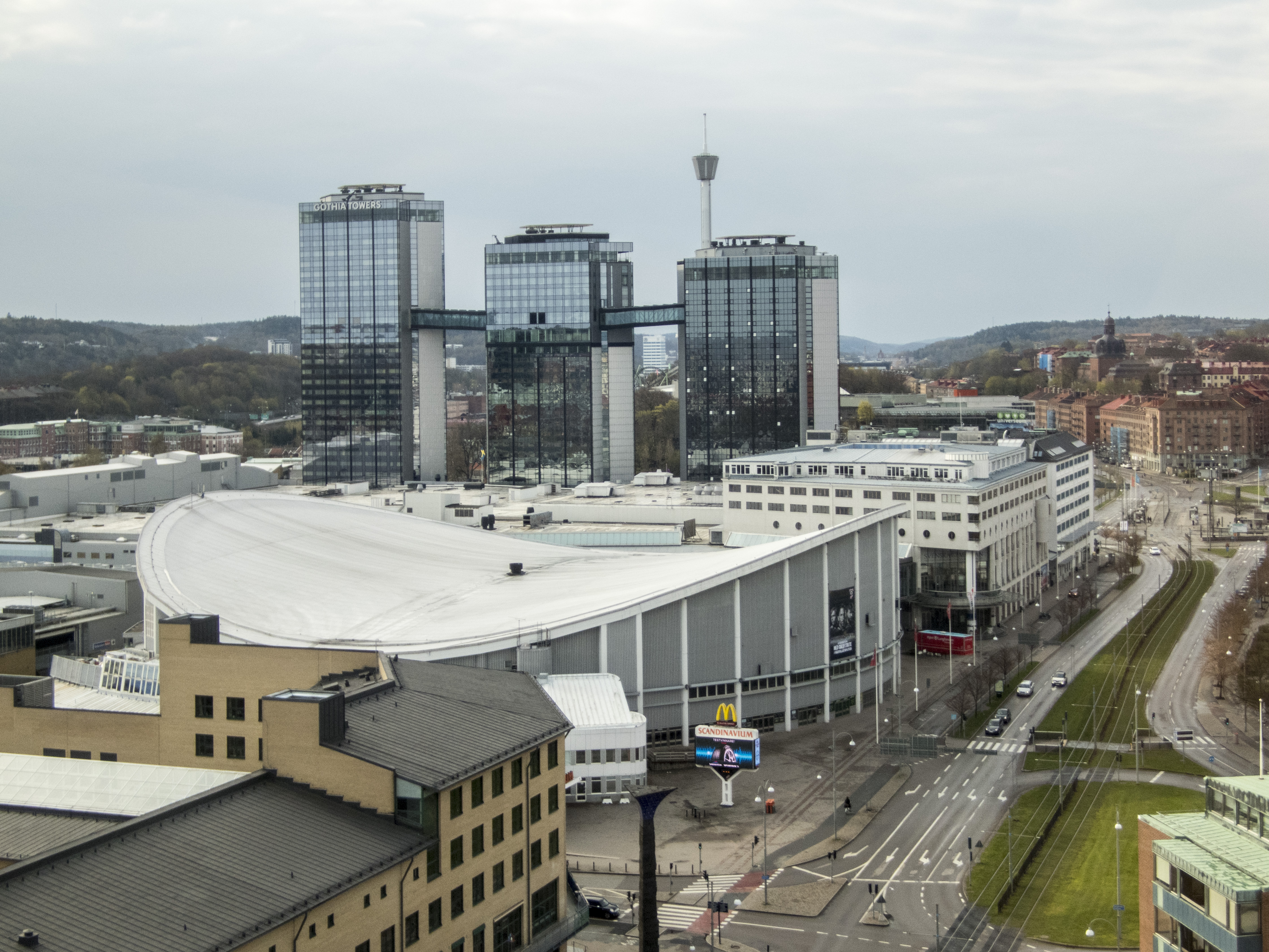
Scandinavium with the Swedish Exhibition and Congress Centre and Gothia Towers in the background

Scandinavium is located in central Gothenburg, in the Heden district of the borough Centrum. Scandinavium is one of the center pieces of the event district called Evenemangsstråket, with Ullevi Stadium, Liseberg, Universeum, the Museum of World Culture, and Bergakungen nearby. Public transport is easily accessible; Just outside there is a tram stop named after the arena, which serves tram lines two, six, eight, thirteen, and fourteen. Tram lines four and five stops 250 meters from the arena at Korsvägen, a major public transport hub, which serves more than fifteen different bus lines, and will have an underground rapid transit station once Västlänken is completed. Approximately one and one half kilometer north west from Scandinavium is the Gothenburg Central Station and the Nils Ericson Terminal, one half kilometer south east is the Liseberg station serving the Gothenburg commuter rail.

When Frölunda and the Ottawa Senators played an exhibition game on 2 October 2008, spectators could use their game tickets for free travel with public transportation within Gothenburg's municipality, before and after the game. Extra trams and buses were in traffic during this time. The campaign was a test to see if it would be possible to include a public transportation fee on tickets to future events.

Due to Scandinavium's central location the arena site itself does not have any public parking spaces, parking is only provided for sponsors, the press, and event personnel at a guard-gated parking lot next to Valhalla IP. Visitors are guided to eighteen nearby parking lots and parking garages—with a total of 7,000 parking spaces—by the event districts parking guidance and information system. The system has a total of 130 digital signs, located on motorways with information about which exit to use, and on streets in the city with more detailed information about directions and number of available parking spaces.

== Notable events ==
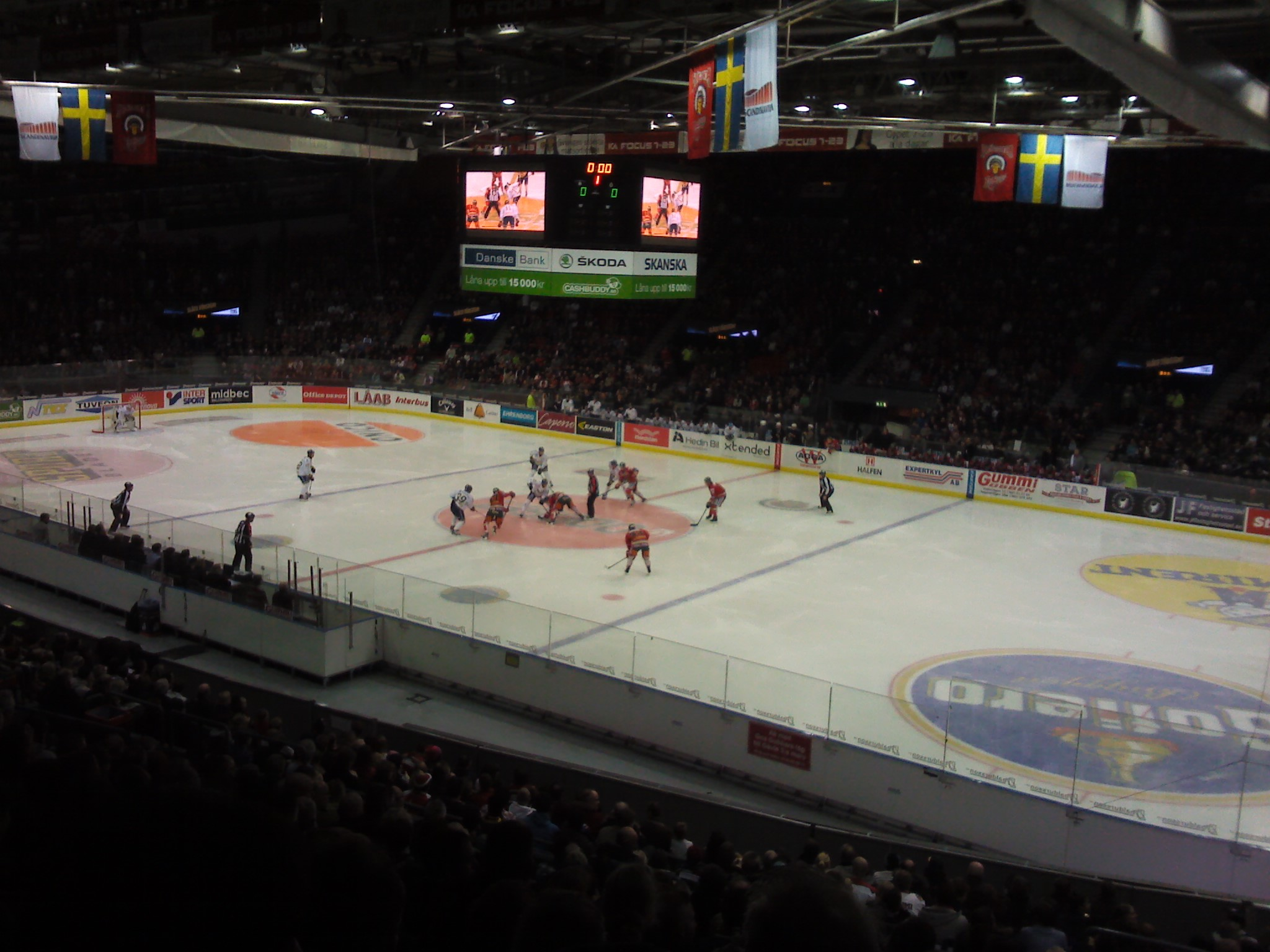
The arena during an ice hockey match. During a concert, the ice hockey rink is temporarily removed.

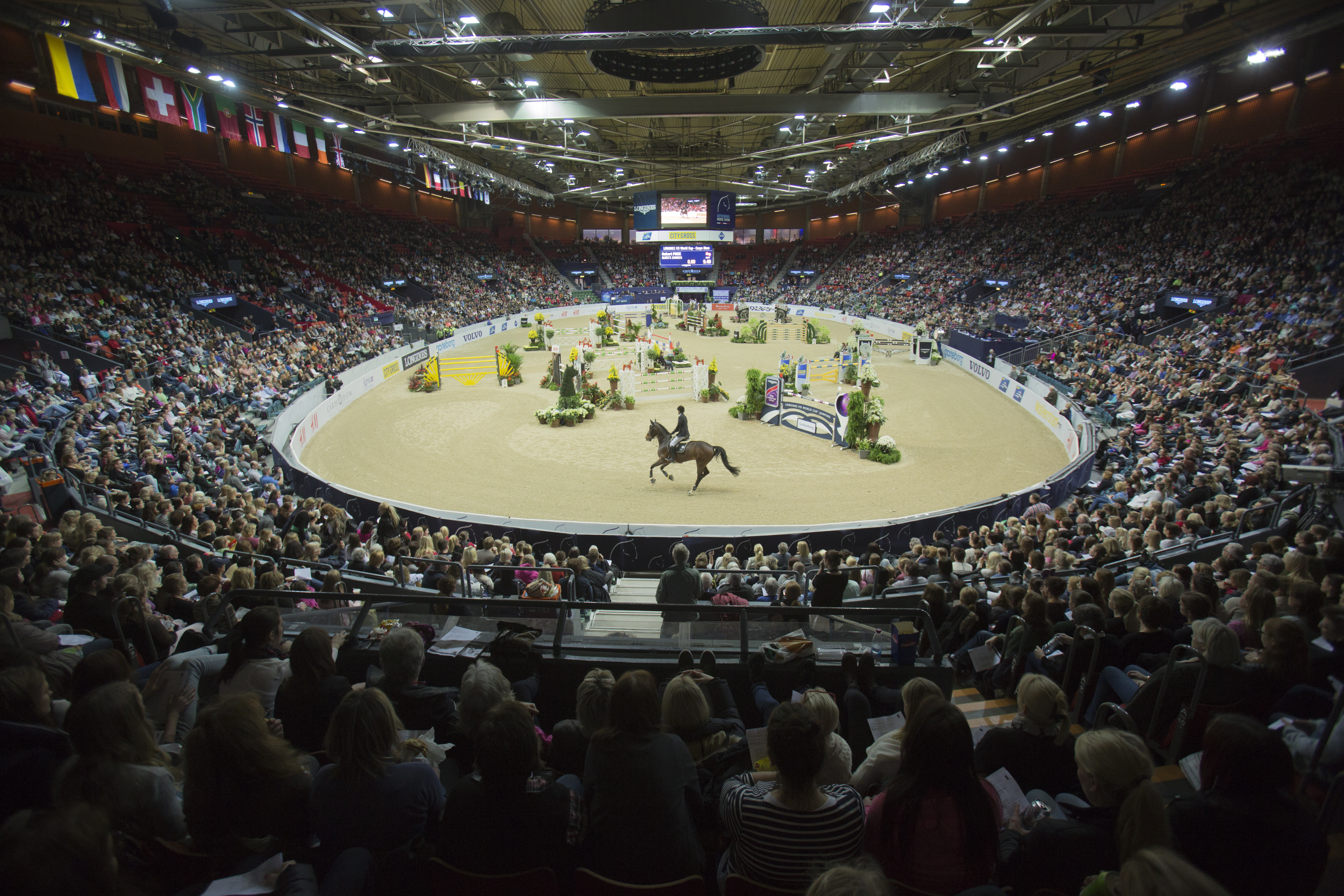
The arena during the Göteborg Horse Show.

Event	Year(s)
European Figure Skating Championships	1972, 1980, 1985
European Athletics Indoor Championships	1974, 1984, 2013
World Figure Skating Championships	1976, 2008
IIHF Men's World Ice Hockey Championships	1981, 2002
IIHF World Junior Championship	2024
Men's World Floorball Championships	2014
ITF Davis Cup Final	1984, 1987, 1988, 1997
Eurovision Song Contest	1985
FINA Swimming World Cup	1988, 1989
FINA Short Course World Championships	1997
ISU World Synchronized Skating Championships	2005, 2012
European Women's Handball Championship	2006, 2016
European Men's Handball Championship	2002
World Men's Handball Championships	1993, 2011, 2023

The arena has also hosted a heat of Melodifestivalen every year since the introduction of the current format, except 2002, 2021 and 2022 (the latter two due to the COVID-19 pandemic). It was also considered to host the final of Melodifestivalen 2010, but scheduling conflicts ruled this out. The arena has hosted the annual Göteborg Horse Show since 1977.

The arena has hosted concerts by many famous artists, spanning many different genres. Some of the first major concerts to take place at the venue were performed by The Who, Deep Purple and Led Zeppelin during their 1972 and 1973 European Tours respectively. In May 1988, pop/R&B superstar, Whitney Houston, would set the record attendance with 14,606 tickets sold on her Moment of Truth World Tour. Iron Maiden have performed at the arena the most with a total of nine times, the latest being in 2006.

The arena was one of the potential candidate venues to host the Eurovision Song Contest in 2013 and again in 2024. In the end, the Malmö Arena was chosen to host the contest on both occasions. However, the venue eventually hosted the second heat of Melodifestivalen 2024.

== See also ==
- List of indoor arenas in Sweden
- List of indoor arenas in Nordic countries
- List of European ice hockey arenas

Events and tenants
Preceded by Ahoy, Rotterdam; Budapest Sportcsárnok, Budapest; Palais Omnisports de Paris-Bercy, Paris	European Indoor Championships in Athletics; Venue; 1974; 1984; 2013	Succeeded by Spodek, Katowice; Peace and Friendship Stadium, Athens; O2 Arena, Prague
Preceded by Kooyong Stadium, Melbourne; Kooyong Stadium, Melbourne; Mässan Hall, Malmö	Davis Cup; Final venue 1984; 1987, 1988; 1997	Succeeded by Olympiahalle, Munich; Schleyerhalle, Stuttgart; Fila Forum, Milan
Preceded by Grand Theatre; Luxembourg City	Eurovision Song Contest; Venue; 1985	Succeeded by Grieghallen; Bergen
Preceded by Metropolitan Gymnasium, Tokyo	World Figure Skating Championships; Venue; 2008	Succeeded by Staples Center, Los Angeles
Preceded by Hallenstadion, Zürich	Floorball World Championships; Final Venue; 2014	Succeeded by TBD
Preceded by László Papp Budapest Sports Arena, Budapest	European Women's Handball Championship; Final Venue; 2016	Succeeded by Palais Omnisports de Paris-Bercy, Paris
