= Simhallsbadet, Malmö =

Swimming complex in Malmö, Sweden

Coordinates: 55°35′58″N 12°59′34″E

Simhallsbadet
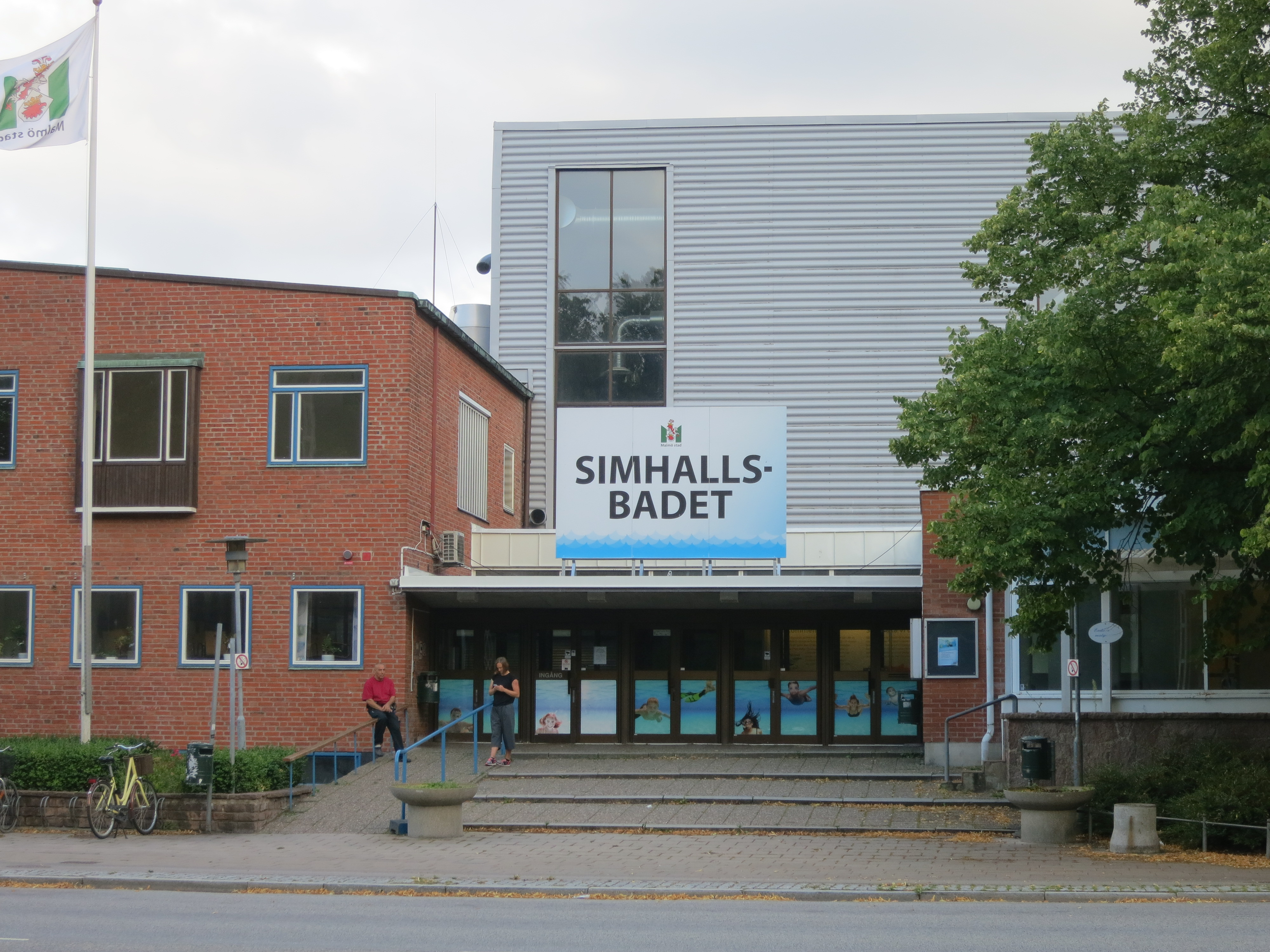
- Simhallsbadet in 2016
- Interactive map of Simhallsbadet
- Full name: Simhallsbadet
- Address: Malmö, Sweden

Construction
- Opened: 17 March 1956

Tenants
- Malmö KK; SK Ran

Simhallsbadet is a swimming complex in Malmö city, Sweden owned by the Malmö Municipality. It was known as Aq-va-kul 1988–2015. Today it is mainly used by swimming clubs and schools.

== History ==
=== Simhallsbadet (1956–1988) ===
Simhallsbadet was built as a public swimming venue in 1956 with a 25 m pool, and in 1977 a 50 m pool was added.

=== Aq-va-kul (1988–2015) ===
In 1988 a water park was built and the facility's name changed to Aq-va-kul. There were also Victorian-style Turkish baths and a relaxation area. The facility had 600,000 visitors yearly. The name Aq-va-kul is a word play on the Latin word for water, aqua, and the Swedish phrase Ack, vad kul (English: "Oh!, how fun").

Aq-va-kul was the arena for seven Swedish Short Course Swimming Championships (until 2003), four Swedish Junior's Swimming Championships (until 2002), four Swedish Youth Short Course Swimming Championships finals (until 2006), and several meets in the FINA Swimming World Cup series in the 1990s. The current European record for men's 800 m freestyle was set in the 25 m pool in January 1997 by German Jörg Hoffman, with a time of 7:36.24.

=== Simhallsbadet (2015 –) ===
In 2015 Hylliebadet replaced Aq-va-kul as a public swimming venue. The water park section closed on May 31 2015. At the same time Aq-va-kul changed name to the former Simhallsbadet and is now mainly used by swimming clubs and schools.

Due to the building reaching the end of its service life, Simhallsbadet is planned to be closed in 2029, to be replaced by a new swimming complex.
