= Valhalla Swimming Hall =

Swimming venue in Gothenburg, Sweden

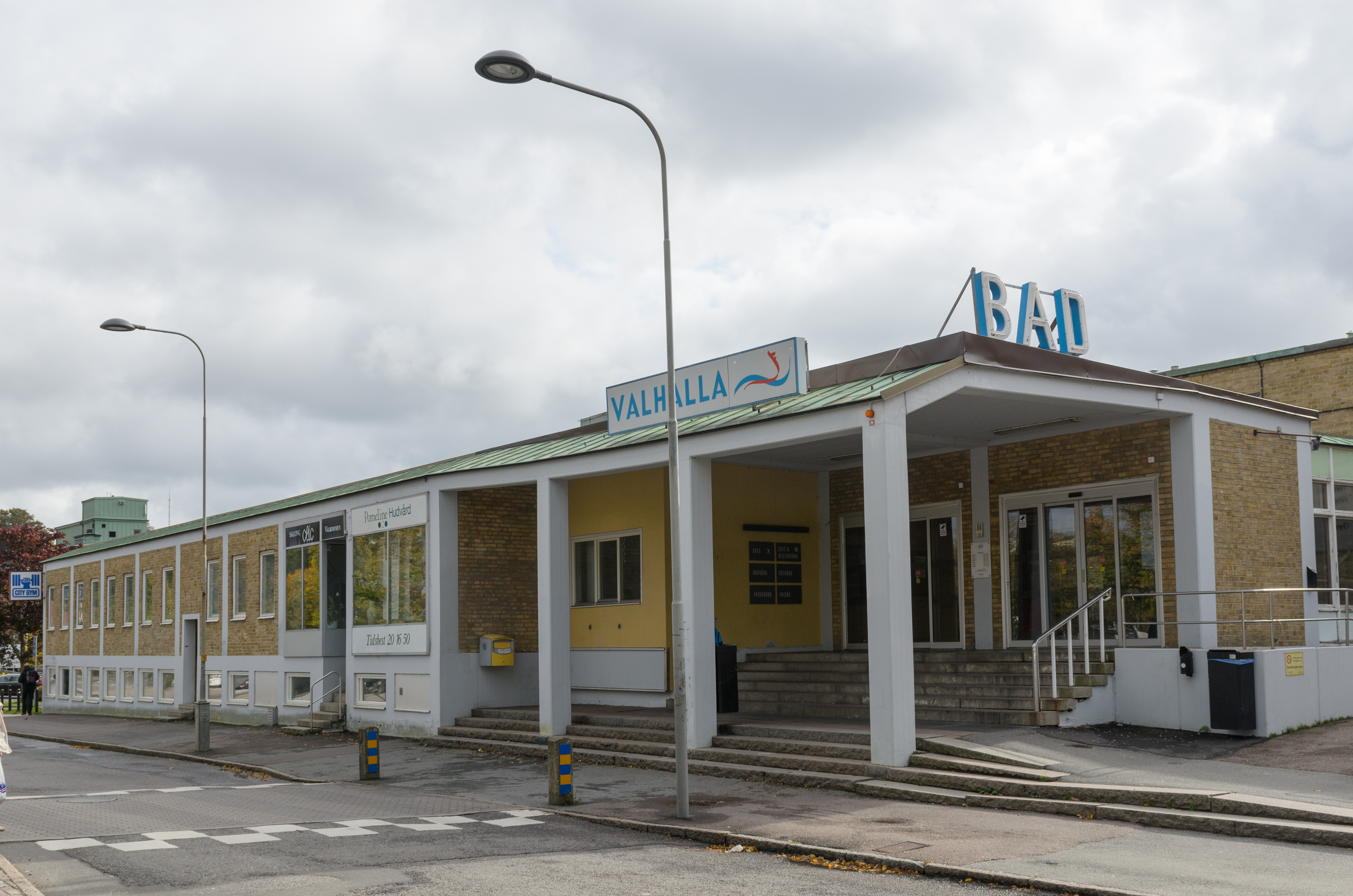
- Interactive map of Valhalla Swimming Hall
- Full name: Valhallabadet
- Address: Gothenburg, Sweden
- Coordinates: 57°41′58″N 11°59′24″E

Construction
- Opened: December 6, 1956
- Architect: Nils Olsson

Tenants
- Göteborg Sim; SK S02; Simidrottsklubben

Valhalla Swimming Hall (Swedish: Valhallabadet) is a swimming hall located in Gothenburg, Sweden. Valhalla was officially opened on December 6, 1956, by Gothenburg's municipal commissioner Torsten Henriksson.

== History ==
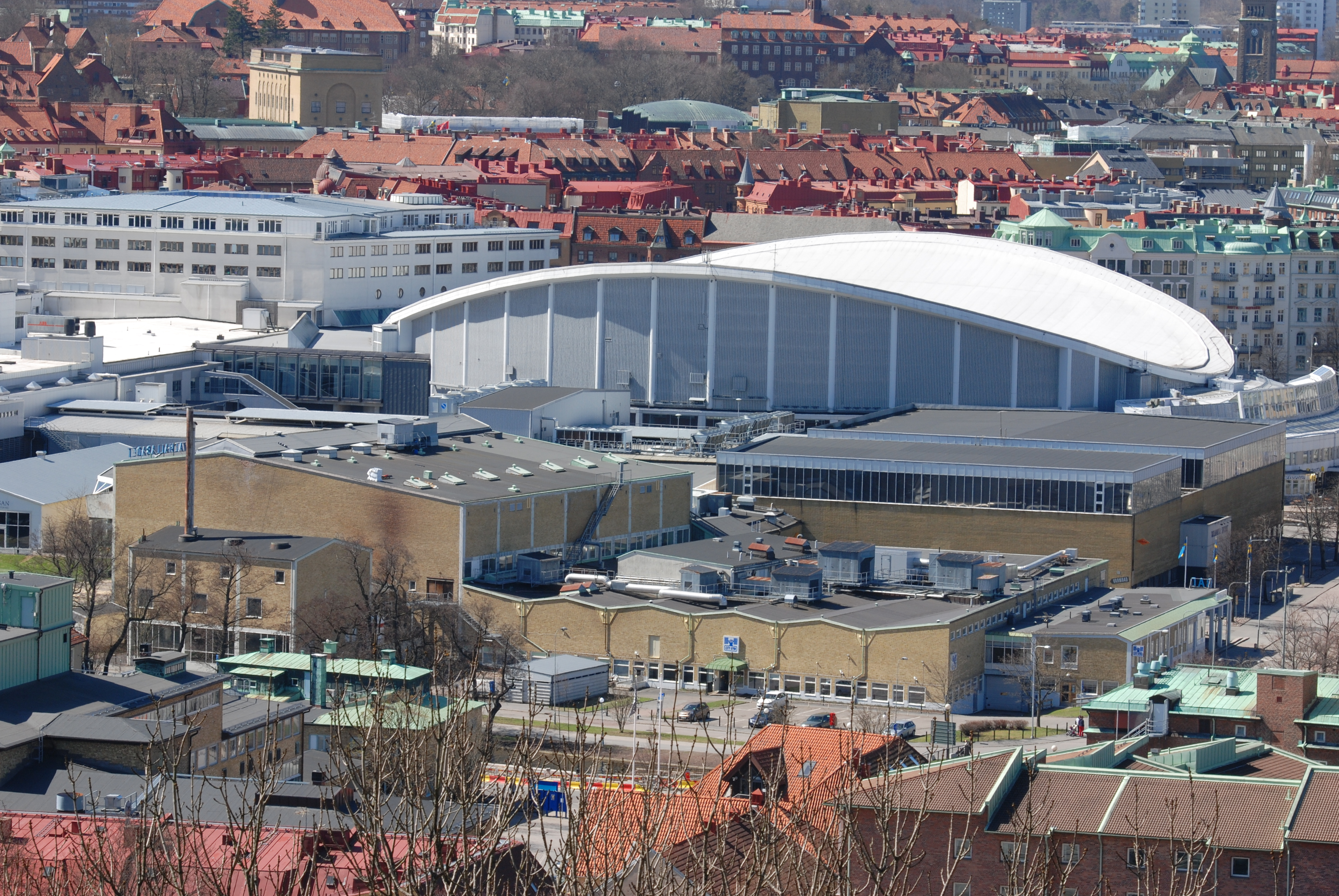
Valhalla Swimming Hall in the foreground with Scandinavium in the background.

Valhalla was designed by Nils Olsson, the design was awarded with a bronze Olympic medal at the 1948 Summer Olympics. The work was completed by Gustav Samuelsson in 1956 after Olsson's death.

Upon completion at 67,000 m^{3}, Valhalla was the biggest and most modern swimming facility in Sweden. The interior decoration of 700 square meters (7,535 square feet) was made by local painter Nils Wendel.

In 1959 the men's tub bathing area was rebuilt to a thermae bath. In 1967 a 50-meter outdoor swimming pool was added to the facility. In 1987 the outdoor pool was replaced by a 50-meter indoor pool.

In May 2023, the Gothenburg city council approved the demolition of the Valhalla Swimming Hall in order to make room for the reconstruction of Scandinavium.

== Events ==
Valhallabadet was a venue for the 1997 Short Course World Championships, the main venue was Scandinavium.

During the 2005 Swedish Short Course Championships Anna-Karin Kammerling broke the world record on 50 meter butterfly with the time 25.33 seconds.

Valhallabadet was the swimming venue for the XIII FINA World Masters Championships in the summer of 2010.
