= Eriksdalsbadet =

Sports venue in Stockholm, Sweden

Coordinates: 59°18′16″N 18°4′33″E

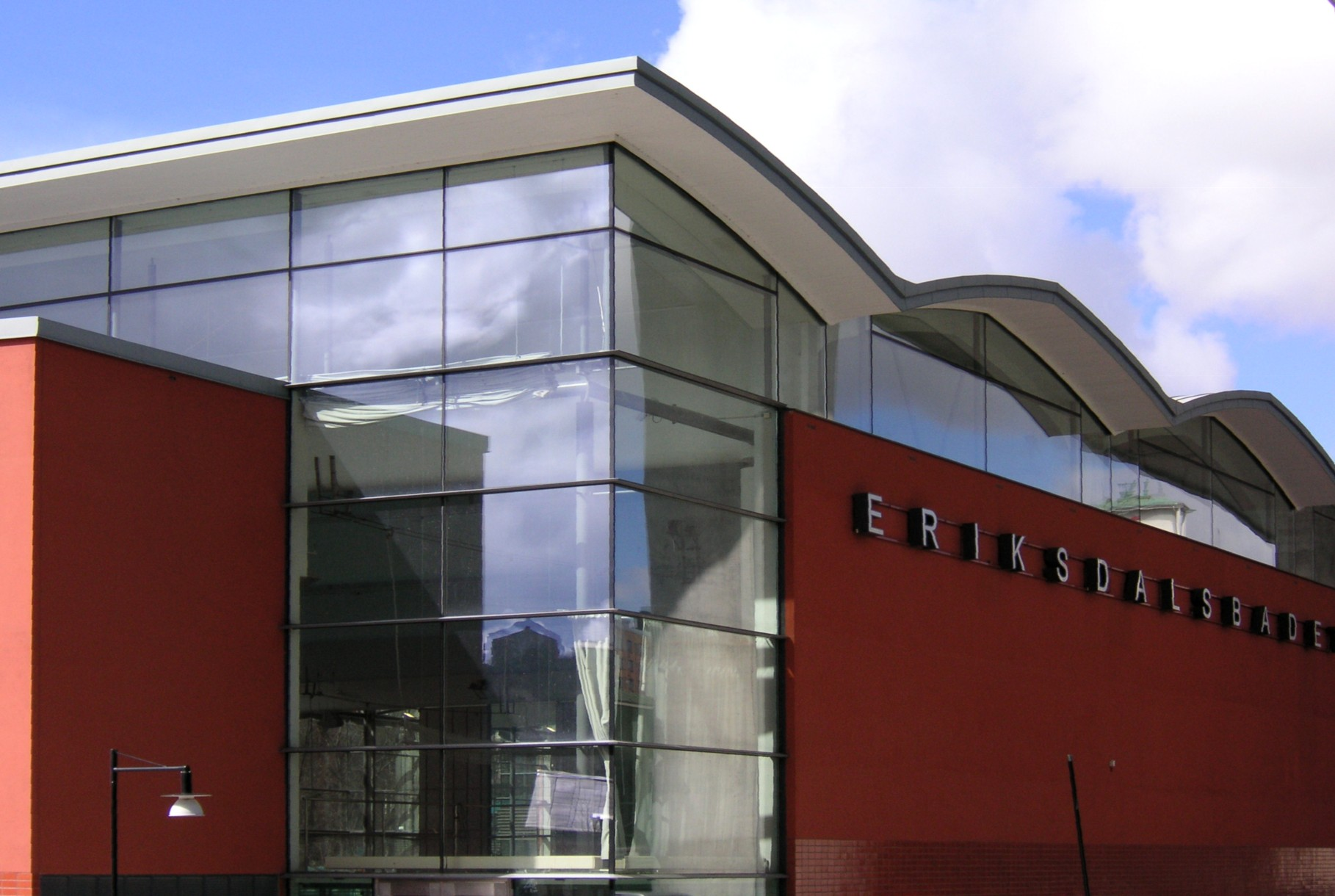
- Eriksdalsbadet in Stockholm, summer 2006
- Interactive map of Eriksdalsbadet
- Full name: Eriksdalsbadet
- Address: Stockholm, Sweden

Tenants
- SoIK Hellas; SK Neptun; Stockholms KK; Stockholmspolisens IF

Eriksdalsbadet is the biggest swimming centre in Stockholm, Sweden The outdoor pool was built for the 1962 European Aquatics Championships. The new Eriksdalsbadet was built 1999 and was designed by architect Björn Thynberger.

== Facilities ==
It has:

- 25 m swimming pool with a depth of mostly 2.5 m but it varies due to a specially-constructed raisable floor. Hosting FINA Swimming World Cup and Arena Diving Champions Cup annually.
- 50 m pool (Olympic size swimming pool) with a depth of 2.20 m at the edges and 2.60 m in the middle of the pool
- 50 m outdoor pool
- bubble pools
- learning pool
- "Lilla bassängen", the small pool, also with a raisable floor, most commonly 90 cm deep
- diving tower with 3.5 m and 10 m high platforms
- an adventure world for children

The water temperature is usually 27 degrees Celsius.

SK Neptun, Stockholmspolisens IF, SoIK Hellas, Stockholms KK and Spårvägens SF all use Eriksdalsbadet for training.

=== Security issues ===
After an increase of sexual harassment, the direction chose to institute gender segregated jacuzzi in 2016. That measure was found insufficient to stop the incidents as a group of boys harassed girls in the adventure bath and therefore extra security guards were hired and security cameras were installed. The sales of the annual memberships decreased 11% between February 2015 and February 2016. The local municipality stated that "the debate about sexual harassment at the premises", rather than the harassment itself, had decreased sales.

In 2016, reports of possible sexual abuse in pools used by both men and women prompted officials at the Eriksdalsbadet to separate the pools by gender on certain occasions, with one for women and one for men. According to unit manager Sara Franzén Shilwan, Eriksdalsbadet takes all reports of abuse seriously, and "all incidents are reported to the police."
