= Simhallsbadet, Helsingborg =

Swimming venue in Helsingborg, Sweden

Coordinates: 56.039062°N 12.703114°E

Simhallsbadet
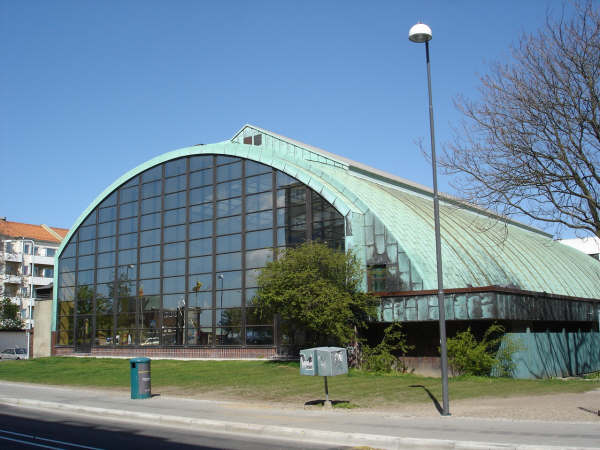
- Interactive map of Simhallsbadet
- Address: Helsingborg, Sweden

Construction
- Opened: 1941
- Architect: Mogens Mogensen

Simhallsbadet is a swimming venue in Helsingborg. It hosts a 25-metre swimming pool, another smaller pool and a sauna.

The building was designed by the Swedish architect Mogens Mogensen and completed in 1941. Mogensen had presented the plans in 1936; it was built between 1939 and 1941. Simhallsbadet was built as part of a project to address sanitation problems in south Helsingborg. The building is built in brown Helsingborg brick. The entrance part is built in a functionalistic style, while the pool section has a vaulted copper roof and a glass facade facing the street Carl Krooks gata.

The building was renovated in 2001.
