= Swimming at the 1920 Summer Olympics – Men's 400 metre breaststroke =

Men's 400 metre breaststroke at the Games of the VII Olympiad
- Venue: Stade Nautique d'Antwerp
- Dates: August 22–25
- Competitors: 20 from 10 nations

Medalists
1st place, gold medalist(s)		Håkan Malmrot	Sweden
2nd place, silver medalist(s)		Thor Henning	Sweden
3rd place, bronze medalist(s)		Arvo Aaltonen	Finland

The men's 400 metre breaststroke was a swimming event held as part of the swimming at the 1920 Summer Olympics programme. It was the third and last appearance of the event.

A total of 20 swimmers from ten nations competed in the event, which was held from Sunday, August 22 to Wednesday, August 25, 1920.

== Records ==
These were the standing world and Olympic records (in minutes) prior to the 1920 Summer Olympics.

World record	6:14.4	(United Kingdom) Percy Courtman	?	1912
Olympic record	6:29.6	(Germany) Walter Bathe	Stockholm (SWE)	July 12, 1912

== Results ==
=== Quarterfinals ===
The fastest two in each heat and the fastest third-placed from across the heats advanced.

==== Quarterfinal 1 ====
Rank	Swimmer	Nation	Time	Notes
1	Thor Henning	Sweden	6:46.2	Q
2	Lucien Lebaillif	France	7:12.2	Q
3	Mike McDermott	United States	7:12.8	q
4	Rex Lassam	Great Britain	Unknown	
—	Sidney Gooday	Canada	DNF	

==== Quarterfinal 2 ====
Rank	Swimmer	Nation	Time	Notes
1	Håkan Malmrot	Sweden	6:49.0	Q
2	Arvo Aaltonen	Finland	6:50.0	Q
3	Félicien Courbet	Belgium	7:20.0	
4	Charles Quinby	United States	Unknown	
—	Luis Balcells	Spain	DNF	

==== Quarterfinal 3 ====
Rank	Swimmer	Nation	Time	Notes
1	Jack Howell	United States	6:57.0	Q
2	Per Cederblom	Sweden	7:14.0	Q
3	George Robertson	Great Britain	7:28.0	
4	Émile Arbogast	France	Unknown	
5	Édouard Henry	Belgium	Unknown	

==== Quarterfinal 4 ====
Rank	Swimmer	Nation	Time	Notes
1	Olle Dickson	Sweden	7:12.0	Q
2	Henri Demiéville	Switzerland	7:12.4	Q
3	Stephen Ruddy	United States	7:13.0	
4	Édouard Van Haelen	Belgium	Unknown	
5	Eduard Stibor	Czechoslovakia	Unknown	

=== Semifinals ===
The fastest two in each semifinal and the faster of the two third-placed swimmer advanced to the final.

==== Semifinal 1 ====
Rank	Swimmer	Nation	Time	Notes
1	Håkan Malmrot	Sweden	6:44.8	Q
2	Per Cederblom	Sweden	7:05.6	Q
3	Mike McDermott	United States	7:13.2	
4	Henri Demiéville	Switzerland	Unknown	

==== Semifinal 2 ====
Rank	Swimmer	Nation	Time	Notes
1	Arvo Aaltonen	Finland	6:45.0	Q
1	Thor Henning	Sweden	6:45.0	Q
3	Jack Howell	United States	6:51.4	q
4	Olle Dickson	Sweden	6:59.0	
5	Lucien Lebaillif	France	Unknown	

=== Final ===
Rank	Swimmer	Nation	Time
1st place, gold medalist(s)	Håkan Malmrot	Sweden	6:31.8
2nd place, silver medalist(s)	Thor Henning	Sweden	6:45.2
3rd place, bronze medalist(s)	Arvo Aaltonen	Finland	6:48.0
4	Jack Howell	United States	6:51.0
5	Per Cederblom	Sweden	Unknown
