= Swimming at the 1920 Summer Olympics – Men's 200 metre breaststroke =

Men's 200 metre breaststroke at the Games of the VII Olympiad
- Venue: Stade Nautique d'Antwerp
- Dates: August 26–29
- Competitors: 24 from 11 nations

Medalists
1st place, gold medalist(s)		Håkan Malmrot	Sweden
2nd place, silver medalist(s)		Thor Henning	Sweden
3rd place, bronze medalist(s)		Arvo Aaltonen	Finland

The men's 200 metre breaststroke was a swimming event held as part of the swimming at the 1920 Summer Olympics programme. It was the third appearance of the event.

A total of 24 swimmers from 11 nations competed in the event, which was held from Thursday, August 26 to Sunday, August 29, 1920.

Despite Erich Rademacher from Germany being one of the fastest breaststroker in the world at the time, he was not able to compete due to Germany's role in WWI. Despite this, he would establish his dominance in the event by laying consistent claim to the world record through most of the next decade.

== Records ==
These were the standing world and Olympic records (in minutes) prior to the 1920 Summer Olympics.

World record	2:56.6	(United Kingdom) Percy Courtman	Garston (GBR)	July 28, 1914
Olympic record	3:01.8	(Germany) Walter Bathe	Stockholm (SWE)	July 12, 1912

== Results ==
=== Quarterfinals ===
Thursday, August 26, 1920: The fastest two in each heat and the fastest third-placed from across the heats advanced.

==== Heat 1 ====
Place	Swimmer	Time	Qual.
1	Jack Howell (USA)	3:09.8	Q
2	Per Cederblom (SWE)	3:12.2	Q
3	Édouard Henry (BEL)	3:18.0	
4	Rex Lassam (GBR)		
5	Sydney Gooday (CAN)		

==== Heat 2 ====
Place	Swimmer	Time	Qual.
1	Olle Dickson (SWE)	3:16.0	Q
2	Mike McDermott (USA)	3:16.4	Q
3	Paul Neeckx (BEL)	3:16.6	q
4	Théodore Michel (LUX)		
5	Émile Arbogast (FRA)		
6	Ernest Parker (GBR)		

==== Heat 3 ====
Place	Swimmer	Time	Qual.
1	Håkan Malmrot (SWE)	3:04.0	Q
2	Arvo Aaltonen (FIN)	3:11.6	Q
3	Édouard Van Haelen (BEL)	3:22.6	
4	Stephen Ruddy (USA)		
5	Eduard Stibor (TCH)		
6	George Robertson (GBR)		

==== Heat 4 ====
Place	Swimmer	Time	Qual.
1	Thor Henning (SWE)	3:12.8	Q
2	Ivan Stedman (AUS)	3:18.8	Q
3	William Stoney (GBR)	3:20.8	
4	Herbert Taylor (USA)		
5	Lucien Lebaillif (FRA)		
6	Luis Balcells (ESP)		
7	Félicien Courbet (BEL)		

=== Semifinals ===
Saturday, August 28, 1920: The fastest two in each semi-final and the faster of the two third-placed swimmer advanced to the final. Since both third-place swimmers had the same time, both advanced to the final.

Semifinal 1

Place	Swimmer	Time	Qual.
1	Jack Howell (USA)	3:10.8	Q
2	Per Cederblom (SWE)	3:14.6	Q
3	Thor Henning (SWE)	3:16.0	q
4	Olle Dickson (SWE)		
5	Paul Neeckx (BEL)		

Semifinal 2

Place	Swimmer	Time	Qual.
1	Håkan Malmrot (SWE)	3:09.0	Q
2	Arvo Aaltonen (FIN)	3:12.4	Q
3	Ivan Stedman (AUS)	3:16.0	q
4	Mike McDermott (USA)		

=== Final ===
Sunday, August 29, 1920:

Place	Swimmer	Time
1	Håkan Malmrot (SWE)	3:04.4
2	Thor Henning (SWE)	3:09.2
3	Arvo Aaltonen (FIN)	3:12.2
4	Jack Howell (USA)	
5	Ivan Stedman (AUS)	
—	Per Cederblom (SWE)	DNF

== Notes ==
- Belgium Olympic Committee (1957). Olympic Games Antwerp 1920: Official Report (in French).
- Wudarski, Pawel (1999). "Wyniki Igrzysk Olimpijskich" (in Polish).
