= Swimming at the 1912 Summer Olympics – Men's 200 metre breaststroke =

Men's 200 metre breaststroke at the Games of the V Olympiad
- Venue: Djurgårdsbrunnsviken
- Dates: July 7–12
- Competitors: 24 from 11 nations

Medalists
| 1st place, gold medalist(s) | | Walter Bathe | Germany |
| 2nd place, silver medalist(s) | | Wilhelm Lützow | Germany |
| 3rd place, bronze medalist(s) | | Paul Malisch | Germany |

The men's 200 metre breaststroke was a swimming event held as part of the swimming at the 1912 Summer Olympics programme. It was the second appearance of the event, which had been introduced in 1908. Germany swept the medals in the event. The competition was held from Sunday July 7, 1912 to Friday July 12, 1912.

Twenty-four swimmers from eleven nations competed.

== Records ==
These were the standing world and Olympic records (in minutes) prior to the 1912 Summer Olympics.

| World record | 3:00.8 | (Belgium) Félicien Courbet | Schaerbeek (BEL) | October 2, 1910 |
| Olympic record | 3:09.2 | (United Kingdom) Frederick Holman | London (GBR) | July 18, 1908 |

The Germans also took the Olympic record, with Lützow breaking it in the first heat and Bathe then proceeding to set it even higher each of the three times he raced. His gold medal winning time in the final, 3:01.8, stood as the Olympic record at the end.

== Results ==
=== Quarterfinals ===
The top two in each heat advanced along with the fastest loser overall.

==== Quarterfinal 1 ====
| Place | Swimmer | Time | Qual. |
|---|---|---|---|
| 1 | Wilhelm Lützow (GER) | 3:07.4 | QS OR |
| 2 | Thor Henning (SWE) | 3:14.0 | QS |
| 3 | Lennart Lindroos (FIN) | 3:16.6 | qs |
| 4 | Frank Schryver (ANZ) | 3:24.0 | |

==== Quarterfinal 2 ====
| Place | Swimmer | Time | Qual. |
|---|---|---|---|
| 1 | Paul Malisch (GER) | 3:08.8 | QS |
| 2 | Arvo Aaltonen (FIN) | 3:13.0 | QS |
| 3 | Nils Andersson (SWE) | 3:20.6 | |
| 4 | Josef Wastl (AUT) | 3:25.6 | |
| 5 | Georgy Baimakov (RUS) | 3:29.0 | |

==== Quarterfinal 3 ====
| Place | Swimmer | Time | Qual. |
|---|---|---|---|
| 1 | Carlyle Atkinson (GBR) | 3:12.0 | QS |

==== Quarterfinal 4 ====
| Place | Swimmer | Time | Qual. |
|---|---|---|---|
| 1 | Walter Bathe (GER) | 3:03.4 | QS OR |
| 2 | Percy Courtman (GBR) | 3:09.8 | QS |
| 3 | Fredrik Löwenadler (SWE) | 3:22.2 | |
| — | Mike McDermott (USA) | DSQ | |

==== Quarterfinal 5 ====
| Place | Swimmer | Time | Qual. |
|---|---|---|---|
| 1 | Félicien Courbet (BEL) | 3:12.6 | QS |
| 2 | Pontus Hanson (SWE) | 3:14.2 | QS |
| — | George Innocent (GBR) | DSQ | |
| — | Audun Rusten (NOR) | DSQ | |

==== Quarterfinal 6 ====
| Place | Swimmer | Time | Qual. |
|---|---|---|---|
| 1 | Oszkár Demján (HUN) | 3:07.8 | QS |
| 2 | Harald Julin (SWE) | 3:12.8 | QS |
| 3 | Herman Cederberg (FIN) | 3:18.6 | |
| 4 | Vilhelm Lindgrén (FIN) | 3:21.2 | |
| 5 | Sven Hanson (SWE) | 3:24.4 | |
| 6 | Oscar Hamrén (SWE) | | |

=== Semifinals ===
The top two from each heat and the faster of the two third place swimmers advanced.

Semifinal 1

| Place | Swimmer | Time | Qual. |
|---|---|---|---|
| 1 | Paul Malisch (GER) | 3:09.6 | QF |
| 2 | Thor Henning (SWE) | 3:10.4 | QF |
| 3 | Harald Julin (SWE) | 3:10.6 | |
| 4 | Lennart Lindroos (FIN) | 3:11.6 | |
| 5 | Carlyle Atkinson (GBR) | 3:15.2 | |
| 6 | Arvo Aaltonen (FIN) | 3:17.0 | |

Semifinal 2

| Place | Swimmer | Time | Qual. |
|---|---|---|---|
| 1 | Walter Bathe (GER) | 3:02.2 | QF OR |
| 2 | Wilhelm Lützow (GER) | 3:04.4 | QF |
| 3 | Percy Courtman (GBR) | 3:09.4 | qf |
| 4 | Oszkár Demján (HUN) | 3:11.2 | |
| 5 | Félicien Courbet (BEL) | 3:11.6 | |
| — | Pontus Hanson (SWE) | DNF | |

=== Final ===
| Place | Swimmer | Time |
|---|---|---|
| 1 | Walter Bathe (GER) | 3:01.8 OR |
| 2 | Wilhelm Lützow (GER) | 3:05.0 |
| 3 | Paul Malisch (GER) | 3:08.0 |
| 4 | Percy Courtman (GBR) | 3:08.8 |
| — | Thor Henning (SWE) | DNF |

== Notes ==
- Bergvall, Erik, ed. (1913). The Official Report of the Olympic Games of Stockholm 1912. Translated by Adams-Ray, Edward. Stockholm: Wahlström & Widstrand.
- Wudarski, Pawel (1999). "Wyniki Igrzysk Olimpijskich" (in Polish).
