= Swimming at the 1912 Summer Olympics – Men's 400 metre breaststroke =

Men's 400 metre breaststroke at the Games of the V Olympiad
- Venue: Djurgårdsbrunnsviken
- Dates: July 8–12
- Competitors: 17 from 10 nations

Medalists
1st place, gold medalist(s)		Walter Bathe	Germany
2nd place, silver medalist(s)		Thor Henning	Sweden
3rd place, bronze medalist(s)		Percy Courtman	Great Britain

The men's 400 metre breaststroke was a swimming event held as part of the swimming competition at the 1912 Summer Olympics. It was the second appearance of the event, which had been introduced (as the 440 yard breaststroke) in 1904. The competition was held from Monday July 8, 1912 to Friday July 12, 1912.

Seventeen swimmers from ten nations competed.

The final of the event was a rematch of the five swimmers who had competed in the final of the 200 metre race. Bathe won once again (and indeed, set a new Olympic record each time he raced in both breaststroke events), with Henning providing a stiff challenge in the semifinals. Neither Lützow nor Malisch were able to medal in the longer race, as Henning took silver and Courtman finished third.

== Records ==
These were the standing world and Olympic records (in minutes) prior to the 1912 Summer Olympics.

World record		?		
Olympic record	7:23.6(*)	(Germany) Georg Zacharias	St. Louis (USA)	September 7, 1904

(*) 440 yards (= 402.34 m)

In the first heat Thor Henning set a new Olympic record with 6:52.4 minutes. Only to be improved in the second heat by Paul Malisch who swam 6:47.0 minutes. In the fourth heat Percy Courtman improved the Olympic record with 6:43.8 minutes. And again one heat later in the fifth run Walter Bathe swam 6:34.6. In the first semi-final Bathe and Henning bettered the record with 6:32.0 minutes. Bathe was able to improve the record in the final with 6:29.6 minutes.

== Results ==
=== Quarterfinals ===
Monday July 8, 1912: The top two in each heat advanced along with the fastest loser overall.

==== Quarterfinal 1 ====
Oszkár Demján was disqualified, because he touched the wall with only one hand at the second turn.

Rank	Swimmer	Nation	Time	Notes
1	Thor Henning	Sweden	6:52.4	Q, OR
2	George Innocent	Great Britain	7:07.8	Q
—	Josef Wastl	Austria	DNF	
—	Oszkár Demján	Hungary	DQ (6:35.8)	

==== Quarterfinal 2 ====
Rank	Swimmer	Nation	Time	Notes
1	Paul Malisch	Germany	6:47.0	Q, OR
2	Lennart Lindroos	Finland	7:03.0	Q
3	Nils Andersson	Sweden	7:17.0	
—	Mike McDermott	United States	DQ (7:07.0)	

==== Quarterfinal 3 ====
Rank	Swimmer	Nation	Time	Notes
1	Wilhelm Lützow	Germany	6:49.8	Q
2	Félicien Courbet	Belgium	6:52.6	Q
3	Zeno von Singalewicz	Austria	7:04.0	q
4	Frank Schryver	Australasia	7:07.8	

==== Quarterfinal 4 ====
Rank	Swimmer	Nation	Time	Notes
1	Percy Courtman	Great Britain	6:43.8	Q, OR
2	Arvo Aaltonen	Finland	6:48.8	Q
3	Vilhelm Lindgrén	Finland	7:12.6	

==== Quarterfinal 5 ====
Rank	Swimmer	Nation	Time	Notes
1	Walter Bathe	Germany	6:34.6	Q, OR
2	Georgy Baimakov	Russian Empire	7:28.6	Q

=== Semifinals ===
Thursday July 11, 1912: The top two from each heat and the faster of the two third place swimmers advanced.

==== Semifinal 1 ====
Rank	Swimmer	Nation	Time	Notes
1	Walter Bathe	Germany	6:32.0	Q, OR
2	Thor Henning	Sweden	6:32.0	Q, OR
3	Percy Courtman	Great Britain	6:36.6	q
4	Félicien Courbet	Belgium	6:59.8	
—	Zeno von Singalewicz	Austria	DNF	
—	Georgy Baimakov	Russian Empire	DNS	

==== Semifinal 2 ====
Rank	Swimmer	Nation	Time	Notes
1	Wilhelm Lützow	Germany	6:44.6	Q
2	Paul Malisch	Germany	6:47.6	Q
3	Arvo Aaltonen	Finland	6:56.8	
4	Lennart Lindroos	Finland	7:02.4	
—	George Innocent	Great Britain	DNF	

=== Final ===
Friday July 12, 1912:

Rank	Swimmer	Nation	Time	Notes
1st place, gold medalist(s)	Walter Bathe	Germany	6:29.6	OR
2nd place, silver medalist(s)	Thor Henning	Sweden	6:35.6	
3rd place, bronze medalist(s)	Percy Courtman	Great Britain	6:36.4	
4	Paul Malisch	Germany	6:37.0	
—	Wilhelm Lützow	Germany	DNF	

== Notes ==
- Bergvall, Erik, ed. (1913). The Official Report of the Olympic Games of Stockholm 1912. Translated by Adams-Ray, Edward. Stockholm: Wahlström & Widstrand.
- Wudarski, Pawel (1999). "Wyniki Igrzysk Olimpijskich" (in Polish).
