= Paul Malisch =

German swimmer

Personal information
- Born: June 15, 1881 Landsberg an der Warthe, German Empire
- Died: April 9, 1970 (aged 88) West Berlin, West Germany

Sport
- Sport: Swimming
Medal record
Representing Germany
Olympic Games
| Bronze medal – third place | 1912 Stockholm | 200 m breaststroke |

Paul Kurt Malisch (June 15, 1881 – April 9, 1970) was a German breaststroke swimmer, who competed in the 1912 Summer Olympics. He was born in Landsberg an der Warthe. In the 200 metre breaststroke competition, he won the bronze medal next to his teammates Walter Bathe and Wilhelm Lützow. He finished fourth in the 400 metre breaststroke event.
