= Ernest Parker =

Ernest Parker may refer to:

- Ernest Parker (swimmer) (1895–1965), British swimmer
- Ernest L. Parker (1864–1934), American politician from Idaho
- Ernie Parker (1883–1918), Australian tennis player and cricketer
- Ernie Parker (footballer) (1913–1983), English footballer
- E. T. Parker (Ernest Tilden Parker, 1926–1991), American mathematician
- Ern Parker (William Ernest Parker, 1922–1974), Australian rules footballer
