= Swimming at the 1908 Summer Olympics – Men's 200 metre breaststroke =

Men's 200 metre breaststroke at the Games of the IV Olympiad
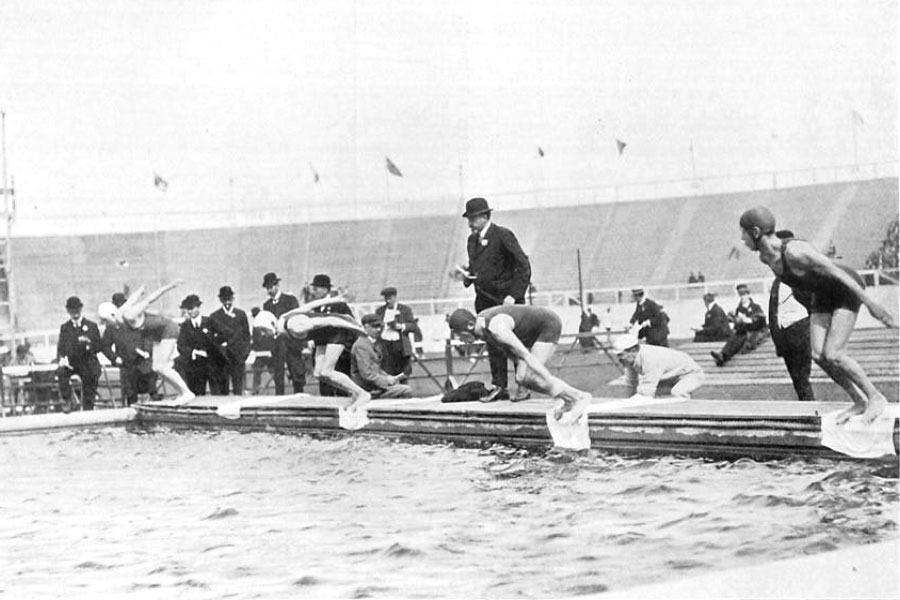
- The start of the final
- Venue: White City Stadium
- Dates: July 15–18
- Competitors: 27 from 10 nations

Medalists
1st place, gold medalist(s)		Frederick Holman	Great Britain
2nd place, silver medalist(s)		William Robinson	Great Britain
3rd place, bronze medalist(s)		Pontus Hanson	Sweden

The men's 200 metre breaststroke was one of 6 swimming events on the Swimming at the 1908 Summer Olympics programme. It was the only breaststroke event on the schedule. 1908 was the first appearance of the 200 metre breaststroke, as 1904 had seen the introduction of the stroke to Olympic competition with the 440 yard event. Each nation could enter up to 12 swimmers.

== Competition format ==
With a much larger field than in 1904, the 1908 competition expanded to three rounds: heats, semifinals, and a final. The 1908 Games also restored the wild-card system from 1900, allowing the fastest swimmers who did not win their heat to advance. The seven heats consisted of between 3 and 5 swimmers, with the winner of the heat advancing along with the fastest loser from across the heats (all tied swimmers advanced in the case of equal times). There were two semifinals, intended to be of 5 swimmers each but one of which actually had 6 due to a tie in the heats; the top 2 finishers in each semifinal (regardless of overall time) advanced to the 4-person final.

Each race involved two lengths of the 100 metre pool. The rules required that "both hands of the competitor must be pushed forward and brought backwards simultaneously, the shoulders must be kept perfectly in line with the surface of the water, and when touching at the turn . . . the touch shall be made with both hands" and that "the touch at the finish shall be made with both hands."

== Results ==
=== First round ===
The fastest swimmer in each heat and the fastest loser advanced, qualifying 8 swimmers for the semifinals.

==== Heat 1 ====
Place	Swimmer	Nation	Time
1	Frederick Holman	Great Britain	3:10.6
2	Richard Rösler	Germany	3:18.0
3	Max Gumpel	Sweden	Unknown

==== Heat 2 ====
Place	Swimmer	Nation	Time
1	Wilhelm Persson	Sweden	3:17.6
2	András Baronyi	Hungary	3:18.0
3	Augustus Goessling	United States	Unknown
4-5	Herman Cederberg	Finland	Unknown
4-5	Frederick Naylor	Great Britain	Unknown

==== Heat 3 ====
Place	Swimmer	Nation	Time
1	Erich Seidel	Germany	3:17.2
2	Hjalmar Johansson	Sweden	3:21.2
3	Alf Davies	Great Britain	Unknown
4	Pierre Strauwen	Belgium	Unknown

==== Heat 4 ====
Place	Swimmer	Nation	Time
1	Ödön Toldi	Hungary	3:14.4
2	Pontus Hanson	Sweden	3:15.0
3	Sydney Gooday	Great Britain	Unknown
4	Amilcare Beretta	Italy	Unknown

==== Heat 5 ====
Place	Swimmer	Nation	Time
1	William Robinson	Great Britain	3:13.0
2	Per Fjästad	Sweden	3:31.4
3	John Henriksson	Finland	Unknown
—	Edward Cooke	Australasia	Did not finish

==== Heat 6 ====
Place	Swimmer	Nation	Time
1	József Fabinyi	Hungary	3:23.4
2	Torsten Kumfeldt	Sweden	3:24.6
3	Harald Klem	Denmark	Unknown
—	Hugo Jonsson	Finland	Did not finish

==== Heat 7 ====
Place	Swimmer	Nation	Time
1	Félicien Courbet	Belgium	3:16.4
2	Percy Courtman	Great Britain	3:18.4
3	Adolf Andersson	Sweden	Unknown

=== Semifinals ===
The fastest two swimmers from each semifinal advanced to the final.

==== Semifinal 1 ====
Place	Swimmer	Nation	Time
1	Frederick Holman	Great Britain	3:10.0
2	Ödön Toldi	Hungary	3:16.4
3	Erich Seidel	Germany	Unknown
4	József Fabinyi	Hungary	Unknown

==== Semifinal 2 ====
Place	Swimmer	Nation	Time
1	William Robinson	Great Britain	3:11.8
2	Pontus Hanson	Sweden	3:13.0
3	Wilhelm Persson	Sweden	Unknown
4	Félicien Courbet	Belgium	Unknown

=== Final ===
Place	Swimmer	Nation	Time
1	Frederick Holman	Great Britain	3:09.2
2	William Robinson	Great Britain	3:12.8
3	Pontus Hanson	Sweden	3:14.6
4	Ödön Toldi	Hungary	3:15.2

== Sources ==
- Cook, Theodore Andrea (1908). The Fourth Olympiad, Being the Official Report. London: British Olympic Association.
- De Wael, Herman (2001). "Swimming 1908". Herman's Full Olympians.
