= Demján =

Demján or Demjan is a surname. Notable people with the surname include:

- Oszkár Demján (1891–1914), Hungarian swimmer
- Róbert Demjan (born 1982), Slovak footballer
- Sándor Demján (1943–2018), Hungarian businessman and entrepreneur
