= Fikentscher =

Fikentscher is a surname. Notable people with the surname include:

- Rüdiger Fikentscher (born 1941), German physician, politician, and academic
- Wolfgang Fikentscher (1928–2015), German jurist and legal anthropologist
