= Frederick Holman =

Frederick Holman may refer to:

- Frederick Van Voorhies Holman (1852–1927), American lawyer and civic leader in Portland, Oregon
- Frederick Holman (swimmer) (1885–1913), British breaststroke swimmer, gold medal winner in the 1908 Summer Olympics
