= Heinrich Lichner =

German composer (1829–1898)

Heinrich Lichner (6 March 1829 – 7 January 1898) was a prolific German composer, best known today for his teaching pieces - simple piano works written for students. He was born in Harpersdorf, Silesia. His sonatinas, including Opp. 4, 49, and 66 (among others) are in a light, fluent classical style, although the harmony occasionally betrays the influence of romanticism. He was also a director and organist - he worked as organist at the church of the 11,000 virgins, and spent a part of his life as the director of a saengerbund (choral festival) in Breslau, where he died.
