= Stephen Ruddy =

American swimmer (1901–1964)

Stephen Ruddy Jr.
- Stephen Ruddy Jr. circa 1920

Personal information
- Full name: Stephen Aloyisius Ruddy Jr.
- National team: United States
- Born: May 7, 1901 New York, New York, U.S.
- Died: January 1, 1964 (aged 62) New York, New York, U.S.
- Occupations: Construction contractor Naval Reserves
- Height: 5 ft 10 in (1.78 m)
- Spouse: Catherine Muller
- Relatives: Cousin Ray Ruddy; Uncle Joe Ruddy

Sport
- Sport: Swimming
- Event: 200, 220, 400 breaststroke
- Strokes: Breaststroke
- Club: New York Athletic Club (NYAC)
- Coach: Gus Sundstrom (NYAC); George "Dad" Center ('20 Olympics)

Stephen A. Ruddy Jr. (May 7, 1901 – January 1, 1964) was an American competition swimmer who competed and later served as a governor for the prominent program at the New York Athletic Club. He represented the United States at the 1920 Summer Olympics in Antwerp, Belgium competing in the 200 and 400-meter breastroke events, though he did not reach the finals. He served with the U.S. Navy in both World Wars, reaching the rank of Commander, and later worked as a construction contractor, retiring as a former President of Steven A. Ruddy Jr. Granite Contractor Co.

== Early life and family ==
Stephen Ruddy Jr. was born May 7, 1901 in greater New York City one of five siblings to father Steven Aloysius Ruddy Senior, and mother Rose. He came from a highly athletic family, several of whom were athletes and swimmers. Ruddy's father, also a competent swimmer, led the 16th Assembly District and was a leading Tammany Hall politician. Stephen Jr.'s cousin Ray Ruddy was a U.S. swimming Olympian in 1928, and in the 1936 Olympics in Berlin played water polo. Ruddy's Uncle Joe Ruddy participated for the U.S. in water polo at the 1904 Olympics, later serving as a team captain for the New York Athletic Club's team. Stephen Ruddy, who competed in swimming events by the age of 15, swam for the New York Athletic Club beginning by at least 1919, where he was coached through his Olympic years and beyond by Gus Sundstrom, who also coached the water polo team, and was the NYAC's Aquatic instructor from 1885-1935. Stephen's Uncle Joe Ruddy was also known to coach him occasionally. In an early race for the NYAC in April, 1919, Stephen Ruddy won a 100-yard handicap event with a time of 1:05.8.

== Athletic achievements ==
Like several of his family members, Ruddy also excelled in water polo, and played for the New York Athletic Club team that in 1922, 1929, and 1931 placed first in the US National Championship. He won a number of New York city-wide swimming championships, focusing largely on the 200 and 220 yard breaststroke distances. He held the New York metropolitan and American record of 2:50 in the 200-yard breaststroke in the early 1920's, and held a New York metropolitan record of 3:22.8 in the 220-yard breaststroke in July, 1922.

A month and a half before the Antwerp Olympics in 1920, Ruddy was in an accident in a taxi cab that crashed into a pillar in Long Island City. The cab was on its way to Manhattan. Arthur McAleenan, the other passenger in the taxi beside Ruddy, died in the accident, though Ruddy was not injured. McAleenan was a former Olympian in 1912, and was on the U.S. Olympic team planning to attend the 1920 Antwerp Olympics with Ruddy.

== 1920 Antwerp Olympics ==
At the 1920 Antwerp Olympics, Ruddy was coached by George "Dad" Center, an Hawaiian native born in Kipahulu, Maui to the owner of a sugar plantation. Though Coach Center's destiny was tied to the Hawaiian islands, he was not known to be of native ancestry. Center had been a highly successful coach in Hawaii, and had trained several outstanding Hawaiian swimmers with the Outrigger Canoe Club in Honolulu, Oahu. During his career, Center developed seven Olympic swimmers including Olympic gold medalist Buster Crabbe, and native Hawaiians that included Olympic gold medalist Duke Kahanamoku, and 1920 Olympic 100-meter breastroke gold medalist Warren Kealoha.

In late August, Ruddy competed in the preliminary heats of the men's 200-meter breaststroke at the 1920 Antwerp Olympics. Ruddy placed fourth in the third 200-meter breast preliminary heat and did not advance to the finals. Hakan Malrot of Sweden placed first for the gold with a time of 3:04.4, another Swede, Thor Henning placed second for the silver with a time of 3:09.2, and Arvo Aaltonen of Finland placed third for the bronze with a time of 3:12.12.

At the 1920 Antwerp Olympics, Ruddy also swam in one of his signature events, the men's 400-meter breaststroke, placing third in the fourth heat with a time of 7:13.0 but did not advance. Each of the medalists went under 7 minutes for the distance. Hakan Malrot of Sweden took the gold with a time of 6:31.8, Thor Henning of Sweden took the Silver with a time of 6:45.2, and Aarvo Aaltonon of Finland took the bronze with a time of 6:48.0. Gold medalist Hakan Malmrot barely won his preliminary match, however in the final round he won by a comfortable 14 seconds over the silver medalist. The 400-meter distance was subsequently dropped from Olympic competition, and it is unlikely it will ever be part of Olympic competition in the future.

Establishing his place as a national competitor in the 440-yard breaststroke in August 1921 subsequent to the 1920 Olympics, Ruddy placed second with a time of 6:56.4 in the AAU national championship in the event, with Robert Skelton of the Illinois Athletic Club placing first with a time of 6:50.4. Ruddy led through the last 100 yards.

Ruddy qualified for the 1924 Olympics at the July 10-11 finals in Chicago, but did not attend as he was married that year to Catherine Muller.

=== U.S. Naval service ===
Ruddy was a naval veteran of both WWI and WWII. In WWI, during his eighteen month period of active service, he served on the gunboat USS Wasp, and three other ships, reaching the rank of quartermaster second class. After volunteering for WWII service and being commissioned as a Lieutenant JG at Annapolis in Spring, 1942, Ruddy served as head of the Naval Air Station's swimming program in greater Jacksonville, Florida. He taught sailors swimming and survival skills, and how to float for long periods, and help other sailors in distress. Ruddy Jr. also led games of water polo, a somewhat rough version of the sport, to teach sailors, and officers to gain confidence and strength in the water. In civilian life prior to WWII, Ruddy had already begun work as a construction contractor. He retired from the service as a Naval Commander after WWII. Stephen's brother Lieutenant Commander Thomas A. Ruddy of the United States Coast Guard Reserve died in Staten Island New York after an operation in a Marine Hospital on January 5, 1948. He had also been a veteran of both World Wars.

=== Careers ===
Ruddy worked as a construction contractor, and owned New York's Steven A. Ruddy Granite Contractor Co., from which he served as President and later retired. Active in the swimming community, Ruddy was an administrator with the New York Athletic Club, serving as governor from 1938-1942.

He died at the age of 62 at New York's Mount Sinai Hospital on January 1, 1964, subsequent to a short illness. Services were held at St. Ignasius Memorial Church on Park Avenue on the morning of January 4, 1964, and he was later buried at Mount Saint Mary Cemetery. Having last resided on East 81st street, he was survived by his wife Catherine, his son Stephen Ruddy III, and three sisters.
