= Henri Demiéville =

Swiss swimmer

Personal information
- Born: 1888
- Died: 23 November 1956 (aged 67–68) Geneva, Switzerland

Sport
- Sport: Swimming

Henri Demiéville (1888 – 23 November 1956) was a Swiss breaststroke swimmer. He competed in the men's 400 metre breaststroke event at the 1920 Summer Olympics and the water polo at the 1920 and 1924 Summer Olympics.
