= Per Cederblom =

Swedish swimmer

Personal information
- Born: 22 May 1901 Gothenburg, Sweden
- Died: 23 January 1987 (aged 85) Gothenburg, Sweden

Sport
- Sport: Swimming

Per Axel Hjalmar Cederblom (22 May 1901 – 23 January 1987) was a Swedish breaststroke swimmer who competed in the 1920 Summer Olympics. He was born and died in Gothenburg.

In 1920 he finished fifth in the 400 metre breaststroke competition. He also participated in the final of the 200 metre breaststroke event, but he did not finish the race.
