= Czaple, Lower Silesian Voivodeship =

Czaple
- Village
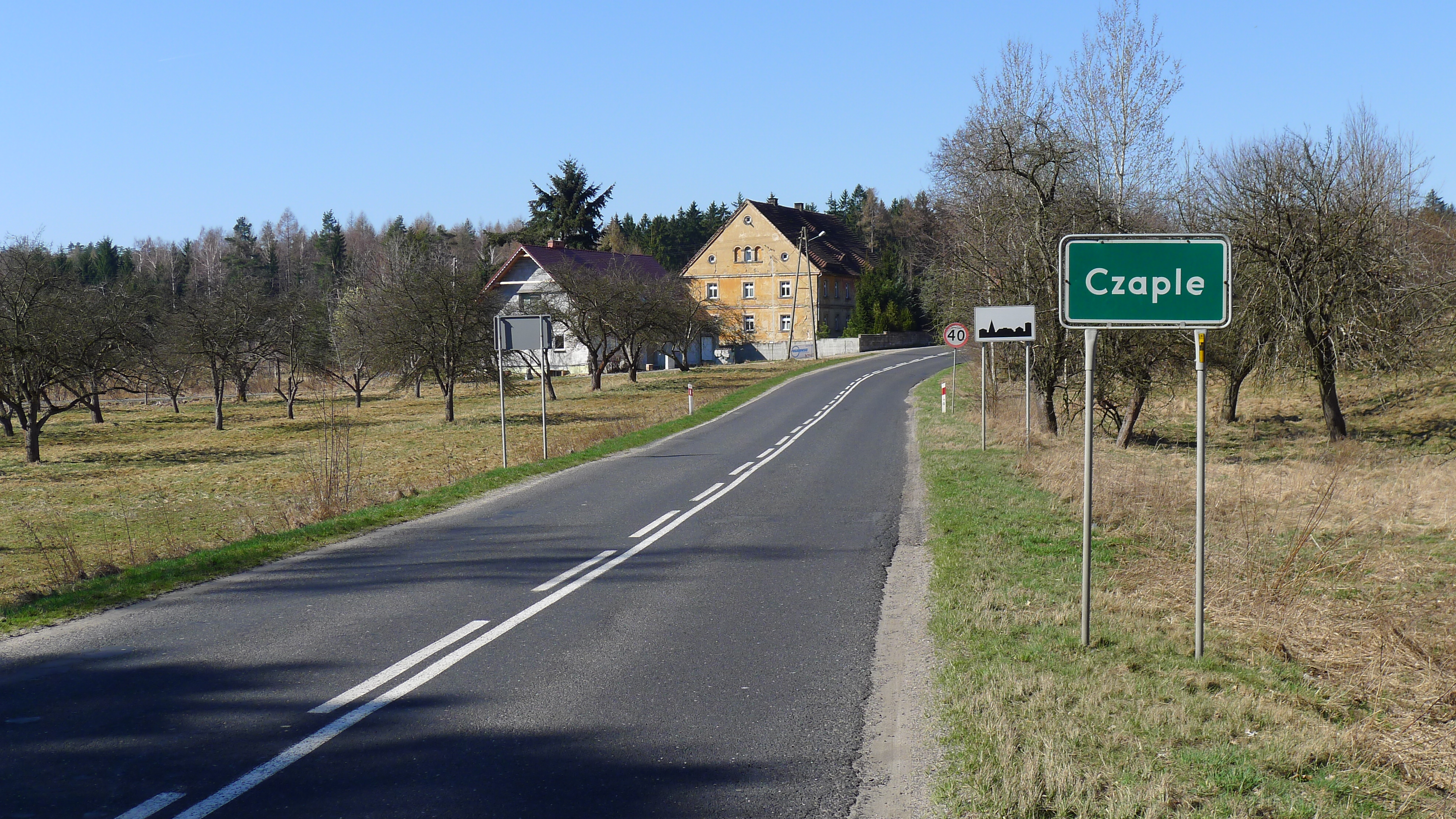
- Wjazd do Czapli od strony Pielgrzymki

- Location within Poland
- Coordinates: 51°07′55″N 15°44′30″E
- Country: Poland
- Voivodeship: Lower Silesian
- County: Złotoryja
- Gmina: Pielgrzymka
- Elevation: 240 m (790 ft)
- Population: 348

Czaple [ˈt͡ʂaplɛ] is a village in the administrative district of Gmina Pielgrzymka, within Złotoryja County, Lower Silesian Voivodeship, in south-western Poland.
