= Audun Rusten =

Norwegian swimmer (1894 - 1957)

Personal information
- Born: 11 June 1894 Bergen, Norway
- Died: 14 December 1957 (aged 63)

Sport
- Sport: Swimming

Audun Rusten (11 June 1894 – 14 December 1957) was a Norwegian swimmer. He competed in the men's 200 metre breaststroke event at the 1912 Summer Olympics.
