= Nowe Łąki =

- Village
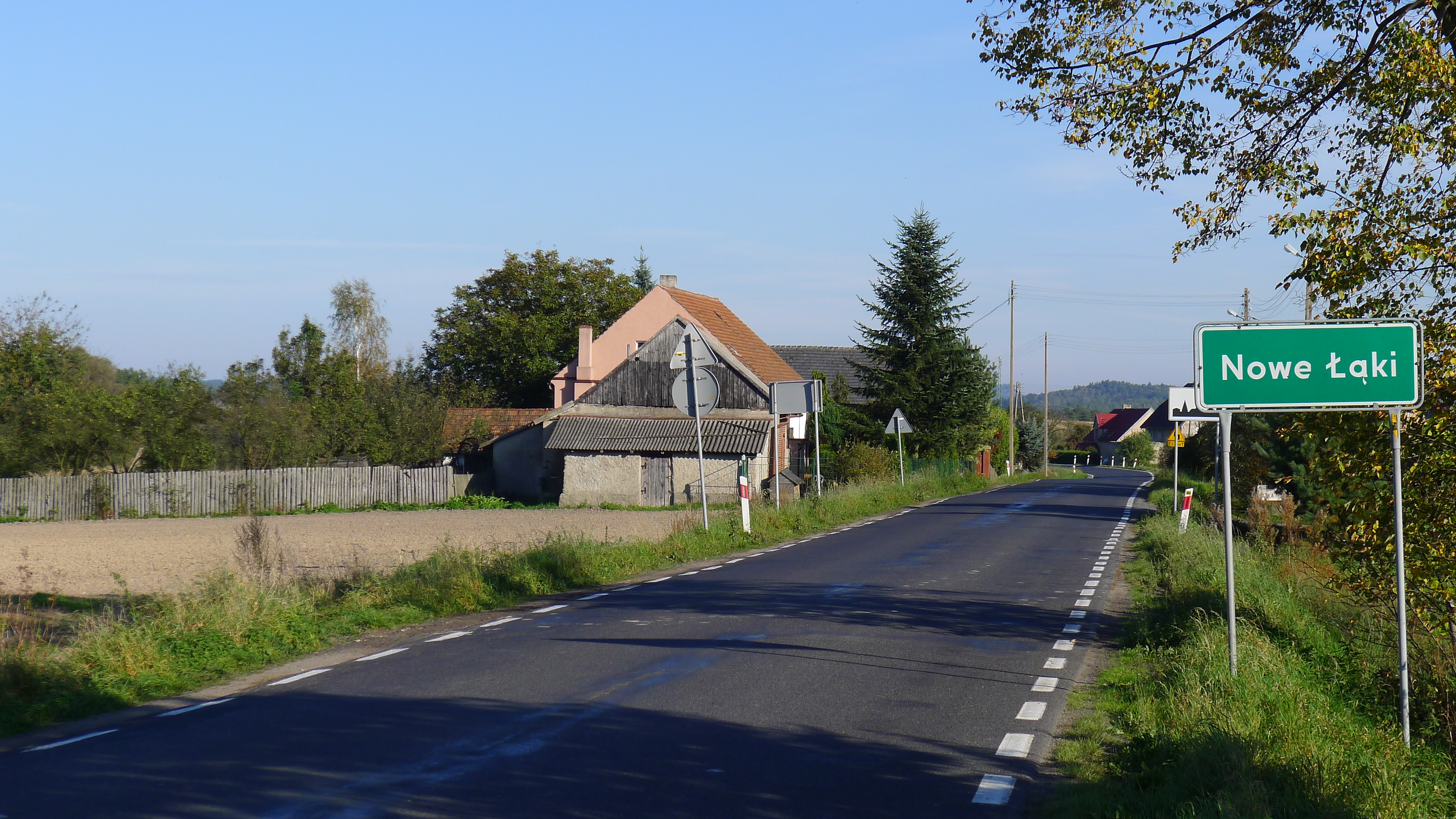
- Road sign in Nowe Łąki

- Location within Poland
- Coordinates: 51°07′07″N 15°46′29″E
- Country: Poland
- Voivodeship: Lower Silesian
- County: Złotoryja
- Gmina: Pielgrzymka

Nowe Łąki [ˈnɔvɛ ˈwɔŋki] is a village in the administrative district of Gmina Pielgrzymka, within Złotoryja County, Lower Silesian Voivodeship, in south-western Poland.
