= Gmina Pielgrzymka =

Gmina Pielgrzymka Pielgrzymka Commune
- Gmina
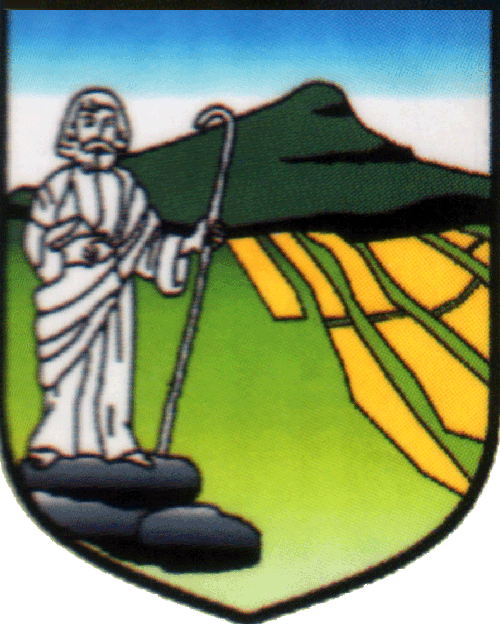
- Coat of arms
- Interactive map of Gmina Pielgrzymka
- Coordinates (Pielgrzymka): 51°07′11″N 15°48′55″E
- Country: Poland
- Voivodeship: Lower Silesian
- County: Złotoryja
- Seat: Pielgrzymka
- Sołectwos: Czaple, Nowa Wieś Grodziska, Nowe Łąki, Pielgrzymka, Proboszczów, Sędzimirów, Twardocice, Wojcieszyn

Area
  - Total: 105.15 km^{2} (40.60 sq mi)

Population (2019-06-30)
  - Total: 4,570
  - Density: 43.5/km^{2} (113/sq mi)
- Website: https://www.pielgrzymka.biz/

Gmina Pielgrzymka is a rural gmina (administrative district) in Złotoryja County, Lower Silesian Voivodeship, in south-western Poland. Its seat is the village of Pielgrzymka, which lies approximately 8 kilometres (5 mi) west of Złotoryja, and 86 kilometres (53 mi) west of the regional capital Wrocław.

The gmina covers an area of 105.15 square kilometres (40.6 sq mi), and as of 2019 its total population is 4,570.

== Neighbouring gminas ==
Gmina Pielgrzymka is bordered by the gminas of Lwówek Śląski, Świerzawa, Warta Bolesławiecka, Wleń, Zagrodno and Złotoryja.

== Villages ==
The gmina contains the villages of Czaple, Nowa Wieś Grodziska, Nowe Łąki, Pielgrzymka, Proboszczów, Sędzimirów, Twardocice and Wojcieszyn.
