= Olle Dickson =

Swedish swimmer

Personal information
- Born: January 16, 1901 Gothenburg, Sweden
- Died: June 6, 1995 (aged 94) Stockholm, Sweden

Sport
- Sport: Swimming
- Strokes: Breaststroke
- Club: SK Neptun

Olof Elis "Olle" Dickson (16 January 1901 – 6 June 1995) was a Swedish breaststroke swimmer who competed in the 1920 Summer Olympics. He was born in Gothenburg and died in Stockholm.

In 1920 he was eliminated in the semi-finals of the 200 metre breaststroke competition as well as in the semi-finals of the 400 metre breaststroke event.

Dickson represented SK Neptun.
