= Georgy Baimakov =

Russian swimmer

Personal information
- Born: 1 June 1894 Saint Petersburg, Russian Empire

Sport
- Sport: Swimming

Georgy Baimakov (born 1 June 1894, date of death unknown) was a Russian swimmer. He competed in the men's 200 metre breaststroke and men's 400 metre breaststroke events at the 1912 Summer Olympics.
