= Rüdiger Fikentscher =

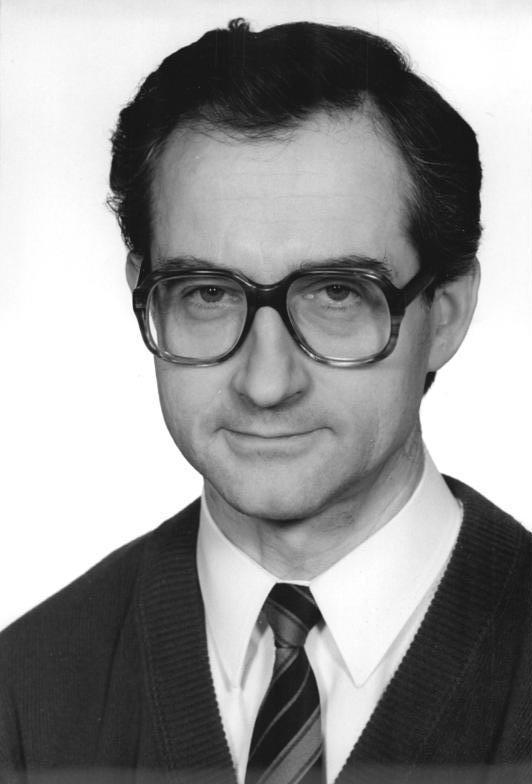
- Fikentscher in 1990
- Born: 30 January 1941 (age 85); Probsthain, Province of Lower Silesia, Prussia, Germany
- Occupations: Physician; University lecturer Politician
- Political party: New Forum; SPD

Rüdiger Fikentscher (born 30 January 1941) is a German politician and academic.

At the age of 48, during the period of changes that led, formally in 1990, to German reunification, Fikentscher switched to politics. As a member of the Social Democratic Party he was elected to the East German Volkskammer in the country's first—and last—free election. He has subsequently played a leading role in city and state politics in Saxony-Anhalt and in the Halle region.

== Biography ==
=== Early years and medical career ===
Fikentscher was born in Probsthain, a village in Lower Silesia roughly 90 km (55 miles) west of Breslau. When he was 4 war ended, in May 1945, and frontier changes mandated by the victorious powers involved the transfer of Silesia from Germany to Poland. Implementation of the changes was accompanied by a major programme of ethnic cleansing: Fikentscher's family was relocated to Zwickau where he grew up. He passed his School Finals exam (Abitur) in 1959 and then transferred to the Martin Luther University of Halle-Wittenberg where he studied between 1961 and 1967, the year in which he qualified as a medical doctor. He then trained for a specialty in Otorhinolaryngology (ear, nose and throat medicine), qualifying in 1972. A higher habilitation degree followed in 1974. Between 1972 and 1981 he worked as an Otorhinolaryngologist, employed as a senior doctor ("Oberarzt") till 1985 at the Halle University Clinic. Between 1985 and 1990 he worked as a university lecturer in his speciality at Halle. Prior to 1989 Fikentscher was not politically active.

=== Politics ===
Political changes in the Soviet Union and economic stagnation at home led to a loss in self-confidence by the East German ruling class during the 1980s, which towards the end of the decade was accompanied by an increasingly open and widespread growth in opposition to the political status quo. New Forum was founded in September 1989. New Forum was a form of independent political party in a country where traditionally the only political parties permitted to operate were those controlled by the ruling party. Rüdiger Fikentscher joined New Forum in September 1989. While the country's leaders, no longer able to rely on Soviet support for a repeat of the violent but effective repression of the 1953 uprising, hesitated over how to deal with New Forum, November 1989 saw a re-emergence in East Germany of the Social Democratic Party, some forty years after it had been controversially merged out of (independent) existence. Rüdiger Fikentscher joined the Social Democratic Party in November 1989. In February 1990 he was elected district chairman of the party's Halle branch.

The regional tier of government had been abolished in East Germany in 1952 as part of a programme to centralise political power, but East German states (Länder) were reinstated in 1990, and in August 1990 Rüdiger Fikentscher became the SPD party chairman for Saxony-Anhalt. The next month, in September 1990, the East German SPD and what at that point was seen as the West German SPD were reintegrated: Fikentscher continued to serve as SPD party chairman for Saxony-Anhalt till 2002. He also served, between 1990 and 2010, as a member of the SPD National Council (SPD-Bundesparteirats) and, between 1995 and 2006, as its chairman.

Through most of the country's existence, parliamentary elections in East Germany took place according to a "Single List" system. Voters were given a single list of candidates nominated by the party and invited to vote for it or against it. Voting against The List involved placing your voting slip in a separate ballot box while election officials looked on. The voting system was effective in ensuring that the party's list of candidates was endorsed by more than 99% the electorate, but it was not without its critics. For the 1990 General Election a new system was adopted, apparently inspired by the West German approach, whereby voters could choose between a number of different party lists. The 1990 election is generally reported as East Germany's first free general election (Die erste freie Volkskammerwahl). The SPD received 21.9% of the votes cast, which entitled it to 88 seats in the new 400 seat "Volkskammer" (National parliament). Although this was regarded as a disappointing result for the party, the name at the top of the list from the Halle district was that of Rüdiger Fikentscher, who was duly elected and took his seat. The coalition government that resulted was dominated by the centre-right CDU party, but the SPD also took part in the coalition, the number of its seats swollen from 88 to 91 through the defection of three members elected on the list of the Democratic Farmers' Party. Following reunification, on 3 October 1990, Fikentscher was not one of the SPD Assembly members to join the short-lived enlarged Bundestag for a unified Germany, pursuing instead a career in the regional legislative assembly, based in Magdeburg.

Rüdiger Fikentscher sat as a member of the Saxony-Anhalt Landtag (legislative assembly) between 1990 and 2011, representing the Halle 3 electoral district. From 1990 till 1994, and again between 2002 and 2011 he was one of the Assembly's two vice-presidents. During the intervening period, between 1994 and 2002, he was the leader of the SPD group in the chamber.

Since 2004 he has been a member of the Halle city council.

== Personal life ==
Fikentscher is married, and has two children.
