= Wilhelm Persson =

Swedish swimmer

Personal information
- Born: 4 January 1886 Stockholm, Sweden
- Died: 27 May 1955 (aged 69) Stockholm, Sweden

Sport
- Sport: Swimming

Wilhelm Persson (4 January 1886 – 27 May 1955) was a Swedish swimmer. He competed in the men's 200 metre breaststroke event at the 1908 Summer Olympics.

Persson represented Stockholms KK.
