= Mike McDermott (athlete) =

American swimmer (1893–1970)

- McDermott circa 1920 in Illinois Athletic Club Jersey

Personal information
- Full name: Michael James McDermott
- Nickname: "Turk"
- National team: United States
- Born: January 18, 1893 Chicago, Illinois, U.S.
- Died: October 19, 1970 (aged 77) Chicago, Illinois, U.S.
- Occupations: Illinois Athletic Club Director; Owner, McDermott Construction
- Spouse: Minnie Blossom McDermott (1917)

Sport
- Sport: Swimming
- Strokes: Breaststroke, water polo
- Club: Central Chicago YMCA; Chicago Athletic Assoc. (CAA); Illinois Athletic Club (IAC)
- Coach: William Bachrach (IAC); Swimming, Water Polo

Michael James McDermott (January 18, 1893 – October 19, 1970) was an American breaststroke swimmer and water polo player who competed in both the 1912 and 1920 Summer Olympics. A noted athlete, he was the U.S. indoor 200-yard breaststroke champion for nine successive years, and between 1914-17 played on four National Water Polo Championship teams with the Illinois Athletic Club. He served as a Director of the Illinois Athletic Club through the 1950s, and founded and operated M.J. McDermott and Company, a successful Chicago-based construction and general contracting firm.

Michael James McDermott was born into a large Catholic family, likely of Irish descent, on January 18, 1893 in Chicago, Illinois to Michael McDermott and Marie Etta O'Donnell, the third of around seven children. Initially swimming for Chicago's Central YMCA prior to 1910, from 1910-1913, he swam for the famed Chicago Athletic Association under swimming Director Meffert and subsequently swam for the Illinois Athletic Club.

== Swimming, water polo career ==
A swimming Champion in breaststroke by 17, McDermott first officially broke the world record for the 100-yard breaststroke on October 12, 1910, with a time of 1:11.6 which was registered by the National AAU committee. He had formerly broken the American record the prior year with a 1:16.8. By 1913, he swam for the Illinois Athletic Club, where for a significant portion of his swimming and water polo career he was coached by the IAC's swimming and water polo coach William Bachrach. Bachrach was an accomplished coach of Olympic swimmers and Water Polo teams, and was admitted to Halls of Fame in both swimming and Water Polo.

From 1910-1918, McDermott was a US indoor 200-yard breaststroke champion for nine successive years, a streak which is considered one of the longest for swimmers who won national championships. A member of an exceptional number of championship teams in swimming and water polo, he placed first in 32 national championships in the two sports. An outstanding distance swimmer as well, he placed first in the National American Athletic Union 10-mile swim in 1911, 1913, 1916, and 1917. Competing in water polo tournaments with the IAC between 1912-1924, he made major contributions as a player on the Illinois Athletic Club's water polo team leading them to National Championship in the four successive of 1914, 1915, 1916, and 1917.

=== Records ===
In January 1911, while still representing the Chicago Athletic Association, McDermott held the unofficial 100-yard breaststroke record of 1:11.8, set on October 12 in Chicago with four turns in a 20-yard pool. On December 31, 1916, McDermott held the unofficial record for the 100-yard breast-stroke outdoor swim of 1:10.8, and 2:45.2 for the outdoor 200-yard breast-stroke swim.

Representing the IAC under Coach Bachrach at the Illinois State Tournament in August 1914, McDermott tied for second in individual points and won the 200-yard breaststroke event with a time of 2:57.8. The IAC dominated the tournament winning every swimming event, and won the team championship soundly defeating the Chicago Athletic Association.

== 1912, 1920 Olympics ==
At the 1912 Olympics in Stockholm, Sweden he was disqualified in the 200-meter breaststroke event as well as in the 400-meter breaststroke competition. In the 200 metre breastroke he was timed at 3:18.2 in the third heat in which he received a disqualification. In the 200 metre breaststroke, he swam a 7:07.0 in the second preliminary heat and was disqualified.

Though McDermott was in peak condition in 1916, the Olympic games were cancelled that year due to WWI.

In the 1920 Olympics in Antwerp, Belgium, he was eliminated in the semi-finals of the 200-meter breaststroke event as well as in the semi-finals of the 400-meter breaststroke competition. In the 200-meter breaststroke, in the second heat he was timed at 3:16.4, and in the 400 metre breaststroke, he was timed at 7:13.2 in the third heat.

A former member of the Illinois Athletic Club's national championship team, he was also part of the American water polo team in the 1920 games which finished fourth in the Olympic tournament. The American team defeated Greece in the First Water Polo Match of the Quarterfinals 7-0, on August 24, but lost to Great Britain in the Semi-finals 7-2, eliminating them from the final round. The American Water Polo team later defeated Belgium 7-2 in a consolation round to determine the 2nd to 5th place finishers. McDermott played in two of the three matches.

=== Marriage and WWI ===
Minnie McDermott

At the age of 24, McDermott married Minnie Blossom McDermott on the evening of May 8, 1917 at the Bride's home in Will County, Illinois in Greater Chicago. Father O'Gara of Chicago's Corpus Christi Church presided. William Bachrach, McDermott's Swim coach at the Illinois Athletic Club was best man. Minnie's father was the President of a contracting firm that did painting and wall papering. The couple had only a brief time for a honeymoon before McDermott had to leave for Naval flight training six days later. McDermott enlisted in Flight Training with his brother Frank who also was an accomplished swimmer for the IAC.

Reaching the rank of Lieutenant, McDermott spent 11 months as a Naval aviator flying a dirigible in France with the American Expeditionary Force during World War I. Somewhat familiar with flying, he had been taken flying by French pilots in Europe after the Stockhom Olympics in 1912.

=== Post-athletic careers ===
McDermott was a director of the well-known Illinois Athletic Club from 1950-1963, managing the club that helped develop many of America's top Olympic swimmers and water polo players. Hall of Fame swimmers developed by the Illinois Athletic Club included Johnny Weissmuller, Sybil Bauer, Jam Handy, Harry Hebner, and Ethel Lackie.

In 1955, he was chairman of the Olympic Organizing Committee the year the American water polo team won the Pan American Games. After his athletic career ended, he founded and operated M.J. McDermott and Company, a successful Chicago-based general contracting firm.

Having resided for many years at Chicago's 400 East Randolph Street, McDermott died on October 19, 1977 at the age of 77 at Chicago's Mercy Hospital and was buried in the Mount Olivet Catholic Cemetery. He was survived by his wife Minnie of 60 years.

=== Honors ===
In 1955 McDermott was named to the prestigious Helms Athletic Foundation Hall of Fame for his swimming accomplishments. He was honored by the Illinois Athletic Club on several occasions.

McDermott was a recipient of the Missouri Athletic Trophy for placing first in the St. Louis Missouri ten mile swim three times.

He was elected to the USA Water Polo Hall of Fame in 1976 and officially inducted in 1980.

McDermott was inducted into the International Swimming Hall of Fame as an "Honor Swimmer" in 1969, and was inducted into the USA Water Polo Hall of Fame in 1976.

== See also ==
- List of members of the International Swimming Hall of Fame
