= Oscar Hamrén =

Swedish swimmer

Personal information
- Born: 19 September 1891 Stockholm, Sweden
- Died: 10 April 1960 (aged 68) Seattle, Washington, United States

Sport
- Sport: Swimming

Oscar Hamrén (19 September 1891 – 10 April 1960) was a Swedish swimmer. He competed in the men's 200 metre breaststroke event at the 1912 Summer Olympics.
