= Carlyle Atkinson =

British swimmer

Personal information
- Full name: Carlyle Atkinson
- National team: Great Britain
- Born: 4 December 1892 Darwen, England
- Died: 5 August 1968 (aged 75) Napier, New Zealand

Sport
- Sport: Swimming
- Strokes: Breaststroke

Carlyle Atkinson (4 December 1892 – 5 August 1968) was an English competitive swimmer who represented Great Britain at the 1912 Summer Olympics in Stockholm, Sweden. Atkinson advanced to the semi-finals of the men's 200-metre breaststroke before being eliminated. He finished ninth overall.

He was born in Darwen, Lancashire, England, and died in Napier, New Zealand.
