= Thor Henning =

Swedish swimmer (1894–1967)

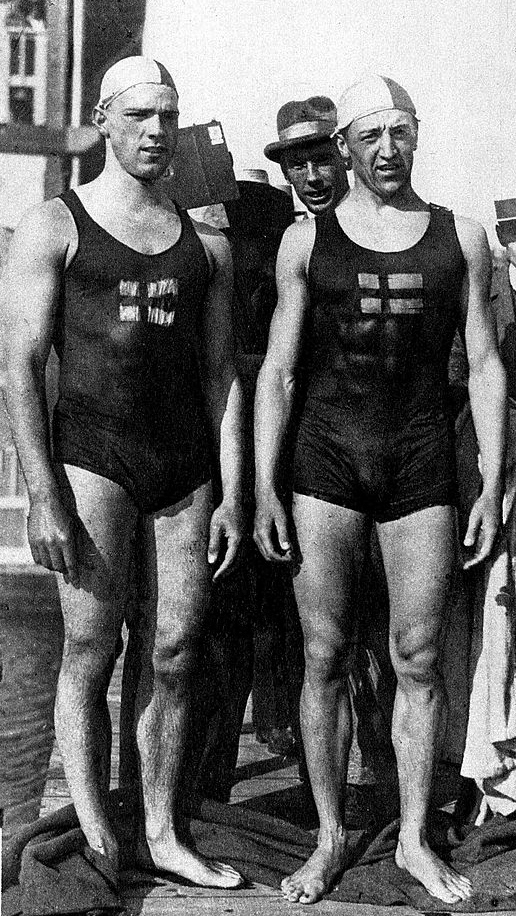
- Thor Henning (left) and Håkan Malmrot at the 1920 Olympics

Personal information
- Nationality: Swedish
- Born: 13 September 1894 Stockholm, Sweden
- Died: 7 October 1967 (aged 73) Stockholm, Sweden

Sport
- Country: Sweden
- Sport: Swimming
- Club: SK Neptun, Stockholm
Medal record
Representing Sweden
Summer Olympics
Silver medal – second place	1912 Stockholm	400 m breaststroke
Silver medal – second place	1920 Antwerp	200 m breaststroke
Silver medal – second place	1920 Antwerp	400 m breaststroke
Bronze medal – third place	1924 Paris	4×200 m freestyle

Thor Henning (13 September 1894 – 7 October 1967) was a Swedish breaststroke and freestyle swimmer who won four medals at the 1912, 1920 and 1924 Summer Olympics. At the 1912 Summer Olympics he came second after German Walter Bathe in the 400 m breaststroke, and in 1920 he was beaten by teammate Håkan Malmrot in the 200 m and 400 m breaststroke.

== See also ==
- List of members of the International Swimming Hall of Fame
