= Frank Schryver =

Australian swimmer

- Born: 31 October 1888; Perth, Western Australia
- Died: 3 February 1965 (aged 76)
- Military career
- Allegiance: Australia
- Branch: Australian Army
- Service years: 1914–1919; 1940–1947
- Rank: Sergeant
- Nickname: "Snow"
- Conflicts: First World War; Second World War
- Awards: Distinguished Conduct Medal; Military Medal

Francis Esdale Schryver, DCM, MM (31 October 1888 – 3 February 1965) was an Australian soldier and swimmer. He competed for Australasia at the 1912 Summer Olympics in the men's 200 metre breaststroke and the men's 400 metre breaststroke. In doing so, he became the first Western Australian to represent Australia at an Olympic Games.

Schryver also served with the Australian Imperial Force in the First World War. A stretcher-bearer with the 2nd Australian Stationary Hospital for much of the war, he was awarded the Distinguished Conduct Medal and Military Medal for bravery on the Western Front.
