= Sędzimirów =

- Village
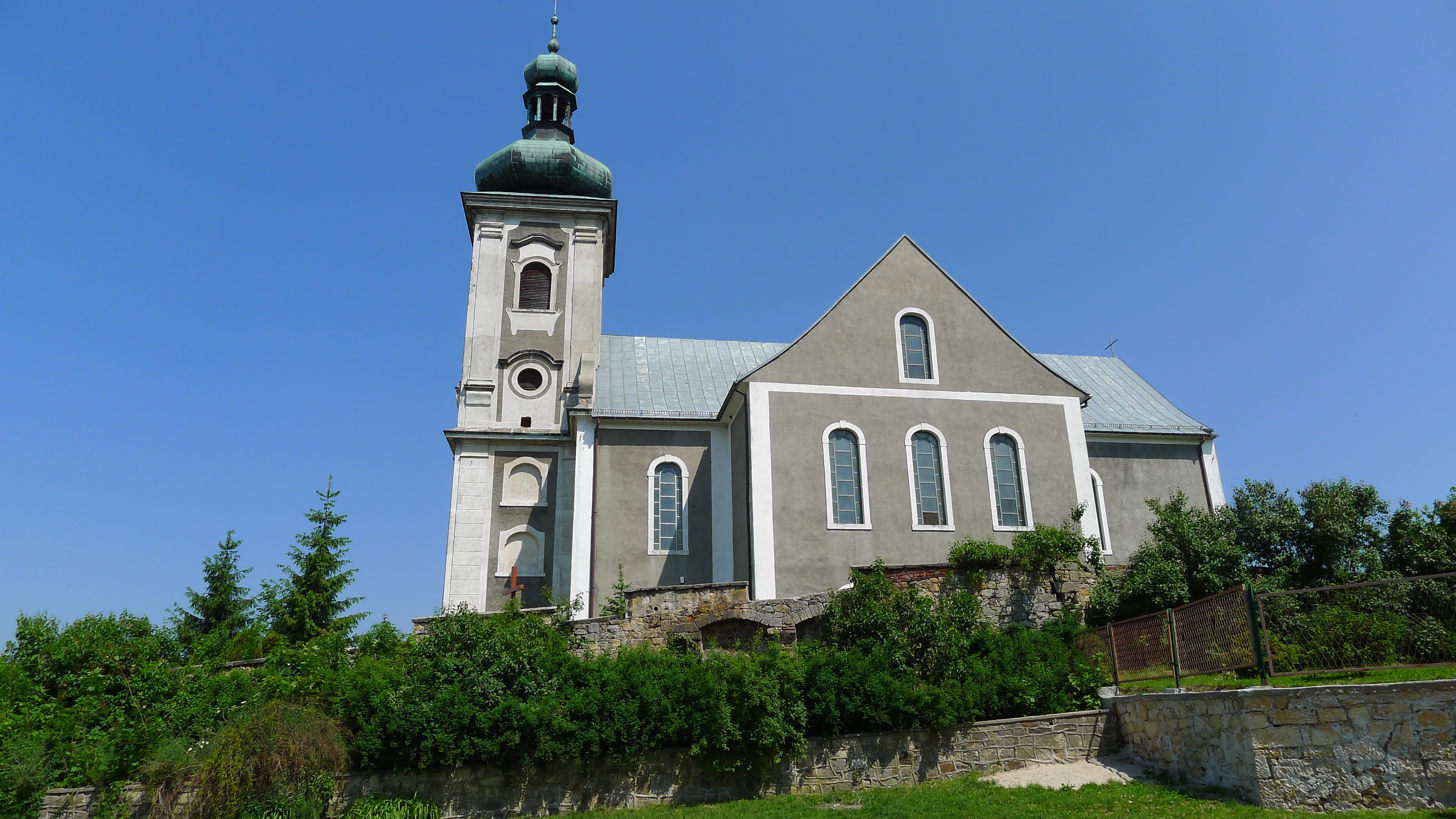

- Location within Poland
- Coordinates: 51°9′55″N 15°43′27″E
- Country: Poland
- Voivodeship: Lower Silesian
- County: Złotoryja
- Gmina: Pielgrzymka

Sędzimirów [sɛnd͡ʑiˈmiruf] is a village in the administrative district of Gmina Pielgrzymka, within Złotoryja County, Lower Silesian Voivodeship, in south-western Poland.
