= Wilhelm Lützow =

German swimmer (1892–1915)

Personal information
- Born: May 19, 1892 Frankfurt, German Empire
- Died: October 31, 1915 (aged 23) Sommepy-Tahure, France

Sport
- Sport: Swimming
Medal record
Representing Germany
Olympic Games
Silver medal – second place	1912 Stockholm	200 m breaststroke

Wilhelm Lützow
- Allegiance: German Empire
- Branch: Imperial German Army
- Service years: 1914–1916
- Conflicts: World War I

Wilhelm "Willy" Lützow (19 May 1892 – 31 October 1915) was a German breaststroke swimmer, who competed in the 1912 Summer Olympics. In the 200 metre breaststroke competition he won the silver medal next to his teammate Walter Bathe. In the 400 metre breaststroke event, he participated in the final but was not able to finish the race. He was killed in action during World War I.

== See also ==
- List of Olympians killed in World War I
