= Jack Howell (swimmer) =

American swimmer (1899–1967)

Personal information
- Full name: Jackson Zophar Howell
- National team: United States
- Born: January 29, 1899 San Francisco, California, U.S.
- Died: February 25, 1967 (aged 68) Los Angeles, California, U.S.
- Height: 6 ft 0 in (1.83 m)

Sport
- Sport: Swimming
- Strokes: Breaststroke
- Club: Oakland Athletic Club; Olympic Club

Jackson Zophar Howell (born January 29, 1899 – February 25, 1967) was an American competition swimmer who represented the United States at the 1920 Summer Olympics in Antwerp, Belgium in the 200 and 400-meter breaststroke.

Howell was born January 29 in San Francisco, California. He trained and competed for the Oakland Athletic Club, and also competed in Water Polo for the Oakland Club, frequently playing forward to utilize his speed and strength. On June 20, 1920, prior to the Olympics, he won the Pacific Association 500-yard championship in 7:06.8 competing for the Oakland Athletic Club. In a close and exciting finish, Howell edged out well-known swimmer Charlie O'Brien of the Olympic Club who placed second by only six inches.

== 1920 Antwerp Olympics ==
At the 1920 Olympics, Howell competed in both the men's 200-meter breaststroke and the men's 400-meter breaststroke, and finished in fourth place in both events.

In the 200-meter breast, his time was 3:10.8 in the semi-finals, placing him only about 1.4 seconds from the bronze medal winner from Finland. Swedish swimmers took both the gold and silver medals, with Hakan Malmot taking the gold in 3:04.4, finishing with nearly a five-second lead. German swimmer Walter Bathe, who had set the record for the event in 1912 was not invited, and British swimmer Percy Courtman, a top competitor in 1914, also did not attend, making the field more open to top competitors.

In the 400-meter breaststroke, Howell swam a 6:51.0 in Olympic competition in the final heat, placing him three seconds out of bronze medal contention. His time was set in the four lane finals of the event. Hakan Malmot won the event by a comfortable and commanding 14 seconds, though the event was never again swam in the Olympics. Sweden took the silver and Finland took the bronze.

=== Life after the Olympics ===
Swimming for the Olympic Club in 1922, where he continued to compete after his 1920 Olympic participation, Howell recorded Pacific Association records of 3:07.4 for the 220 yard breaststroke, and a 7:02 for the 440-yard breaststroke.

Howell later worked for a finance company managing credit. He died on February 25, 1967, in Los Angeles.
