= William Robinson (swimmer) =

British swimmer

Personal information
- Full name: William Walker Robinson
- National team: Great Britain
- Born: 23 June 1870 Airdrie, Scotland
- Died: 4 July 1940 (aged 70) Liverpool, England
- Height: 6 ft 0 in (1.83 m)
- Weight: 168 lb (76 kg)

Sport
- Sport: Swimming
- Strokes: Breaststroke
Medal record
Men's swimming
Representing Great Britain
Olympic Games
| Silver medal – second place | 1908 London | 200 m breaststroke |

William Walker Robinson (23 June 1870 – 4 July 1940) was a Scottish-born competition swimmer who represented Great Britain at the 1908 Summer Olympics in London. Robinson swam in the men's 200-metre breaststroke, and came second for the silver medal with a time of 3:12.8. He was 38 years old at the time of the 1908 Olympics, and was the oldest swimmer to win a medal in Olympic history for 100 years, until the 41-year-old American Dara Torres won three silver medals at the 2008 Olympics.

== See also ==
- List of Olympic medalists in swimming (men)
