= Lucien Lebaillif =

French swimmer

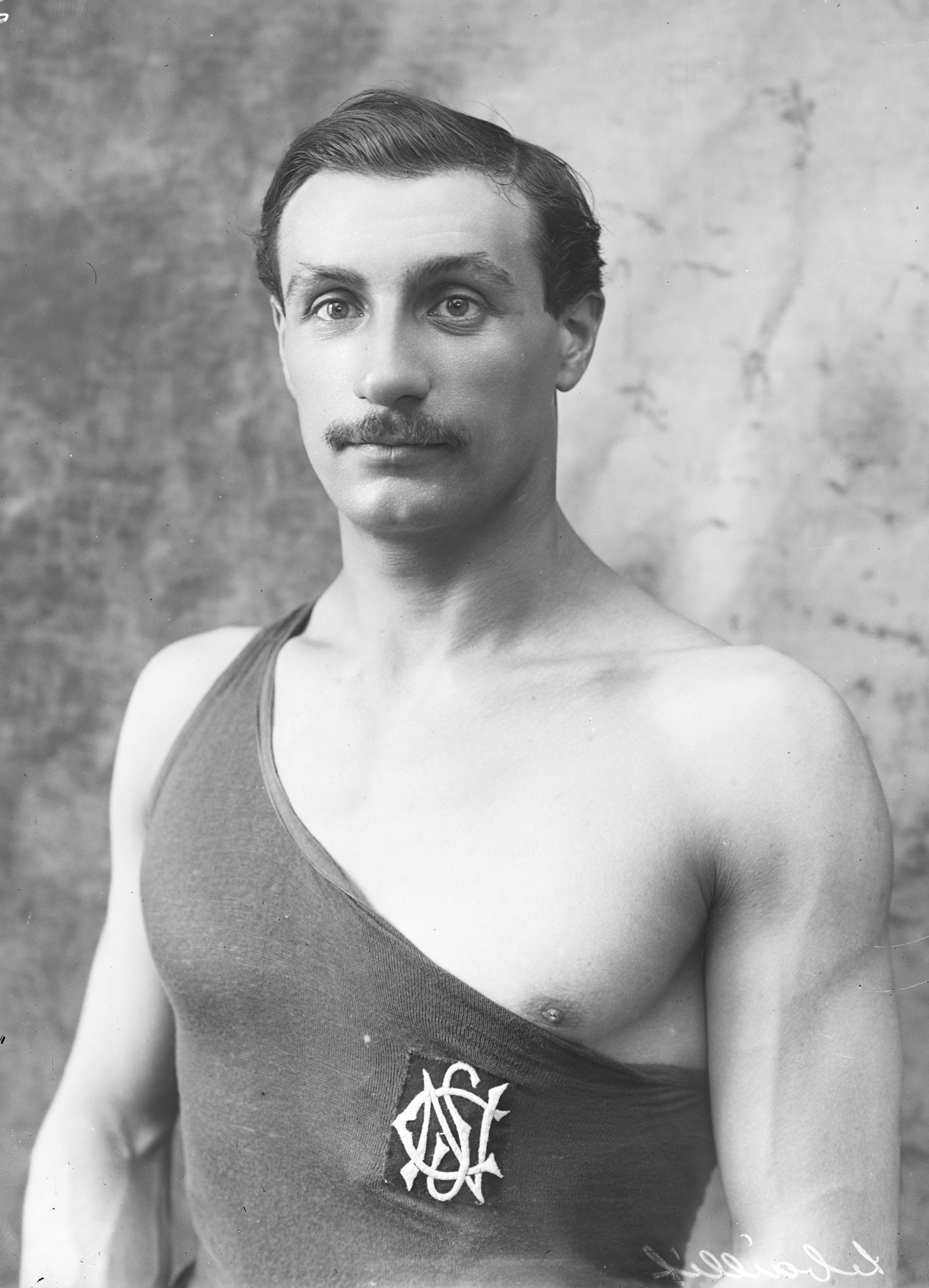

Personal information
- Full name: Lucien Lebaillif
- Nationality: French
- Born: March 7, 1892 Coulanges-la-Vineuse, France
- Died: February 8, 1977 (aged 84) Antibes, France

Sport
- Sport: Swimming

Lucien Lebaillif (March 7, 1892 – February 8, 1977) was a French swimmer. He competed in the men's 200 metre breaststroke and men's 400 metre breaststroke events at the 1920 Summer Olympics.
