= Pielgrzymka, Lower Silesian Voivodeship =

Pielgrzymka
- Village
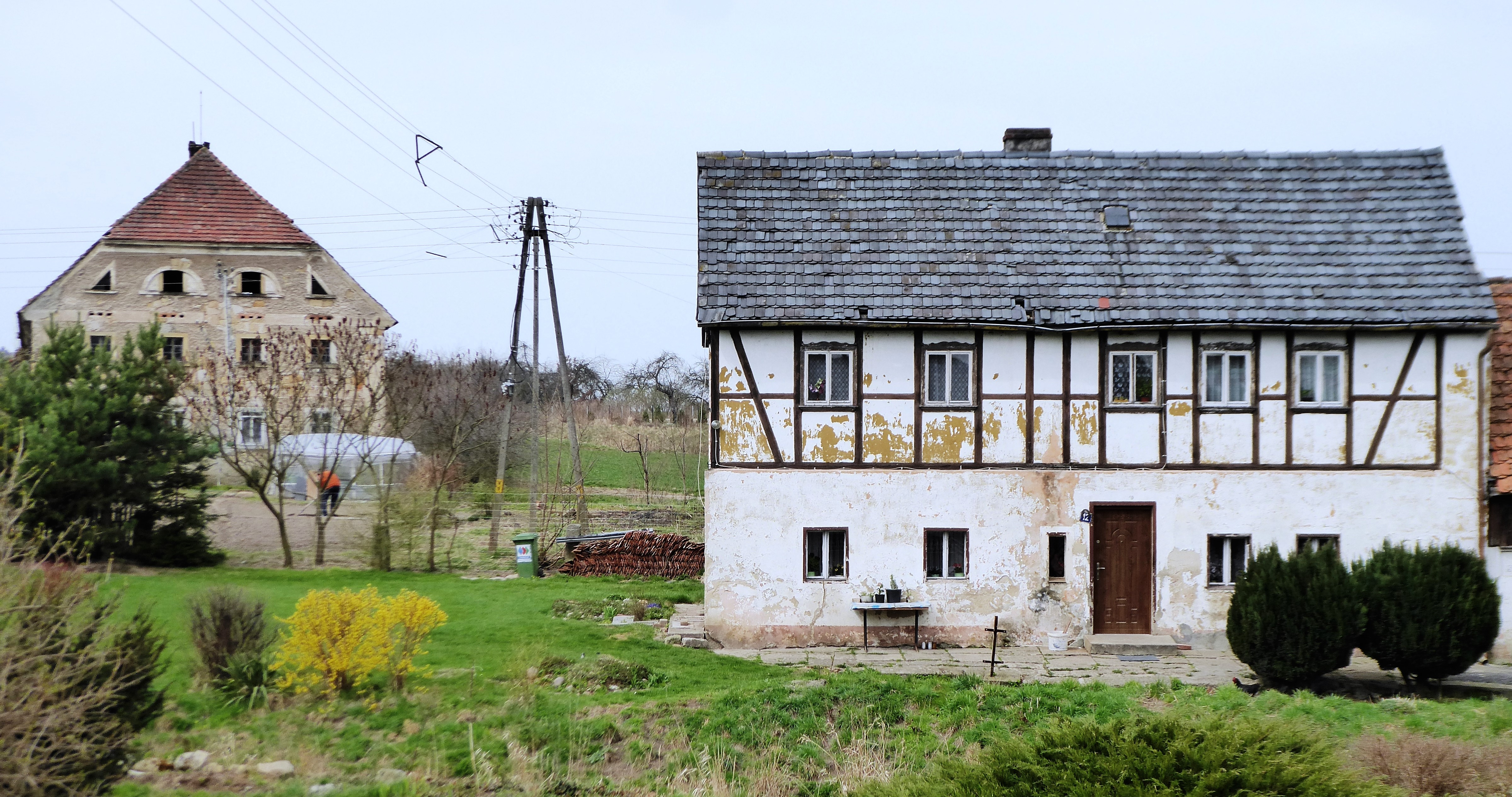

- Location within Poland
- Coordinates: 51°07′11″N 15°48′55″E
- Country: Poland
- Voivodeship: Lower Silesian
- County: Złotoryja
- Gmina: Pielgrzymka
- Population: 910

Pielgrzymka [pjɛlˈɡʐɨmka] is a village in Złotoryja County, Lower Silesian Voivodeship, in south-western Poland. It is the seat of the administrative district (gmina) called Gmina Pielgrzymka.
