= Wojcieszyn, Lower Silesian Voivodeship =

Wojcieszyn
- Village
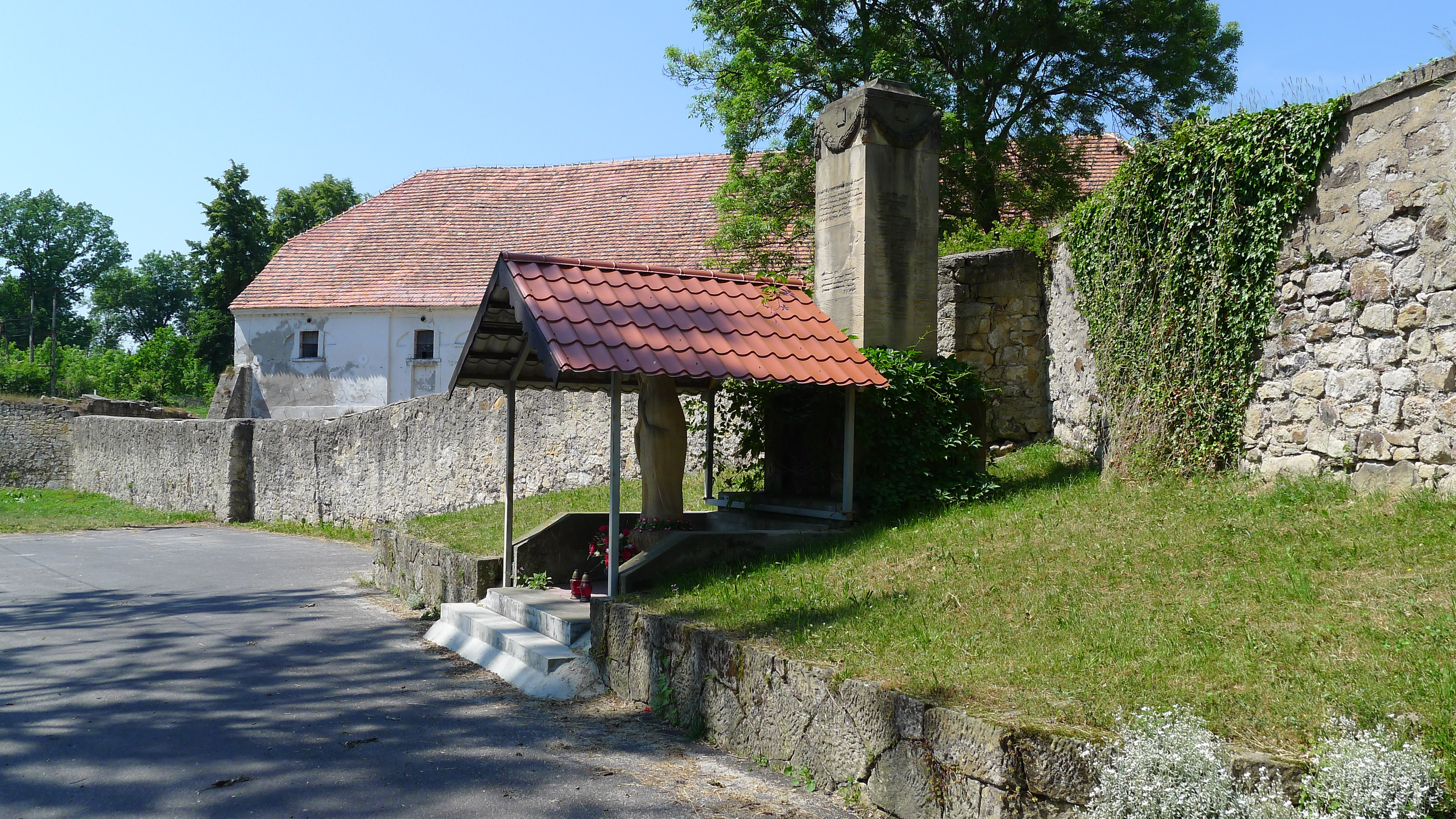

- Location within Poland
- Coordinates: 51°8′N 15°50′E
- Country: Poland
- Voivodeship: Lower Silesian
- County: Złotoryja
- Gmina: Pielgrzymka

Wojcieszyn (Polish pronunciation: [vɔjˈt͡ɕɛʂɨn]) is a village in the administrative district of Gmina Pielgrzymka, within Złotoryja County, Lower Silesian Voivodeship, in south-western Poland.
