= Charles Quinby =

American swimmer (1899–1988)

- Quinby, around age 21, likely taken circa early 1920's as a Midshipman at the U.S. Naval Academy

Personal information
- Full name: Charles Fenton Mercer Spotswood Quinby
- National team: United States
- Born: October 6, 1899 Norfolk, Virginia, U.S.
- Died: January 4, 1988 (aged 88) Englewood, Florida, U.S.
- Occupation: Naval Officer
- Spouses: Edna Marie Isted; Matilda

Sport
- Sport: Swimming
- Event: 400 meter breast (Olympics)
- Strokes: Breaststroke
- College team: U.S. Naval Academy
- Coach: George Kistler ('20 Olympics)

Charles Fenton Mercer Spotswood Quinby (October 6, 1899 – January 4, 1988) was an American competition swimmer who competed for the U.S. Naval Academy, and represented the United States at the 1920 Summer Olympics in Antwerp, Belgium. At the Olympics, Quinby competed in the 400-meter breaststroke, but did not advance to the finals. Serving thirty-five years as an Officer with the Navy, he was a WWI and WWII Naval veteran, who commanded the USS Sitka in 1945, and served primarily in the roles of an instructor for officers, engineer and administrator. He held the rank of Captain when he retired in 1952.

Charles Fenton Mercer Quinby was born October 6, 1899 in Norfolk, Virginia to John Gardner Quinby and Lucy Page Spotswood. Charles's father John Quinby attended the US Naval Academy and rose to the rank of Captain.

== 1920 Antwerp Olympics ==
Quinby participated with the U.S. Swimming team at the 1920 Antwerp Olympics, where he competed in the qualifying heats of the men's 400-meter breaststroke and was trained and managed by US Olympic Head Swimming Coach George Kistler. Kistler, an English born distance champion, served for thirty years as the swimming coach at the University of Pennsylvania. On August 23, 1920, Quinby finished fourth in his preliminary Olympic heat but did not advance, and his time was not recorded. Hakan Malmot of Sweden won the gold medal in the event with a time of 6:31.8 finishing comfortably ahead of the silver medalist. Sweden's Thor Henning won the Silver medal with a time of 6:45.2, and Finland's Arvo AAltonen took the bronze with a time of 6:48.0. The event was never again contested in the Olympics, as it was replaced by shorter distances for the breaststroke.

=== U.S. Naval Academy ===
A 1921 graduate, Quinby attended the United States Naval Academy in Annapolis, Maryland, where he lettered in swimming. His practices likely took place in early morning as was customary for Naval athletic teams.

Quinby married Edna Marie Isted in King, Washington on November 28, 1923. Edna died in 1967 in Kittery, Maine.

=== Naval service ===
Quniny was a thirty-five year veteran of the US Navy, serving in both WWI and WWII. He served as an Engineer and Instructor during his Naval Service. After graduating Annapolis, from 1921-1923 he served on the battleship USS Oklahoma, and the USS Cincinnati in 1924. He worked as a Naval Instructor at the University of Washington's Reserve Officer's Training department until around 1941-42. Initially serving in officer training in WWII, he was put in charge of the command of Southwest England's Naval Amphibious Bases, and from 1943-4 was in charge of the Naval Advance Base in Plymouth, England. At the end of WWII, he commanded the attack transport, USS Sitka, and later served with the First Naval District where he assisted the Chief of Staff beginning in 1946. In June, 1952 he retired from the Navy, living briefly in Kittery, Maine.

=== Honors ===
Among his highest Naval Honors, he was awarded the Croix de Guerre from France, and England's Legion of Merit. He was the recipient of an American Area Ribbon, and an Asiatic-Pacific Campaign Ribbon, as well as an American Defense Ribbon.

Quinby died at the age of 88 on January 4, 1988 in Englewood, Florida, and was buried in Arlington National Cemetery. He was survived by his second wife Matilda, grand-children and great-grandchildren. He first came to greater Sarasota, Florida in 1953 from Kittery Point, Maine. In his later years, he belonged to Englewood's St. David's Episcopal Church the Englewood Elks Lodge, and Myakka Pines Golf Club.

== See also ==
- List of United States Naval Academy alumni
