= Alf Davies (swimmer) =

British swimmer and water polo player

Personal information
- Nationality: British (English)
- Born: 1882 London, England
- Died: 14 July 1922 Kensington, London, England

Sport
- Sport: Swimming, Water polo
- Event: Breaststroke
- Club: Polytechnic SC

Alfred Davies (1882 – 14 July 1922) was an English swimmer and water polo player who specialised in the breaststroke and competed at the 1908 Summer Olympics.

== Biography ==
Davies was born in London, England and was a member of the Polytechnic Swimming Club. He played water polo for Polytechnic and Middlesex.

He finished runner-up in the Olympic trials at Kentish Town and White City, which gained selection for the Games as part of the Great Britain team in the 1908 Olympic Games in London, where he competed in the men's 200 metre breaststroke event.

In December 1908 on the Serpentine in Hyde Park, London, he won the 45th annual Christmas Day morning 100 yards race. In May 1909, he swam of scratch in the Dr. Denis Whittle 110 yards handicap race in the Serpentine.
