= Frederick Naylor =

British swimmer

Personal information
- Full name: Frederick Harold Naylor
- Born: 15 February 1881 Holloway, London
- Died: 16 November 1949 (aged 68) London Borough of Enfield

Sport
- Sport: Swimming

Frederick Harold Naylor (15 February 1881 – 16 November 1949) was a British swimmer, from Jersey. He competed in the men's 200 metre breaststroke event at the 1908 Summer Olympics.
