= Sydney Gooday =

British and Canadian swimmer

Personal information
- Full name: Sydney Howard Gooday
- National team: Great Britain; Canada
- Born: 4 September 1887 Croydon, England, UK
- Died: 18 July 1964 (aged 76) Ottawa, Ontario, Canada

Sport
- Sport: Swimming
- Strokes: Breaststroke
- Club: Thornton Heath Swimming Club

Sydney Howard Gooday (4 September 1887 – 18 July 1964) represented Great Britain at the 1908 Summer Olympics in London, swimming the men's 200-metre breaststroke. Gooday finished third in his first round heat and did not advance. By the time of the 1912 Summer Olympics in Stockholm, Gooday was residing in Canada. Decades after the Stockholm games, during newspaper coverage of the 1936 Summer Olympics in Berlin, Ottawa journalists stated that Gooday had been the first Ottawa resident to win an Olympic event. Allegedly, Gooday won the 100-metre breaststroke in 1912.

However, there is no confirmation of Gooday at the 1912 Olympics. In July 1912, the Ottawa Citizen newspaper included no mention of Gooday. Canadian George Hodgson was an Olympic swimming star in 1912. The journalists of 1936 were confused. Gooday made many trips from Europe to Canada, but none of those voyages coincided with a return from the 1912 Olympics. According to the various passenger lists, Sydney H. Gooday made repeated trips to Canada from England: August 1920 on board the Minnedosa; September 1920 on the Empress of Britain; August 1925 on the Alaunia; and June 1948 on the Ascania. The 1925 voyage included Gooday's wife Marion (age 34) and son Richard (age 6).

Gooday's September 1920 voyage was his return from the 1920 Summer Olympics in Antwerp, Belgium. This time Gooday represented Canada, swimming men's 400-metre breaststroke and men's 200-metre breaststroke. On 22 August 1920, Gooday failed to record a time in his 400-metre heat. On 26 August, Gooday finished fifth in his 200-metre heat, failing to advance.

Sydney Howard Gooday, son of Henry William and Mary Gooday, was baptised in the parish of Thornton Heath, Surrey, England, on 6 November 1887. Sydney was born 4 September 1887. According to the ship's passenger list for the Lake Champlain, Sydney Gooday, draughtsman, unmarried, arrived in Montreal, Canada, from Liverpool, England, 23 October 1911.

According to the Civil Service List of Canada, Gooday was first employed as a draughtsman with the Geographer's Branch of the Department of the Interior on 18 November 1912. According to the index material maintained by the archives of the Anglican Diocese of Ottawa, Sydney Howard Gooday married Marion Grant in St George's Anglican Church, Ottawa, in 1917. Their son, Richard Sydney Grant Gooday, was baptised at St George's in 1919.

In addition to his civil service career with the Department of the Interior, Gooday was a swimming instructor for the Ottawa YMCA in the 1930s and late 1920s. The YMCA symbol is included on his burial stone.

Sydney's wife Marion Jennie Gooday née Grant (1892–1955) died 29 May 1955 and was buried in Beechwood Cemetery, Ottawa.

Gooday died at his Ottawa home on 18 July 1964. According to the newspaper obituary, he was survived by his wife Joyce Sears, son Richard and brother Maurice. Gooday was interred in the Capital Memorial Gardens, Ottawa, Ontario.
