= Théodore Michel =

Luxembourgish swimmer

Personal information
- Full name: Théodore Michel

Sport
- Sport: Swimming

Théodore Michel was a Luxembourgish swimmer. He competed in the men's 200 metre breaststroke event at the 1920 Summer Olympics.
