= Per Fjästad =

Swedish swimmer

Personal information
- Born: 15 March 1883 Stockholm, Sweden
- Died: 18 October 1955 (aged 72) Mariefred, Sweden

Sport
- Sport: Swimming

Per Fjästad (15 March 1883 – 18 October 1955) was a Swedish swimmer. He competed in the men's 200 metre breaststroke event at the 1908 Summer Olympics.

Fjästad represented Stockholms KK.
