= Paul Neeckx =

Belgian swimmer

Personal information
- Full name: Paul Neeckx

Sport
- Sport: Swimming

Paul Neeckx was a Belgian swimmer. He competed in the men's 200 metre breaststroke event at the 1920 Summer Olympics.
