= Ernest Parker (swimmer) =

British swimmer

Personal information
- Born: 14 November 1895 Sheffield, England
- Died: 28 November 1965 (aged 70) Sheffield, England

Sport
- Sport: Swimming

Ernest Parker (14 November 1895 – 28 November 1965) was a British swimmer. He competed in the men's 200 metre breaststroke event at the 1920 Summer Olympics.
