= Sven Hanson (swimmer) =

Swedish swimmer

Personal information
- Born: 2 February 1892 Kristinehamn, Sweden
- Died: 22 June 1972 (aged 80) Västervik, Sweden

Sport
- Sport: Swimming
- Club: Stockholms KK

Sven Hanson (2 February 1892 – 22 June 1972) was a Swedish swimmer. He competed in the men's 200 metre breaststroke event at the 1912 Summer Olympics.

Hanson represented Stockholms KK.
