= Pontus Hanson =

Swedish swimmer (1884–1962)

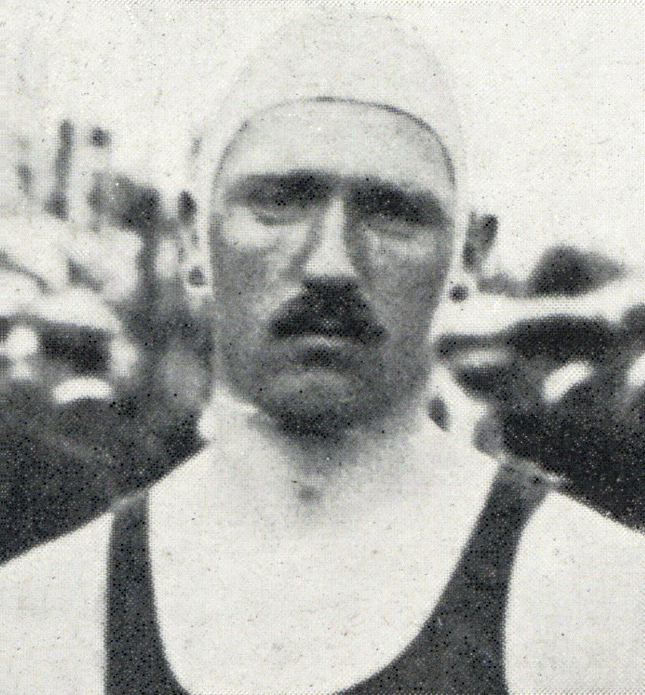

Personal information
- Born: 24 May 1884 Kristinehamn, Sweden
- Died: 4 December 1962 (aged 78) Stockholm, Sweden

Sport
- Sport: Swimming, water polo
- Club: Stockholms KK
Medal record
Representing Sweden
Swimming
Bronze medal – third place	1908 London	200 m breaststroke
Water polo
Silver medal – second place	1912 Stockholm	Team
Bronze medal – third place	1908 London	Team
Bronze medal – third place	1920 Antwerp	Team

Pontus Hanson (24 May 1884 – 4 December 1962) was a Swedish water polo player and swimmer, who won a bronze medal at the 1908 Summer Olympics in the 200 m breaststroke. In water polo he won bronze medals in 1908 and 1920 and a silver in 1912. His brother Sven competed in the 200 m breaststroke at the 1912 Olympics.

Hanson worked as a government official, and in parallel took active part in the development of swimming in Sweden, acting as a sports functionary in 1905–1922.

== See also ==
- Sweden men's Olympic water polo team records and statistics
- Dual sport and multi-sport Olympians
- List of Olympic medalists in swimming (men)
- List of Olympic medalists in water polo (men)
