= Twardocice =

- Village
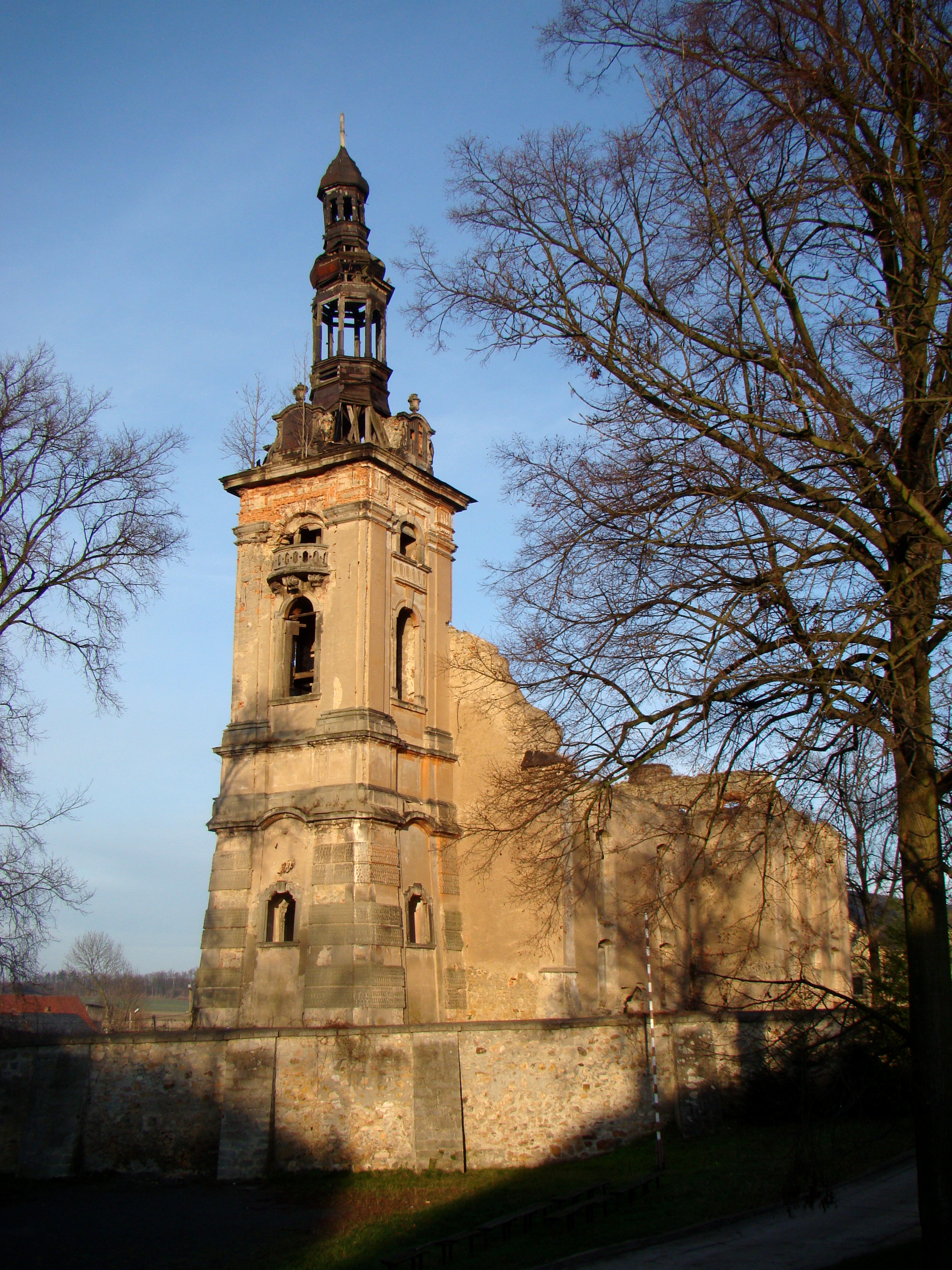
- Kościół w Twardocicach, listopad 2009

- Location within Poland
- Coordinates: 51°6′N 15°46′E
- Country: Poland
- Voivodeship: Lower Silesian
- County: Złotoryja
- Gmina: Pielgrzymka

Twardocice [tfardɔˈt͡ɕit͡sɛ], German Harpersdorf, is a village in the administrative district of Gmina Pielgrzymka, within Złotoryja County, Lower Silesian Voivodeship, in south-western Poland.

== History ==
From 1521 on Harpersdorf, since 1945 Twardocice, was part of the Habsburg province of Silesia, becoming a Prussian province in 1742, and a province in the German Empire from 1871 on.

Twardocice was mentioned for the first time in 1206. From the 16th to the early 18th century, it was the home of the Schwenkfelder religious sect, which opposed the dominant Lutheran local government. The Viehweg Monument, built in 1863 and rededicated after 2003 after restoration, commemorates Schwenkfelders who were buried in the cattle paths (a sign of disgrace) in the area and the surrounding villages.

In 1826, the last Silesian Schwenkfelder in Harpersdorf died, the farmer Melchior Dorn.

After the Second World War, the whole German-speaking and Lutheran population was expelled from the village and replaced by Catholic Poles.
