= Ern Parker =

Australian rules footballer

Personal information
- Full name: William Ernest Parker
- Born: 28 March 1922; Barkstead, Victoria
- Died: 3 December 1974 (aged 52); Bundaberg, Queensland
- Original team: Waubra
- Height: 191 cm (6 ft 3 in)
- Weight: 85 kg (187 lb)

Playing career^{1}
Years	Club	Games (Goals)
1947	South Melbourne	1 (0)
- ^{1} Playing statistics correct to the end of 1947.

William Ernest Parker (28 March 1922 – 3 December 1974) was an Australian rules footballer who played with South Melbourne in the Victorian Football League (VFL).

== War Service ==
Parker enlisted in the Australian Army in July 1941 as a 19 year old. He initially served in Malaya as a nursing orderly and in 1942 was declared as missing in action after the fall of Singapore. During his incarceration Parker worked on the Burma Railway and he survived to return to Australia in late 1945.
