= George Robertson (swimmer) =

British swimmer

Personal information
- Full name: George Robertson
- Born: 14 October 1900
- Died: 10 August 1976 (aged 75)

Sport
- Sport: Swimming

George Gladstone Robertson (14 October 1900 – 10 August 1976) was a British swimmer. He competed in three events at the 1920 Summer Olympics.
