= Percy Courtman =

British swimmer (1888–1917)

Personal information
- Full name: Percy Courtman
- National team: Great Britain
- Born: 14 May 1888 Chorlton-cum-Hardy, England
- Died: 2 June 1917 (aged 29) Neuville-Bourjonval, France

Sport
- Sport: Swimming
- Strokes: Breaststroke
- Club: Old Trafford SC
Medal record
Men's swimming
Representing Great Britain
Olympic Games
Bronze medal – third place	1912 Stockholm	400 m breaststroke

Percy Courtman (14 May 1888 – 2 June 1917) was an English breaststroke swimmer from Chorlton-cum-Hardy, Lancashire who competed for Great Britain in the 1908 Summer Olympics and 1912 Summer Olympics.

He was the son of James and his wife, Percy Ann Courtman, who, at the time of their son's death, lived at 261 Stretford Road, Manchester.

In the 1908 Olympics, he competed in the 200-metre breaststroke, but was second in his heat and did not advance. Four years later, he competed in the 400-metre breaststroke and won a bronze medal. He also competed in the 200 metre breaststroke and was fourth.

He died during World War I in France while serving as a private in the 1st/6th Battalion of the Manchester Regiment, and is buried at Neuville-Bourjonval British Cemetery, Pas-de-Calais.

== See also ==
- List of Olympians killed in World War I
- List of Olympic medalists in swimming (men)
- World record progression 200 metres breaststroke
