= Proboszczów =

- Village
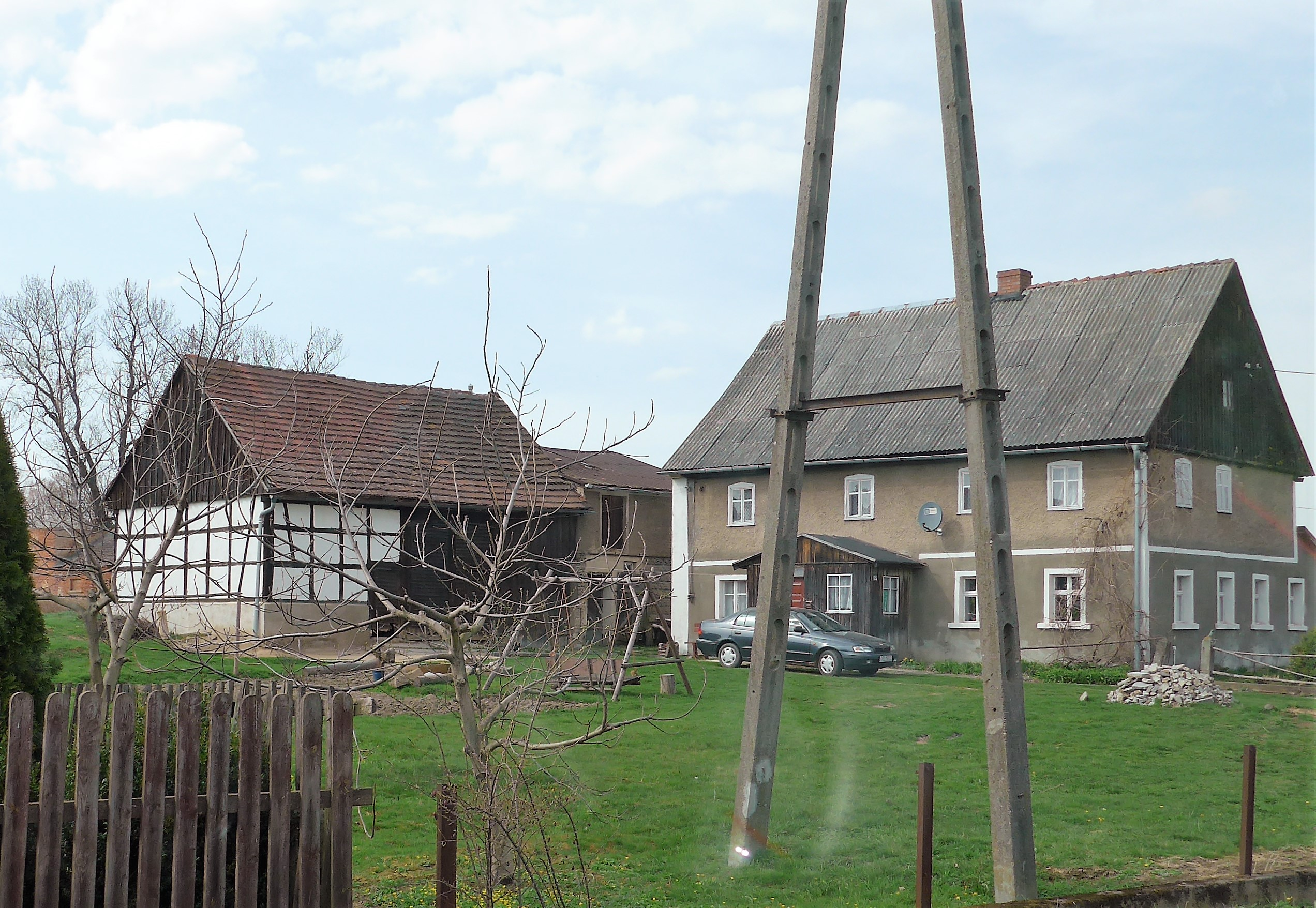

- Location within Poland
- Coordinates: 51°3′N 15°48′E
- Country: Poland
- Voivodeship: Lower Silesian
- County: Złotoryja
- Gmina: Pielgrzymka

Proboszczów [prɔˈbɔʂt͡ʂuf] is a village in the administrative district of Gmina Pielgrzymka, within Złotoryja County, Lower Silesian Voivodeship, in south-western Poland.
