= Rex Lassam =

British swimmer

Personal information
- Born: 13 July 1896 Stafford, England
- Died: 14 January 1983 (aged 86) Uckfield, England

Sport
- Sport: Swimming

Rex Lassam (13 July 1896 – 14 January 1983) was a British swimmer. He competed in two events at the 1920 Summer Olympics.
