= Luis Balcells =

Spanish swimmer

Personal information
- Born: 1903 Barcelona, Spain
- Died: 31 May 1927 (aged 23–24) Barcelona, Spain

Sport
- Sport: Swimming

Luis Balcells (1903 – 31 May 1927) was a Spanish breaststroke swimmer. He competed in two events at the 1920 Summer Olympics.
