= Håkan Malmrot =

Swedish swimmer

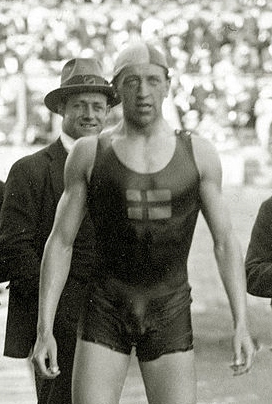
- Håkan Malmrot at the 1920 Olympics

Personal information
- Nationality: Swedish
- Born: 29 November 1900 Örebro, Sweden
- Died: 10 January 1987 (aged 86) Karlskrona, Sweden

Sport
- Country: Sweden
- Sport: Swimming
- Club: Örebro SS
Medal record
Representing Sweden
Olympic Games
Gold medal – first place	1920 Antwerp	200 m breaststroke
Gold medal – first place	1920 Antwerp	400 m breaststroke

Håkan Malmrot (29 November 1900 – 10 January 1987) was a Swedish breaststroke swimmer. He won two gold medals at the 1920 Summer Olympics in Antwerp, in the 200 m and 400 m events, both times with Swedish Thor Henning as silver medalist. In 1980 Malmrot was inducted to the International Swimming Hall of Fame.

== See also ==
- List of members of the International Swimming Hall of Fame
