= Édouard Van Haelen =

Belgian swimmer

Personal information
- Full name: Édouard Van Haelen
- Born: 22 July 1895
- Died: 16 June 1936 (aged 40)

Sport
- Sport: Swimming

Édouard Van Haelen (22 July 1895 – 16 June 1936) was a Belgian breaststroke swimmer. He competed in two events at the 1920 Summer Olympics.
