= Émile Arbogast =

French swimmer (1901–1978)

Personal information
- Born: 23 March 1901 Wasselonne, France
- Died: 12 February 1978 (aged 76) Strasbourg, France

Sport
- Sport: Swimming

Émile Arbogast (23 March 1901 – 12 February 1978) was a French breaststroke swimmer. He competed in two events at the 1920 Summer Olympics.
