= Eduard Stibor =

Czech swimmer and water polo player

Personal information
- Full name: Eduard Stibor
- Born: 22 June 1900 Prague, Austria-Hungary

Sport
- Sport: Swimming

Eduard Stibor (born 22 June 1900, date of death unknown) was a Czech swimmer. He competed in two events and the water polo at the 1920 Summer Olympics.
