= Frederick Holman (swimmer) =

British swimmer

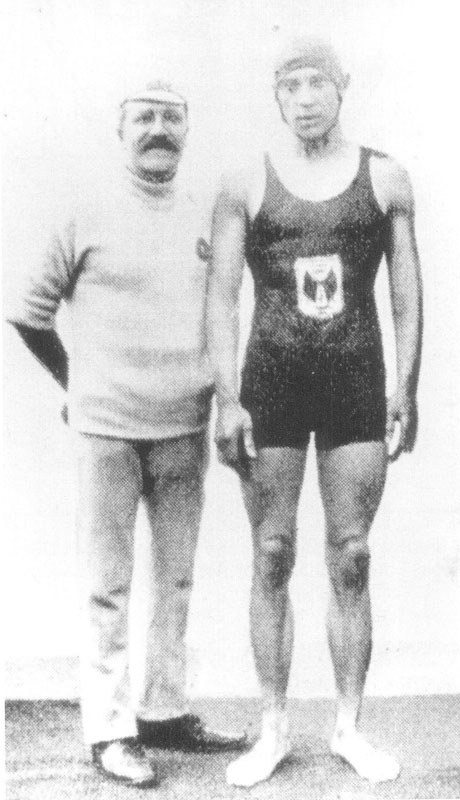
- Holman and coach

Personal information
- Full name: Frederick Holman
- National team: Great Britain
- Born: 9 February 1883 Dawlish, England
- Died: 23 January 1913 (aged 29) Exeter, England
- Height: 1.78 m (5 ft 10 in)
- Weight: 71 kg (157 lb; 11.2 st)

Sport
- Sport: Swimming
- Strokes: Breaststroke
- Club: Dawlish Swimming Club
Medal record
Men's swimming
Representing Great Britain
Olympic Games
Gold medal – first place	1908 London	200 m breaststroke

Frederick Holman (9 February 1883 – 23 January 1913) was an English competitive swimmer from Dawlish, Devon, England. Holman represented Great Britain at the 1908 Summer Olympics in London, where he won the gold medal in the men's 200-metre breaststroke event and did not compete in any other events.

He died of typhoid fever in Exeter in January 1913, aged 29. He was married but had no children. Holman is an "Honor Swimmer" member of the International Swimming Hall of Fame.

== See also ==
- List of members of the International Swimming Hall of Fame
- List of Olympic medalists in swimming (men)
- World record progression 200 metres breaststroke
