= Oszkár Demján =

Hungarian swimmer

Personal information
- Born: 28 December 1891 Budapest, Austria-Hungary
- Died: 4 September 1914 (aged 22) Sianky

Sport
- Sport: Swimming

Oszkár Demján (28 December 1891 – 4 September 1914) was a Hungarian breaststroke swimmer who competed in the 1912 Summer Olympics. In 1912, he was eliminated in the semi-finals of the 200 metre breaststroke event. In the 400 metre breaststroke competition, he was disqualified because he touched the wall with only one hand at the second turn.

He was born in Budapest and killed in action in Sianky during World War I.

== See also ==
- List of Olympians killed in World War I
