= Walter Bathe =

German swimmer

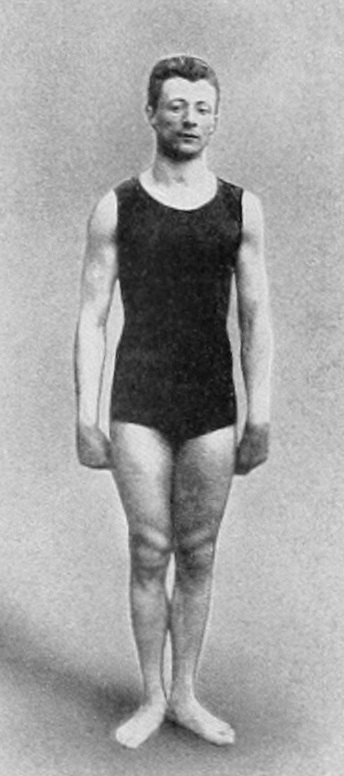
- Walter Bathe at the 1912 Olympics

Personal information
- Born: 1 December 1892 Probsthain, German Empire
- Died: 18 September 1959 (aged 66) Cesenatico, Italy

Sport
- Sport: Swimming
- Club: ASV Breslau
Medal record
Representing Germany
Olympic Games
Gold medal – first place	1912 Stockholm	200 m breaststroke
Gold medal – first place	1912 Stockholm	400 m breaststroke

Walter Bathe (1 December 1892 – 18 September 1959) was a German breaststroke swimmer. He won gold medals in the 200 m and 400 m breaststroke at the 1912 Summer Olympics, setting Olympic records that lasted until 1924. In 1970 he was inducted to the International Swimming Hall of Fame.

Bathe took swimming at age 8 to improve poor health and, at 19, won two Olympic medals. He continued swimming until about 1930, winning six national breaststroke championships, 5 Crown Prince Trophies, and 3 River Oder swims (7.5 km). In 1910, he set two world records in the 100 m breaststroke, at 1:18.4 and 1:17.5.

== See also ==
- List of members of the International Swimming Hall of Fame
