= Félicien Courbet =

Belgian water polo player

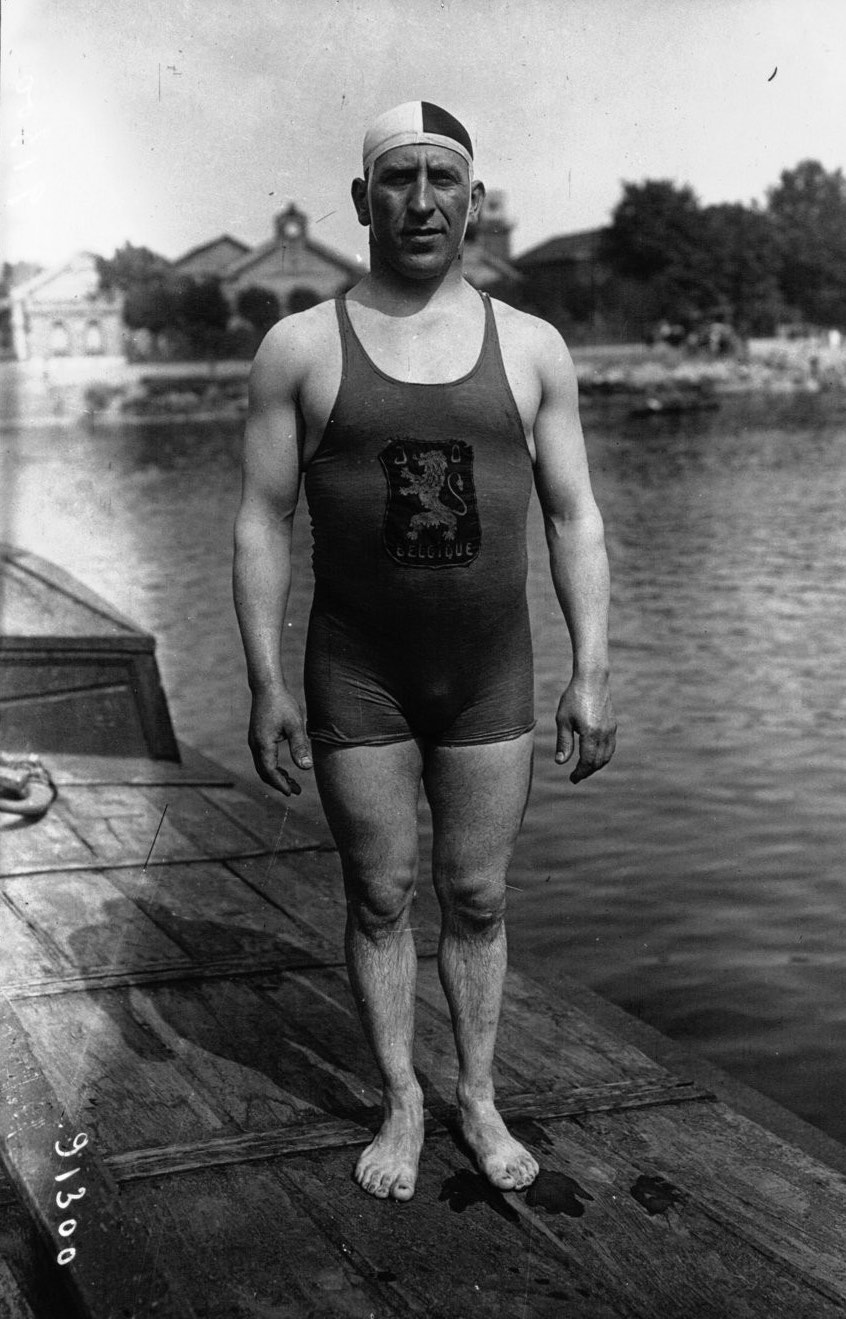
- Félicien Courbet in 1921

Personal information
- Born: 25 February 1888 Ixelles, Belgium
- Died: 20 December 1967 (aged 79) Ixelles, Belgium

Sport
- Sport: Swimming
- Strokes: Breaststroke
Medal record
Representing Belgium
Men's water polo
Olympic Games
Bronze medal – third place	1912 Stockholm	Team competition

Félicien Courbet (25 February 1888 – 20 December 1967) was a Belgian water polo player and breaststroke swimmer who competed in the 1908 Summer Olympics, in the 1912 Summer Olympics, and in the 1920 Summer Olympics. He was part of the Belgian water polo team in 1912, which won a bronze medal. In 1908, 1912 and 1920 he also participated in all breaststroke events, but without being able to take part in a final.

== See also ==
- List of Olympic medalists in water polo (men)
- World record progression 200 metres breaststroke
