= Deaths in October 1988 =

The following is a list of notable deaths in October 1988.

Entries for each day are listed alphabetically by surname. A typical entry lists information in the following sequence:

- Name, age, country of citizenship at birth, subsequent country of citizenship (if applicable), reason for notability, cause of death (if known), and reference.

== October 1988 ==
=== 1 ===
- Lucien Ballard, 80, American cinematographer (The Caretakers), car accident.
- Victor Coverley-Price, 87, British painter.
- Trevor Herion, 29, Irish singer and songwriter, suicide.
- Sacheverell Sitwell, 90, English writer.
- Pavle Vuisić, 62, Serbian actor (Kamiondžije).
- Jim Young, 66, Australian rules footballer.

=== 2 ===
- Robert Blucke, 91, British RAF officer.
- Hamengkubuwono IX, 76, Indonesian politician and Javanese Royal, Vice President of Indonesia, internal bleeding.
- Peter Hunt, 72, British Army general, Chief of the General Staff.
- Sir Alec Issigonis, 81, Ottoman-born British automotive designer (Mini).
- Thomas J. Kelly, 65, American soldier in the U.S. Army, Medal of Honor recipient, heart attack.
- Jean Moulin, 83, Luxembourgian Olympic sprinter (1928).
- Generoso Pope Jr., 61, American media mogul (National Enquirer), heart attack.
- Florence E. Wall, 95, American cosmetic chemist.

=== 3 ===
- Mae Brussell, 66, American radio personality, challenger of the Warren Commission report, cancer.
- Richard Evelyn Byrd III, 68, American officer in US Navy, Antarctic explorer, malnutrition & dehydration. (body found this date)
- Clarence Carnes, 61, American murderer (Battle of Alcatraz), AIDS.
- Marco Galli, 31, Italian Olympic water polo player (1984).
- Ma Haide, 78, American doctor who practiced medicine in China, cancer and diabetes.
- Ruth Hale Oliver, 78, American astrologer and actress.
- Franz Josef Strauss, 73, German politician, Minister-President of Bavaria, heart failure.

=== 4 ===
- William Melville Alexander, 90, Canadian WWI flying ace.
- Carlo Carretto, 78, Italian writer and Catholic priest, member of the Little Brothers of the Gospel.
- Zlatko Grgić, 57, Croatian-born Canadian animator (Dream Doll).
- Geoffrey Household, 87, British novelist specialising in thrillers (Rogue Male).
- Margaret Lacey, 76, British actress and ballet teacher (Diamonds Are Forever).
- Thérèse Leduc, 54, French Olympic alpine skier (1960).

=== 5 ===
- Art Gagne, 90, Canadian NHL player (Montreal Canadiens, Boston Bruins).
- Curt Hjelm, 74, Swedish footballer (Sleipner).
- Dermie O'Connell, 60, American NBA player (Boston Celtics, St. Louis Bombers).
- Ron Staniforth, 64, English international footballer (Stockport County, England).
- Lois W., (Lois Wilson), 97, American co-founder of Al-Anon for alcoholics.

=== 6 ===
- Severiano Briseño, 86, Mexican composer.
- Dean Burk, 84, American biochemist and cancer researcher (Lineweaver–Burk plot), cancer.
- Paul Ledoux, 74, Belgian astrophysicist.
- Don Terry, 86, American actor (Don Winslow of the Navy, Don Winslow of the Coast Guard).

=== 7 ===
- George Ansell, 78, English footballer (Norwich City).
- Sándor Bíró, 77, Hungarian international footballer (MTK Budapest, Hungary).
- Billy Daniels, 73, American singer ("That Old Black Magic"), stomach cancer.
- Christian Herbert, 84, British barrister and peer, Governor of British Guiana.
- Stéphane Lupasco, 88, Romanian philosopher, developed non-Aristotelian logic.
- Ivan More, 91, Australian rules footballer.
- Karl Pedersen, 86, Norwegian Olympic wrestler (1928).
- Chet Phillips, 74, American Olympic gymnast (1936).

=== 8 ===
- Charles Beauclerk, 73, British soldier and hereditary peer, Duke of St Albans.
- Bob Boken, 80, American baseball player (Washington Senators, Chicago White Sox).
- Harold Dorman, 61, American rock and roll singer and songwriter ("Mountain of Love").
- Boob Fowler, 87, American Major League baseball player (Cincinnati Reds).
- Edward George Warris Hulton, 81, British magazine publisher and writer.
- Hans Kuhn, 89, German philologist, specialised in Germanic studies.
- Wally Lemm, 68, American NFL football coach (Houston Oilers, St. Louis Cardinals).
- Ernst Hermann Meyer, 82, German composer and musicologist.
- Reino Nori, 75, American NFL player (Brooklyn Dodgers, Chicago Bears).
- Sam Richardson, 70, Canadian Olympic athlete (1936).
- Fred Shepherd, 65, American Negro Leagues baseball player.
- Pál Titkos, 80, Hungarian international footballer (MTK Hungária, Hungary).

=== 9 ===
- Mousey Alexander, 66, American jazz drummer, heart and kidney failure.
- Edward Chodorov, 84, American playwright, film writer and producer.
- Cliff Gallup, 58, American guitarist, heart attack.
- Bob Goslin, 61, New Zealand Olympic boxer (1948).
- Jackie Milburn, 64, English international footballer (Newcastle United, England), lung cancer.
- Felix Wankel, 86, German mechanical engineer, Hitler Youth leader and anti-Semite, inventor of the Wankel rotary engine.

=== 10 ===
- Samuel A. Adams, 54, American analyst for the Central Intelligence Agency, heart attack.
- Gösta Bergström, 85, Swedish Olympic long distance runner (1924).
- Bhabani Bhattacharya, 81, Indian writer.
- David Croudip, 30, American NFL footballer (Atlanta Falcons), car crash.
- John Daly, 70, Irish rugby league and union player.
- Juan Pujol García, 76, Spanish spy and double agent.
- Kurt Marshall, 22, American gay model and actor, AIDS.
- Montgomery Tully, 84, Irish film director and writer.

=== 11 ===
- Buck Clarke, 55, American jazz percussionist.
- Thaddeus J. Dulski, 73, American politician, member of the U.S. House of Representatives (1959-1974), leukemia.
- Morgan Farley, 90, American film and television actor.
- Wayland Flowers, 48, American actor, comedian and puppeteer (Captain Kangaroo), AIDS.
- Bonita Granville, 65, American actress and producer (Nancy Drew, These Three), lung cancer.
- Robert Edward Gross, 83, American surgeon and a medical researcher.
- Roy Herrick, 52, British actor.
- Max Imdahl, 63, German art historian.
- Guido Monzino, 60, Italian mountain climber and explorer, led first Italian expedition to climb Mount Everest, heart failure.
- Ursula Nordstrom, 78, American publisher and editor of children's books, ovarian cancer.
- Joel Oppenheimer, 58, American poet, columnist in The Village Voice, lung cancer.
- Red Owens, 63, American NBA player (Anderson Packers, Tri-Cities Blackhawks/Milwaukee Hawks).
- Hugh Percy, 74, British soldier and peer, Duke of Northumberland, heart attack.
- Giuseppe Tonucci, 50, Italian Olympic cyclist (1960).

=== 12 ===
- Ruth Manning-Sanders, 102, Welsh-born English poet and author.
- Ken Murray, 85, American comedian, actor and author (Bill and Coo, The Man Who Shot Liberty Valance).
- Rafael García Serrano, 71, Spanish writer and journalist.
- Coby Whitmore, 75, American painter and magazine illustrator (The Saturday Evening Post).

=== 13 ===
- Norman Barry, 90, American judge, politician and football coach (Chicago Cardinals), heart attack.
- Reggie Bell, 84, British Olympic middle-distance runner (1928).
- Oscar Dose, 87, Swedish Olympic diver (1920).
- Melvin Frank, 75, American screenwriter and producer (A Touch of Class, White Christmas), complications from heart surgery.
- Irene Hunt, 96, American silent-screen actress.
- Ramón Romero, 29, Dominican-born American MLB player (Cleveland Indians).
- Mike Venezia, 43, American thoroughbred horse racing jockey, horse racing accident.

=== 14 ===
- Serafín Aedo, 79, Spanish international footballer.
- Kathleen Blackshear, 91, American artist.
- Charles Augustus, 76, German prince, head of the house of Saxe-Weimar-Eisenach.
- Jesús Dermit, 79, Spanish racing cyclist.
- Abie Hood, 85, American MLB player (Boston Braves).
- Katriel Katz, 79, Israeli diplomat, ambassador to the Soviet Union and Poland.
- Mary Morris, 72, Fijian-born British actress, heart failure.
- Vic Raschi, 69, American Major League baseball player (New York Yankees), heart attack.
- René Vietto, 74, French road racing cyclist.
- John White, 53, American AFL player (Houston Oilers, Oakland Raiders).

=== 15 ===
- John Ball, 77, American mystery novel writer (In the Heat of the Night), colon cancer.
- Victor Copps, 69, Canadian politician, mayor of Hamilton, Ontario.
- James Craig, 46, Northern Irish loyalist paramilitary, shot.
- Piero Fornasetti, 74, Italian artist and designer, died during minor operation.
- Khudu Mammadov, 60, Azerbaijani geologist (crystal chemistry).
- Rallou Manou, 72–73, Greek choreographer.
- Kaikhosru Shapurji Sorabji, 96, English composer, pianist and writer (Gulistan).
- François Winnepenninckx, 69, Belgian footballer.

=== 16 ===
- William A. Earle, 68–69, American philosopher.
- Queen Farida of Egypt, 67, Egyptian consort of King Farouk, leukemia.
- Abdulrahman Fawzi, 78, Egyptian international footballer and manager (Zamalek, Egypt).
- Christian Matras, 87, Faroese poet.
- Alan Reid, 61, Australian rules footballer.
- Muzafer Sherif, 82, Ottoman-born American social psychologist, heart attack.
- Edward Wright, 76, English painter.

=== 17 ===
- Oved Ben-Ami, 83, Israeli politician, co-founder of the cities of Netanya and Ashdod.
- William Henry Bramble, 87, British union leader and Chief Minister of Montserrat.
- John Dillon, 67, British Olympic sailor (1952, 1956).
- Adélaïde Hautval, 82, French physician, provided medical care in Auschwitz concentration camp, suicide.
- Anthony A. Hoekema, 74–75, Dutch-born American Calvinist minister, heart attack.
- György Horváth, 44, Hungarian Olympic weightlifter (1972).
- William Norris, 80, New Zealand cricketer.
- Alec Peterson, 80, British teacher, instrumental in introducing the International Baccalaureate.

=== 18 ===
- Michael ffolkes, 63, British illustrator and cartoonist (The Daily Telegraph, Punch), pancreas and liver disease.
- Kamel Hana Gegeo, Iraqi bodyguard, food taster for Saddam Hussein, murdered.
- Čestmír Kalina, 66, Czech Olympic shot putter (1948).
- Aasmund Kulien, 95, Norwegian politician.
- Caswell Silver, 72, American geologist, president of Sundance Oil Company, heart attack.
- Toni Stolper, 97, Austrian-German economist and journalist.

=== 19 ===
- Labdhi Bhandari, 40, Indian professor of marketing at the Indian Institute of Management, Ahmedabad, plane crash.
- Tom Boast, 82, Australian Olympic swimmer (1928).
- Bill Burgo, 68, American MLB player (Philadelphia Athletics).
- Henry W. Buse Jr., 76, American general in the U.S. Marine Corps.
- Lawrence W. Butler, 80, American special effects artist, inventor of bluescreening process (The Thief of Bagdad), heart attack.
- William Joseph Campbell, 83, American judge (U.S. District Court for the Northern District of Illinois).
- Fathead, 27–28, Jamaican-born American dancehall deejay, murdered.
- Þórður Guðmundsson, 80, Icelandic Olympic water polo player (1936).
- Son House, 86, American singer and guitarist, cancer of the larynx.
- Wolfgang Kummer, 74, German Olympic bobsledder (1936).
- Helen O'Bannon, 49, American economist, Secretary of Public Welfare for Pennsylvania, cancer.
- Frederick Pitts, 89, American Olympic modern pentathlete (1924).
- Sten Suvio, 76, Finnish boxer and Olympic gold medalist (1936).
- Friedrich Weinreb, 77, Dutch economist, World War II swindler.

=== 20 ===
- Mark Evans Austad, 71, American radio and television commentator, ambassador to Finland and Norway, heart disease.
- Ulrich Beyer, 41, German Olympic boxer (1972, 1976).
- Marion William Isbell, 83, American restaurateur, founder of Ramada Inns.
- Juan Salcedo Jr., 84, Filipino physician and scientist (Secretary of Health).
- Sheila Scott, 66, English aviator, cancer.
- Mogens Wöldike, 91, Danish conductor (Swedish Radio Symphony Orchestra).

=== 21 ===
- Guido Beck, 85, Argentinian physicist, car accident.
- Reggie Otero, 73, Cuban Major League baseball player (Chicago Cubs), heart attack.
- Nyari Welly, 43, Indian politician (Arunachal Pradesh Legislative Assembly).

=== 22 ===
- Henry Armstrong, 75, American boxer, multiple world champion, heart failure.
- Cynthia Freeman (Bea Feinberg), 73, American novelist (No Time For Tears), cancer.
- Plácido Galindo, 82, Peruvian international footballer (Universitario de Deportes, Peru).
- Clare Stevenson, 85, Australian director of the Women's Auxiliary Australian Air Force.
- Esat Oktay Yıldıran, 39, Turkish military officer, governor of Diyarbakır Prison, assassinated.

=== 23 ===
- Philippe Agut, 59, French racing cyclist.
- Hap Emms, 83, Canadian NHL ice hockey player, coach and team owner (Barrie Flyers), heart failure.
- Laurence Irving, 91, English book illustrator and Hollywood set designer.
- André Neher, 74, French Jewish scholar and philosopher.
- Asashio Tarō III, 58, Japanese sumo wrestler, stroke.

=== 24 ===
- William T. R. Fox, 76, American foreign policy professor (Columbia University), coined the term "superpower", heart disease.
- Samuel B. Fuller, 83, American entrepreneur, president of the National Negro Business League, kidney failure.
- Stanisław Hachorek, 61, Polish Olympic footballer (1960).
- Benny Joy, 52, American rockabilly guitarist and singer, cancer.
- Ratna Mohini, 84, Javanese dancer.
- Bill O'Brien, 83, Australian rules footballer.
- Valerie Taylor, 85, English actress (Berkeley Square).
- Connie Tudin, 71, Canadian NHL player (Montreal Canadiens).
- Sumner White, 58, American Olympic sailor (1952).

=== 25 ===
- Kathleen Baxter, 87, English women's rights activist (National Council of Women).
- Bob Carey, 58, American NFL footballer (Los Angeles Rams).
- Boobie Clark, 38, American NFL footballer (Cincinnati Bengals), blood clot in lung.
- Eric Larson, 83, American animator for Walt Disney Studios (Winnie the Pooh).
- Luther Lassiter, 69, American pool player, seven-time world pocket billiard champion.
- Milton Rokeach, 69, Polish-born American social psychologist.
- Harold Leeming Sheehan, 88, British physician (Sheehan's syndrome).

=== 26 ===
- R. K. Baliga, 58, Indian engineer, founder of Electronics City, diabetes-related complications.
- Georgette Cohan, 88, American actress (Mr. Pim Passes By).
- Ruth Gervis, 94, British illustrator (Ballet Shoes).
- Johnny Hackenbruck, 73, American NFL player (Detroit Lions).
- Bill Johnson, 92, American Negro Leagues baseball player.
- Tatapuram Sukumaran, 65, Indian Malayalam writer.

=== 27 ===
- Gilbert Carson, 87, American college football and basketball coach (Eastern Illinois Panthers).
- Frank Devlin, 88, Irish badminton player.
- Charles Hawtrey, 73, English actor and comedian (Carry On), vascular disease.
- Curt Herzstark, 86, Austrian engineer.
- Rudolf Jordan, 86, Nazi German Gauleiter in Halle-Merseburg and Magdeburg-Anhalt.
- Jack Kane, 80, Australian politician, member of the Australian Senate.
- Ruhollah Khatami, 81, Iranian cleric.
- Michael Reisser, 42, Israeli politician, member of the Knesset (1981-1988).
- Kenneth Thorpe Rowe, 88, American professor of drama and playwriting.
- Ben Steiner, 67, American MLB player (Boston Red Sox, Detroit Tigers).

=== 28 ===
- Pietro Annigoni, 78, Italian artist and portrait painter (Queen Elizabeth II), kidney failure.
- John Backus, 77, American physicist and acoustician.
- Shoki Coe, 74, Taiwanese Presbyterian minister.
- Ted Larsen, 65, Australian rules footballer.
- Alva B. Lasswell, 83, American linguist and cryptanalyst in the U.S. Marine Corps.
- Jack de Manio, 74, British journalist and radio presenter (Today).
- James V. Mangano, 82, American politician, member of the New York State Assembly (1934-1937), cancer.
- Frank Schwable, 80, American general in the U.S. Marine Corps.
- Teikō Shiotani, 89, Japanese photographer.
- Harry Taylor, 87, English cricketer.
- Dave Tyriver, 50, American MLB player (Cleveland Indians).

=== 29 ===
- Kamaladevi Chattopadhyay, 85, Indian social reformer and freedom activist.
- Andy Cohen, 84, American Major League baseball player (New York Giants).
- Joe Comfort, 71, American jazz double bassist.
- Thomas Cooray, 86, Sri Lankan Roman Catholic cardinal, Archbishop of Colombo.
- Nataša Gollová, 76, Czech actress (Eva tropí hlouposti).
- Bill Mason, 58–59, Canadian author, filmmaker and conservationist, cancer.
- Orlando Montenegro Medrano, 68, Nicaraguan politician and attorney, acting President of Nicaragua.
- Robert Olejnik, 77, Nazi German flying ace.
- Ross Rocklynne, 75, American science fiction author (The Men and the Mirror), heart disease.

=== 30 ===
- Joseph Depew, 76, American television director, producer, and film actor.
- Ernst Fritz Fürbringer, 88, German film actor.
- T. Hee, 77, American animator and director (Walt Disney Animation Studios).
- Tasos Leivaditis, 66, Greek poet.
- John Myers Myers, 82, American writer (Silverlock).
- Florence Nagle, 94, British breeder of racehorses and pedigree dogs, horse trainer and feminist.
- Raúl Pellegrin, 30, Chilean guerrilla leader (Manuel Rodríguez Patriotic Front).
- Francisco Rodrigues, 63, Brazilian international footballer (Palmeiras, Fluminense, Brazil).
- Leo Sauvage, journalist, writer, and arts critic.
- Liz Whitney Tippett, 82, American socialite and breeder of thoroughbred racehorses, cancer.
- Bernie Walter, 80, American MLB player (Pittsburgh Pirates).

=== 31 ===
- Ladislau da Guia, 82, Brazilian footballer.
- Joe Henke, 85, Australian rules footballer.
- John Houseman, 86, Romanian-born American actor and producer (Citizen Kane, The Blue Dahlia), cancer.
- Ken Niles, 81, American radio announcer and film narrator (Out of the Past), heart failure.
- Alfred Pellan, 82, Canadian painter, leukemia.
- Vasco Ronchi, 90, Italian physicist (Ronchi test).
- Theodor Schneider, 77, German mathematician (Gelfond–Schneider theorem).
- George Uhlenbeck, 87, Dutch-American theoretical physicist (Ornstein-Uhlenbeck process).

=== Unknown date ===
- Mavis Freeman, 69, American Olympic swimmer (1936).
- Gerry Livingston, 73–74, Canadian businessman.
- Denis Martin, 67–68, Northern Irish singer, actor and theatre producer.
- Anant Sharma, 68, Indian Railway Union leader and politician, Minister of State for Industry.
