= Diving at the 1920 Summer Olympics – Men's 10 metre platform =

Men's 10 metre platform diving at the Games of the VII Olympiad
- Venue: Stade Nautique d'Antwerp
- Dates: 28–29 August
- Competitors: 14 or 15 from 6 or 7 nations

Medalists
1st place, gold medalist(s)		Clarence Pinkston	United States
2nd place, silver medalist(s)		Erik Adlerz	Sweden
3rd place, bronze medalist(s)		Harry Prieste	United States

The men's 10 metre platform was one of five diving events on the diving at the 1920 Summer Olympics programme. The competition was held on Sunday, 28 August 1920 (first round) and on Monday, 29 August 1920 (final).

Sources vary on whether Adolfo Wellisch competed, and thus whether 14 or 15 divers from 6 or 7 nations competed. The official report does not list him, but both de Wael and sports-reference include him, with the latter even giving a score.

== Results ==
=== First round ===
Sunday, 28 August 1920: The three divers who scored the smallest number of points in each group of the first round advanced to the final.

==== Group 1 ====
Rank	Diver	Nation	Points	Score	Notes
1	Yngve Johnson	Sweden	7	445.80	Q
2	Clarence Pinkston	United States	10	443.00	Q
3	Louis Balbach	United States	17	409.15	Q
4	Gunnar Ekstrand	Sweden	20	402.80	
5	Paul Køhler	Denmark	23	387.40	
6	Richard Flint	Canada	28	351.35	

==== Group 2 ====
Rank	Diver	Nation	Points	Score	Notes
1	Erik Adlerz	Sweden	9	468.50	Q
2	Gustaf Blomgren	Sweden	11	468.10	Q
3	Harry Prieste	United States	17	441.80	Q
4	Lauri Kyöstilä	Finland	21	441.80	
5	Sven Palle Sørensen	Denmark	21	414.80	
6	Clyde Swendsen	United States	26	414.80	
7	Kalle Kainuvaara	Finland	35	356.80	
8	Sigvard Andersen	Norway	40	264.70	

=== Final ===
Monday, 29 August 1920:

Rank	Diver	Nation	Points	Score
1st place, gold medalist(s)	Clarence Pinkston	United States	7	503.30
2nd place, silver medalist(s)	Erik Adlerz	Sweden	10	495.40
3rd place, bronze medalist(s)	Harry Prieste	United States	16	468.65
4	Gustaf Blomgren	Sweden	23	453.80
5	Yngve Johnson	Sweden	27	424.00
6	Louis Balbach	United States	28	424.00
7	Adolfo Wellisch	Brazil	29	423.80

== Sources ==
- Belgian Olympic Committee (1957). "Olympic Games Antwerp 1920 - Official Report" (PDF). Archived from the original (pdf) on 5 May 2011.
- Herman de Wael (26 January 2001). "Diving - men's platform (Antwerp 1920)".
