= Balbach =

Balbach may refer to:

- Balbach Smelting & Refining Company, a former metal smelting plant in Newark, New Jersey, US
- Oberbalbach ("Upper Balbach"), a district in Lauda-Königshofen, Baden-Württemberg, Germany
- Unterbalbach ("Lower Balbach"), a district in Lauda-Königshofen, Baden-Württemberg, Germany

== People with the surname ==
- Edward Balbach, Jr. (1839–1910), president of Balbach Smelting & Refining Company and inventor of the metallurgical "Balbach Process"
- John Balbach (1820–1896), pioneering settler and prominent citizen of San Jose, California
- Louis Balbach (1896–1943), American diver
