= Diving at the 1920 Summer Olympics – Men's plain high diving =

Men's plain high diving at the Games of the VII Olympiad
- Venue: Stade Nautique d'Antwerp
- Dates: 22–25 August
- Competitors: 22 from 11 nations

Medalists
1st place, gold medalist(s)		Arvid Wallman	Sweden
2nd place, silver medalist(s)		Nils Skoglund	Sweden
3rd place, bronze medalist(s)		John Jansson	Sweden

== Results ==
=== First round ===
The three divers who scored the smallest number of points in each group of the first round advanced to the final.

==== Group 1 ====
Rank	Diver	Nation	Points	Score	Notes
1	Nils Skoglund	Sweden	10	153.0	Q
2	Herold Jansson	Denmark	13	152.0	Q
3	Fernand Sauvage	Belgium	17	145.5	Q
4	Albert Dickin	Great Britain	17	140.5	
5	Sigvard Andersen	Norway	21	139.0	
6	Richard Beauchamp	United States	23	135.0	
7	Guglielmo De Sanctis	Italy	33	98.0	

==== Group 2 ====
Rank	Diver	Nation	Points	Score	Notes
1	Arvid Wallman	Sweden	8	175.5	Q
2	Erik Adlerz	Sweden	11	177.0	Q
3	Adolfo Wellisch	Brazil	14	162.0	Q
4	Kalle Kainuvaara	Finland	15	160.0	
5	Clyde Swendsen	United States	25	148.0	
6	Frank Mullen	United States	27	144.0	
7	Richard Flint	Canada	34	126.0	
8	Masayoshi Uchida	Japan	40	94.0	

==== Group 3 ====
Rank	Diver	Nation	Points	Score	Notes
1	John Jansson	Sweden	8	171.5	Q
2	Harold Clarke	Great Britain	10	164.5	Q
3	Yrjö Valkama	Finland	14	157.0	Q
4	Harry Prieste	United States	18	149.5	
5	Svend Sørensen	Denmark	27	137.0	
6	Bernhard Dahl	Norway	28	136.5	
7	Raymond Desonay	Belgium	35	129.0	

=== Final ===
Rank	Diver	Nation	Points	Score
1st place, gold medalist(s)	Arvid Wallman	Sweden	7	183.5
2nd place, silver medalist(s)	Nils Skoglund	Sweden	8	183.0
3rd place, bronze medalist(s)	John Jansson	Sweden	16	175.0
4	Erik Adlerz	Sweden	19	173.0
5	Yrjö Valkama	Finland	23	167.5
6	Herold Jansson	Denmark	27	159.0
7	Fernand Sauvage	Belgium	34	148.5
8	Adolfo Wellisch	Brazil	37	153.0
9	Harold Clarke	Great Britain	40	142.0

== Sources ==
- Belgian Olympic Committee (1957). "Olympic Games Antwerp 1920 - Official Report" (PDF). Archived from the original (pdf) on 5 May 2011.
- Herman de Wael (26 January 2001). "Diving - men's plain high diving (Antwerp 1920)". Archived from the original on 6 January 2007.
