= Burbank, Santa Clara County, California =

Burbank
- Unincorporated community Census designated place
- Location of Burbank in Santa Clara County.

- Location within the state of California
- Coordinates: 37°19′14″N 121°55′54″W
- Country: United States
- State: California
- County: Santa Clara

Area
  - Total: 0.42 sq mi (1.08 km^{2})
  - Land: 0.42 sq mi (1.08 km^{2})
  - Water: 0 sq mi (0.00 km^{2}) 0%

Population (2020)
  - Total: 4,940
  - Density: 11,868.3/sq mi (4,582.38/km^{2})
- Time zone: UTC-8 (Pacific (PST))
  - Summer (DST): UTC-7 (PDT)
- ZIP codes: 95128
- Area codes: 408/669
- FIPS code: 06-08968
- GNIS feature IDs: 277480, 2407924

Burbank is an unincorporated community in Santa Clara County, California, United States. As an urban island, it is surrounded by the city of San Jose. The population was 4,940 at the 2020 census. For statistical purposes, the United States Census Bureau has defined Burbank as a census-designated place (CDP). The area was named for horticulturist Luther Burbank.

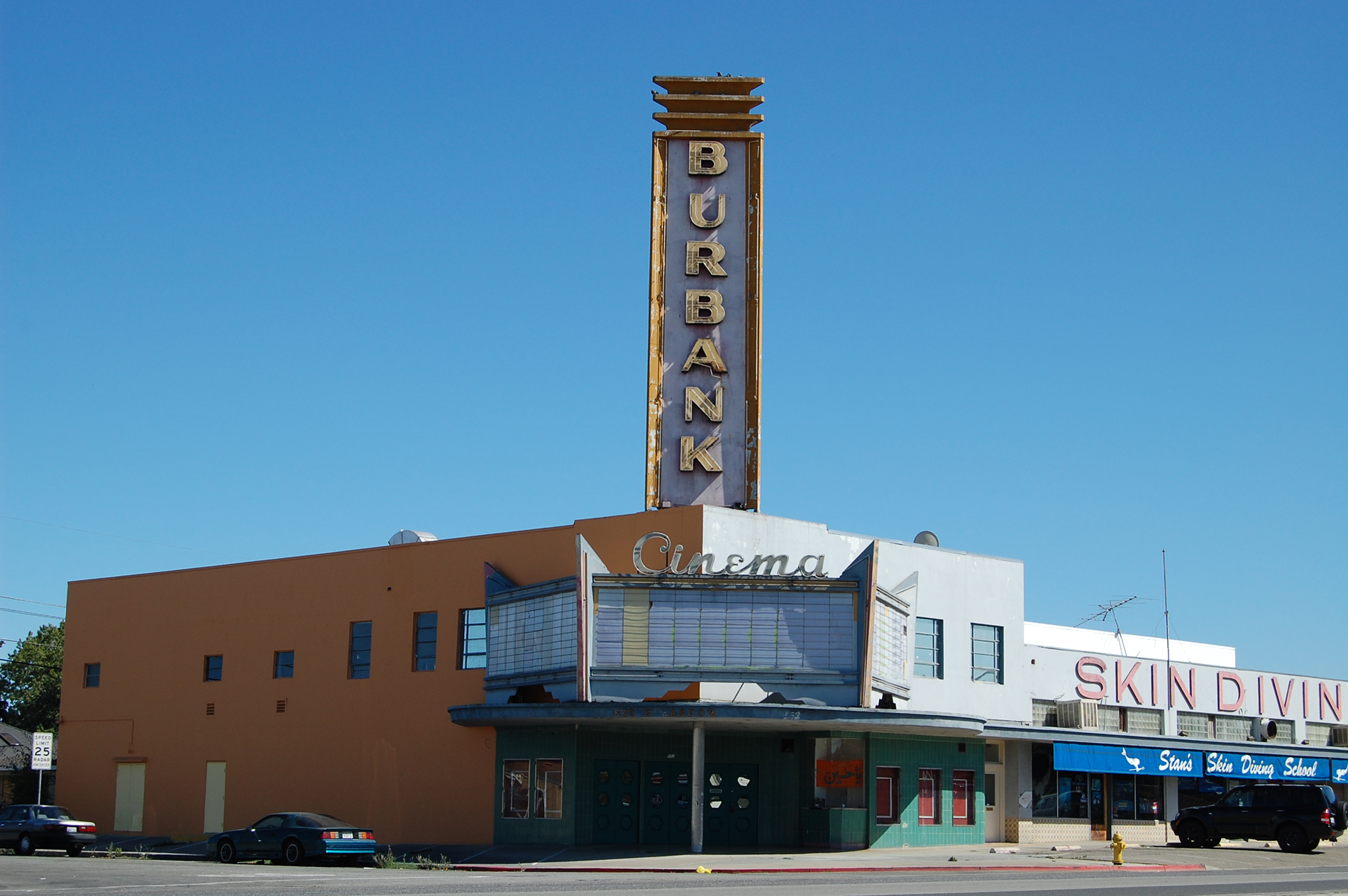
The Burbank Theatre

The area is a center for antique stores and is centrally located to Santana Row, Westfield Valley Fair, and also the downtown area.

The area is in ZIP code 95128 and area codes 408 and 669.

== Geography ==
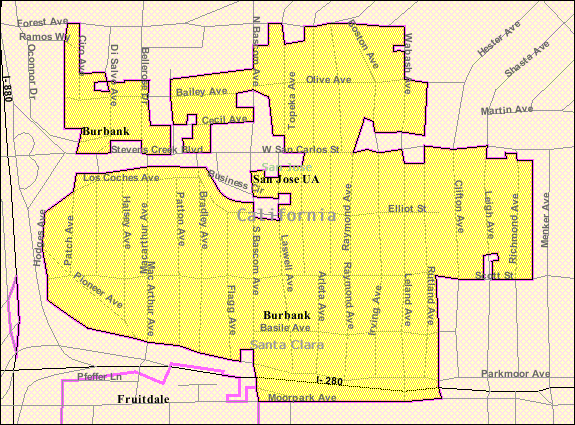
Burbank CDP, California, 2000 Census (image is 1.1 mile across)

According to the United States Census Bureau, the CDP has a total area of 0.4 square miles (1.0 km^{2}), all land.

The Burbank District is roughly defined as an unincorporated area along Bascom Avenue between West San Carlos Street and Interstate 280. The area is an "urban island" entirely surrounded by the City of San Jose.

== Demographics ==
Historical population
Census	Pop.	Note	%±
1990	4,902		—
2000	5,239		6.9%
2010	4,926		−6.0%
2020	4,940		0.3%
U.S. Decennial Census; 1850–1870 1880-1890; 1900 1910 1920; 1930 1940 1950; 1960 1970 1980; 1990 2000 2010

=== 2020 ===
The 2020 United States census reported that Burbank had a population of 4,940, all of whom lived in households. The population density was 11,875.0 inhabitants per square mile (4,585.0/km^{2}). The racial makeup was 37.2% White, 3.0% African American, 1.8% Native American, 14.7% Asian, 0.2% Pacific Islander, 27.0% from other races, and 16.1% from two or more races. Hispanic or Latino of any race were 46.0% of the population.

There were 1,933 households, out of which 29.9% included children under the age of 18, 39.7% were married-couple households, 10.0% were cohabiting couple households, 28.1% had a female householder with no partner present, and 22.2% had a male householder with no partner present. 27.5% of households were one person, and 8.0% were one person aged 65 or older. The average household size was 2.56. There were 1,160 families (60.0% of all households).

The age distribution was 18.3% under the age of 18, 8.4% aged 18 to 24, 35.9% aged 25 to 44, 26.4% aged 45 to 64, and 11.0% who were 65 years of age or older. The median age was 37.2 years. For every 100 females, there were 104.6 males.

There were 2,030 housing units at an average density of 4,879.8 units per square mile (1,884.1 units/km^{2}), of which 1,933 (95.2%) were occupied. Of these, 43.8% were owner-occupied, and 56.2% were occupied by renters.

=== 2010 ===
The 2010 United States census reported that Burbank had a population of 4,926. The population density was 12,218.4 inhabitants per square mile (4,717.6/km^{2}). The racial makeup of Burbank was 2,994 (60.8%) White, 135 (2.7%) African American, 64 (1.3%) Native American, 379 (7.7%) Asian, 16 (0.3%) Pacific Islander, 1,049 (21.3%) from other races, and 289 (5.9%) from two or more races. Hispanic or Latino of any race were 2,509 persons (50.9%).

The Census reported that 100% of the population lived in households.

There were 1,877 households, out of which 620 (33.0%) had children under the age of 18 living in them, 688 (36.7%) were opposite-sex married couples living together, 267 (14.2%) had a female householder with no husband present, 135 (7.2%) had a male householder with no wife present. There were 175 (9.3%) unmarried opposite-sex partnerships, and 40 (2.1%) same-sex married couples or partnerships. 562 households (29.9%) were made up of individuals, and 92 (4.9%) had someone living alone who was 65 years of age or older. The average household size was 2.62. There were 1,090 families (58.1% of all households); the average family size was 3.32.

The population was spread out, with 1,125 people (22.8%) under the age of 18, 485 people (9.8%) aged 18 to 24, 1,737 people (35.3%) aged 25 to 44, 1,273 people (25.8%) aged 45 to 64, and 306 people (6.2%) who were 65 years of age or older. The median age was 34.5 years. For every 100 females, there were 100.9 males. For every 100 females age 18 and over, there were 100.9 males.

There were 1,982 housing units at an average density of 4,916.1 per square mile (1,898.1/km^{2}), of which 823 (43.8%) were owner-occupied, and 1,054 (56.2%) were occupied by renters. The homeowner vacancy rate was 2.0%; the rental vacancy rate was 3.3%. 2,194 people (44.5% of the population) lived in owner-occupied housing units and 2,732 people (55.5%) lived in rental housing units.

== Government ==
At the county level, Burbank is located within the 4th supervisorial district, represented on the Santa Clara County Board of Supervisors by Ken Yeager. In the California State Legislature, Burbank is in the 15th senatorial district, represented by Democrat Dave Cortese, and in the 26th Assembly district, represented by Democrat Patrick Ahrens. In the United States House of Representatives, Burbank is in California's 18th congressional district, represented by Democrat Zoe Lofgren.

The area has been defined by several political entities since 1906 beginning with the Burbank School District, and shortly afterward the Burbank Fire District, which expanded the community far beyond its traditional, political and unofficial boundaries. The Burbank Sanitary District and later the Burbank Community Advisory Council became identifying local political entities.

=== Burbank Sanitary District ===
The Burbank Sanitary District operates the sewer collection lines, handles waste collection and street sweeping. Established in 1940, the Sanitary District is the only local government, other than LBSD, specific to the neighborhood. The District is governed by a Board of five members, elected to four-year terms, which meets monthly. Legal and engineering services, as well as all construction and maintenance, are contracted out.

Sewer services are provided to other unincorporated areas of the Burbank Community by the West Valley Sanitation District, an independent sanitation district that also services neighboring cities and unincorporated areas. Waste collection in the other areas are the jurisdiction of the County of Santa Clara. Sewage treatment is provided by the San Jose/Santa Clara Water Pollution Control Plant a joint powers agency of which both districts are members.

== Education ==
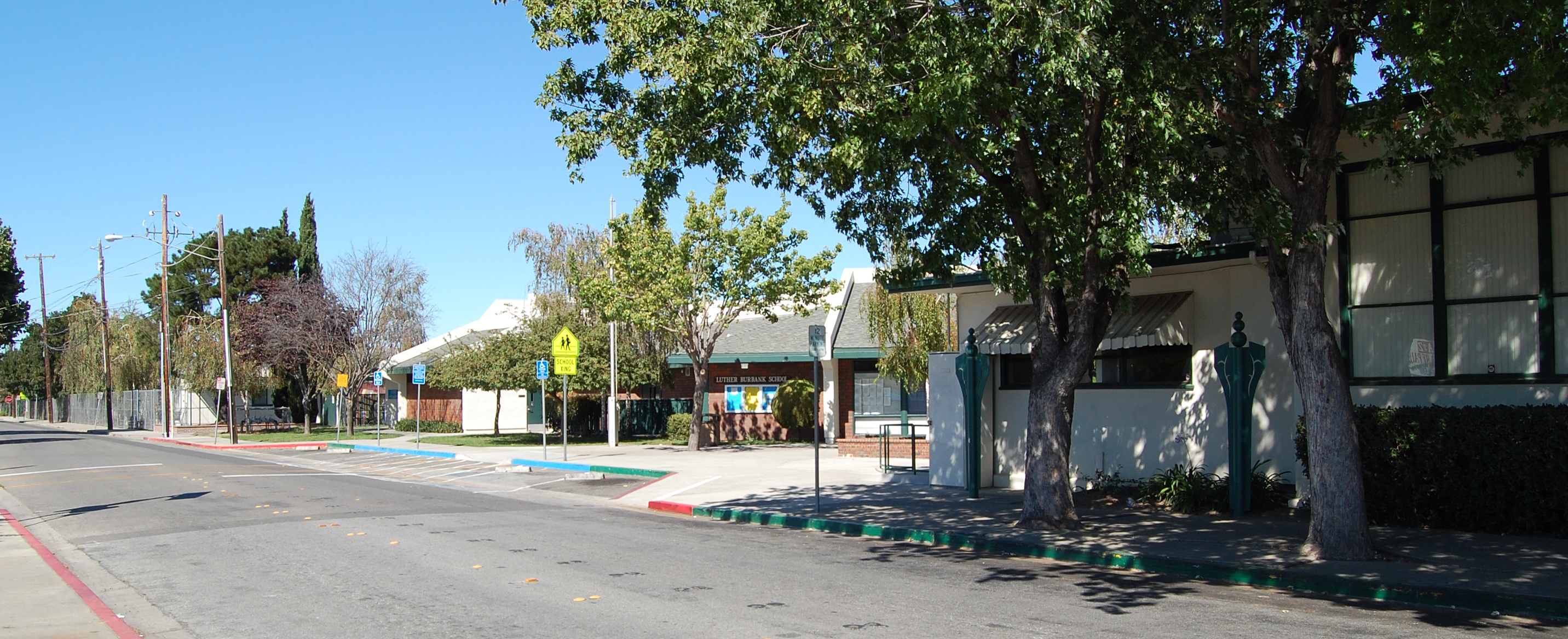
The Luther Burbank School is located at 4 Wabash Avenue.

The only public school located in Burbank is Luther Burbank School, a K-8 elementary school located on San Carlos Street and Wabash. It is the only school operated by the Luther Burbank School District (LBSD). Founded in 1906, the District celebrated its centennial in 2006. Burbank-area students attend high schools in the Campbell Union High School District.

== Landmarks ==
The second Burbank fire station, sold in the late 1970s, is on the northeast corner of Scott Street and Flagg Avenue. The unusually-high garage door is the only clue today that the residence was once a fire station. The fire district became part of Santa Clara County Fire Department, (a.k.a. Central Fire District,) about 1960 and is served by San Jose Fire Department under a contract.

The Burbank Theater is another local landmark supporting use of the name. It is no longer a working theater.

The Burbank Business Circle is the name of a unique San Jose owned roadway that runs through the parking lot of the shopping center on the southwest corner of Bascom Avenue and Stevens Creek Blvd.
