= Diving at the 1920 Summer Olympics – Men's 3 metre springboard =

Men's 3 metre springboard diving at the Games of the VII Olympiad
- Venue: Stade Nautique d'Antwerp
- Dates: 26–27 August
- Competitors: 14 from 9 nations

Medalists
1st place, gold medalist(s)		Louis Kuehn	United States
2nd place, silver medalist(s)		Clarence Pinkston	United States
3rd place, bronze medalist(s)		Louis Balbach	United States

The men's 3 metre springboard was one of five diving events on the diving at the 1920 Summer Olympics program. The competition was held on Friday, 26 August 1920 and on Saturday, 27 August 1920, at the Stade Nautique d'Antwerp.

A point-for-place system was used. For each dive, the divers were ranked according to their dive score and awarded points based on their rank for that dive (the best dive earned 1 point, the next-best 2 points, and so on).

Fourteen divers from nine nations competed. Louis Kuehn from the United States won the gold medal. Clarence Pinkston took silver and Louis Balbach won bronze, making a full American podium.

== Results ==
=== First round ===
The three divers who scored the smallest number of points in each group of the first round advanced to the final.

==== Group 1 ====
Place	Diver	Nation	Points	Score
1	Louis Kuehn	United States	7	628.15
2	Louis Balbach	United States	8	630.80
3	Gunnar Ekstrand	Sweden	15	560.85
4	Oscar Dose	Sweden	20	543.70
5	Richard Flint	Canada	29	480.70
6	Joseph Callens	Belgium	30	476.40
7	Rémy Weil	France	31	477.30

==== Group 2 ====
Place	Diver	Nation	Points	Score
1	Gustaf Blomgren	Sweden	7	614.00
2	Clarence Pinkston	United States	8	622.70
3	John Jansson	Sweden	16	549.70
4	Adolpho Wellisch	Brazil	19	522.85
5	Ernest Walmsley	Great Britain	28	453.05
6	Guglielmo De Sanctis	Italy	29	451.35
7	Paul Knuchel	Switzerland	33	431.35

=== Final ===
Place	Diver	Nation	Points	Score
1st place, gold medalist(s)	Louis Kuehn	United States	10	675.40
2nd place, silver medalist(s)	Clarence Pinkston	United States	11	655.30
3rd place, bronze medalist(s)	Louis Balbach	United States	15	649.50
4	Gustaf Blomgren	Sweden	19	587.05
5	Gunnar Ekstrand	Sweden	27	559.25
6	John Jansson	Sweden	34	544.75

== Sources ==
- Belgian Olympic Committee (1957). "Olympic Games Antwerp 1920 - Official Report" (PDF). Archived from the original (pdf) on 5 May 2011.
- Herman de Wael (24 May 2001). "Diving - men's springboard (Antwerp 1920)".
