= Samuel Gordon =

Samuel or Sam Gordon may refer to:

== Politics ==
- Samuel Y. Gordon (1861–1940), lieutenant governor of Minnesota
- Samuel Gordon (New York politician) (1802–1873), U.S. representative from New York
- Samuel Gordon (Australian politician) (1811–1882), Australian merchant, pastoralist and politician
- Samuel Gordon (Washington County, NY) of 37th New York State Legislature

== Sports ==
- Sam Gordon (baseball) (1878–1962), American baseball player
- Samantha Gordon (born 2003), American football running back
- Samuel Gordon (footballer), bronze medallist for Burma in Football at the 1954 Asian Games
- Sam Gordon (Australian footballer) in 2011 AFL Under 18 Championships

== Others ==
- Samuel Dickey Gordon (1859–1936), author and evangelical lay minister
- Sam Gordon (musician), see George Baquet
- Samuel Gordon (novelist) (1871–1927), English novelist
- Samuel H. Gordon, Russian American physician

== See also ==
- Samuel Gorton (1593–1677), early Rhode Island settler
