= Richard Beauchamp =

Richard Beauchamp may refer to:

- Richard Beauchamp (bishop) (died 1481), English bishop
- Richard Beauchamp (diver) (1901–1975), American Olympic diver
- Richard Beauchamp, 1st Earl of Worcester (c. 1394–1421/2), English peer
- Richard Beauchamp, 13th Earl of Warwick (1382–1439), English nobleman and military commander
- Richard Beauchamp, 2nd Baron Beauchamp (c. 1435–1502/3), English peer
