= Erik Skoglund =

Erik Skoglund may refer to:

- Erik Skoglund (swimmer) (1903–1984), Swedish swimmer
- Erik Skoglund (boxer) (born 1991), Swedish boxer

== See also ==
- Eric Skoglund (born 1992), American baseball pitcher
