= Frank Mullen (disambiguation) =

Frank Mullen is a musician.

Frank Mullen may also refer to:

- Frank Aloysius Mullen (1887–1945), Olympic diver
- Frank X. Mullen, Nevada journalist and author for The Metropolitan
