= Diving at the 1920 Summer Olympics =

Diving at the Games of the VII Olympiad
- Venue: Stade Nautique d'Antwerp
- Dates: 22 August 1920 through 29 August 1920
- No. of events: 5
- Competitors: 53 from 14 nations

At the 1920 Summer Olympics in Antwerp, five diving events were contested. The women's 3 metre springboard competition was added to the Olympic programme. The competitions were held from Monday, 22 August 1920 to Monday, 29 August 1920.

== Medal summary ==
The events are labelled as 3 metre springboard, 10 metre platform and plain high diving by the International Olympic Committee, and appeared on the 1920 Official Report (dated from 1957) as plongeons variés, plongeons de haut vol variés or plongeons ordinaires, and plongeons du tremplin, respectively. The men's high diving and 10 metre platform events included dives from both 10 metre and 5 metre platforms, while the women's 10 metre platform were performed from 8 metre and 4 metre platforms; the springboard events included dives from 3 metre and 1 metre springboards.

=== Men ===
Event	Gold	Silver	Bronze
3 m springboard	Louis Kuehn (USA)	Clarence Pinkston (USA)	Louis Balbach (USA)
10 m platform	Clarence Pinkston (USA)	Erik Adlerz (SWE)	Harry Prieste (USA)
Plain high diving	Arvid Wallman (SWE)	Nils Skoglund (SWE)	John Jansson (SWE)

=== Women ===
Event	Gold	Silver	Bronze
3 m springboard	Aileen Riggin (USA)	Helen Wainwright (USA)	Thelma Payne (USA)
10 m platform	Stefanie Clausen (DEN)	Beatrice Armstrong (GBR)	Eva Olliwier (SWE)

== Participating nations ==
A total of 53 divers (35 men and 18 women) from 14 nations (men from 13 nations - women from 6 nations) competed at the Antwerp Games:

- Australia (1) (men:0 women:1)
- Belgium (3) (men:3 women:0)
- Brazil (1) (men:1 women:0)
- Canada (1) (men:1 women:0)
- Denmark (5) (men:3 women:2)
- Finland (3) (men:3 women:0)
- France (1) (men:1 women:0)
- Great Britain (5) (men:3 women:2)
- Italy (1) (men:1 women:0)
- Japan (1) (men:1 women:0)
- Norway (4) (men:2 women:2)
- Sweden (12) (men:8 women:4)
- Switzerland (1) (men:1 women:0)
- United States (14) (men:7 women:7)

== Medal table ==
Rank	Nation	Gold	Silver	Bronze	Total
1	United States	3	2	3	8
2	Sweden	1	2	2	5
3	Denmark	1	0	0	1
4	Great Britain	0	1	0	1
Totals (4 entries)		5	5	5	15
