= Sonay (name) =

Sonay is a unisex given name in Turkish and a surname. People with the name include:

== Given name ==
- Sonay Adem (1957–2018), Turkish Cypriot politician
- Sonay Kartal (born 2001), British tennis player

== Surname ==
- Raymond Desonay (1889–1988), Belgian diver

== Fictional characters ==
- Sonay, one of the main characters in the Turkish movie Mustang
