= Paul Kohler =

Paul Kohler may refer to:

- Paul Kohler (footballer) (born 1979), Australian footballer
- Paul Kohler (politician), British politician
- Paul Köhler (1895–1969), Danish diver
- Paul Koehler, Canadian musician
