= List of streets in San Jose, California =

This is a list of streets in San Jose, California, with descriptions, historic significance, and name origins.

- California State Route 85, known in part as the West Valley Freeway and the Stevens Creek Freeway
- California State Route 87, known in part as the Guadalupe Freeway
- California State Route 130, known in part as Mount Hamilton Road and Alum Rock Avenue
- State Route 82, also known as El Camino Real, after the historic El Camino Real
- The Alameda — Spanish term for a public tree-lined avenue that translates in French to Boulevard. It refers to the stretch of historic road connecting Mission Santa Clara with the Pueblo of San Jose.
- Alum Rock Avenue — named after the misidentified alum rock (thenardite mineral) and springs in the canyon at the end of Alum Rock Avenue; a continuation of El Camino Real, The Alameda and Santa Clara Street.
- Asbury — named after Methodist Bishop Francis Asbury
- Arroyo de Oro — Spanish for Gold Creek
- Auzerais Avenue — named after John Auzerais, an early San Jose pioneer. Originally called Sainsevain Street.
- Bailey Avenue — There are two streets called Bailey Avenue in the area. The one nearest Morgan Hill is named after Boanerges R. Bailey.
- Balbach Street — named after John Balbach, owner of Pioneer Carriage Manufacturing in 1864.
- Balboa Avenue — named after Spanish explorer Vasco Núñez de Balboa
- Barack Obama Boulevard – named after President Barack Obama
- Bascom Avenue — Anna Maria and her husband Lewis Hazelton Bascom
- Bassett Street — named after Southern Pacific Railroad Superintendent Almeron C. Bassett.
- Bernal Road — named after Ygnacio Bernal's 400 acres of fruit and vegetable farmland in southeast San Jose.
- Berryessa Road — named after San Jose pioneer Nicholas Berryessa and his descendants.
- Bird Avenue — named after Isaac and Calvert Bird, who lived in the area.
- Blach Place — named after Michael S. Blach, the founder of Blach Construction Company
- Blossom Hill Road — The original section of Blossom Hill Road, between today's Los Gatos Boulevard and Camden Avenue, that runs along the base of Blossom Hill, in turn named for the scenic blossoms from the vast orchards that once dominated the landscape. The road was extended in the 1950s and 1960s over portions of Kooser Road and Downer Avenue.
- Bollinger Road — named after Christian Bollinger, who was born in Bollinger County, Missouri in 1817 and ended up farming 184 acres on Saratoga Avenue in 1883.
- Booksin Avenue — named after early pioneer Henry Booksin, who owned fruit orchards in the Willows of Santa Clara County.
- Branham Lane — named after early pioneer Isaac Branham, who settled the area in 1846.
- Cahill Street — named after Hiram B. Cahill's five-acre home. The Diridon train station at this location was previously named Cahill Depot.
- Camden Avenue — An abbreviation of Campbell to New Almaden Mine. In 1886 the South Pacific Coast Railroad built the Camden Branch, a spur from its Oakland-Santa Cruz line to serve the quicksilver mines at New Almaden; this line was abandoned in the 1930s, and Camden Avenue follows this right-of-way from today's Winchester Boulevard to Kooser Road. Previously called Railroad Avenue.
- Canoas Garden Avenue — named after the Canoas Creek. Canoas is Portuguese for "canoe".
- Chaboya Road — named after Antonio Chabolla in 1833.
- Chapman Street — named after W. S. Chapman, who partnered with Moses Davis in selling the original housing lots in the Rose Garden neighborhood, then called Poplar City.
- Cinnabar Street — named after the mineral cinnabar, mined in the nearby New Almaden area, from, which elemental mercury (quicksilver) was derived and used to extract gold during the California Gold Rush.
- Cleaves Avenue — named after San Jose pioneers Jeremiah and Margaret Cleaves, who lived on The Alameda.
- Cleveland Avenue — named in honor of United States President Grover Cleveland
- Coe Avenue — named after Henry Willard Coe, Sr., a trader in mining supplies who bought 150 acres in the Willows of Santa Clara County.
- Cory Avenue — named after Doctor Benjamin Cory, the first medical practitioner in Santa Clara County in 1847.
- Cottle Avenue (not to be confused with Cottle Road) — named after Frank Cottle, who bought the Willows Orchard in 1883 from his father, Royal Cottle.
- Cottle Road — named after Warren Cottle, whose ranch bordered Monterey and Snell Roads.
- Cunningham Avenue — The street, park and man-made flood control lake are named after James F. Cunningham.
- Curtner Avenue — named after Henry and Lucy Curtner, early San Jose pioneers. It was also called Casey Road, after the Lewis Casey family, but renamed Curtner Avenue when they connected.
- Dana Avenue — named after the Dana farm, which was purchased by the city for schools..
- Davis Street — named after Moses Davis, who partnered with W. S. Chapman in selling the original housing lots in the Rose Garden neighborhood, then called Poplar City.
- De Mattei Court — named after Michael de Mattei of San Jose Ravenna Paste Company.
- Delmas Avenue (downtown San Jose) — Antoine Delmas, who owned the French Gardens tract.
- Di Fiore Drive — named after the Di Fiore family and their cannery and orchard operations in the nearby Burbank neighborhood.
- Donohue Drive — named after Peter Donahue (businessman), who built the San Francisco to San Jose Railroad company.
- Dry Creek Road — named after the flood of 1866 that changed the flow of the Los Gatos Creek, turning this section into a dry creek river bed, later converted to a roadway.
- Eastus Drive — named after San Jose Deputy City Manager, John Eastus
- Emory Street — named after Methodist Bishop John Emory
- Fiesta Lane — named after the Fiesta Lane Bowling Alley that used to be at this location.
- Flickinger Avenue — named after Joseph H. Flickinger and his Orchard Cannery.
- Fountain Alley - named after the artesian well at First and Santa Clara Streets that overflowed enough to flood the surrounding area, including what was then Archer Street. Archer street was named after Lawrence Archer. Because of the flooding and repurposing of Archer street into a drainage ditch it was renamed Fountain street. It was a narrow street that the locals called Fountain Alley, so that is what it is called today.
- Fowler Road — named after abolitionist Andrew Jackson Fowler's 173-acre ranch, which he bought in 1867.
- Fox Avenue — named after Bernard S. Fox, who was Commodore Stockton's tree nurseryman at the Stockton Ranch in 1852, or possibly his nephew Richard D. Fox.
- Forbes Drive — named after James Alexander Forbes, who owned the New Almaden Quicksilver Mine and helped to establish Santa Clara College.
- Le Franc Drive — named after Charles Lefranc
- Fremont Street — named after John C. Frémont, who served under Commodore Stockton in the Mexican–American War and became California's First Military Governor.
- Gion Avenue — Thomas Gion
- Gish Road — named after David Ellison Gish's farm, which he purchased in 1851 after giving up on gold mining.
- Goodwin Avenue — named after San Jose City Manager C. B. Goodwin
- Goodyear Street — named after Miles Goodyear, who owned 30 acres in the area.
- Graham Avenue — named after John (Jack) Martin Graham, a baseball columnist for the San Jose Mercury Herald. The street is where the baseball grandstands used to be.
- Hamilton Avenue — named after Zeri Hamilton, an early San Jose pioneer, who bought the property off Meridian Avenue in 1850.
- Hamline Street — named in honor of Methodist Episcopal Bishop Leonidas Lent Hamline in 1866.
- Hanchett Avenue — named after Lewis E. Hanchett, an early San Jose property developer, who in 1907 developed the Hanchett Residence Park neighborhood.
- Harding Avenue — named after United States President Warren G. Harding, who died while visiting the West Coast.
- Harwood Road — named after G. M. Harwood, who planted a vineyard at this site.
- Hedding Street — named after Methodist Bishop Elijah Hedding Rosa Street was connected to and renamed Hedding Street.
- Hensley Street — Samuel Hensley
- Hester Avenue — named after the Honorable Craven P. Hester, an early Judge in San Jose, whose home was nearby on the Alameda.
- Hobson Street — named after George Hobson, San Jose's First Milk Man. Also owned the property where Valley Medical Hospital is.
- Hoover Avenue — named after American President Herbert Hoover and famed first class of students at Stanford University.
- Idaho Street — originally named Moore Street, renamed Idaho Street in 1933.
- Jackson Street — named after United States President Andrew Jackson
- Julian Street — Captain Julian Hanks resident of early Pueblo San Jose.
- Keeble Avenue — named after local orchard owners and brothers Edward and Richard Keeble, the largest green fruit shipper in America.
- King Road — named after Andrew Lewis King, who settled in San Jose in 1851. There were plans to rename it Martin Luther King Jr. Road.
- Lawrence Expressway — Originally Lawrence Station Road, named after the Lawrence Railroad Station in 1863, which was named after Albert Chester Bull, who changed his name to Lawrence by an act of Massachusetts law.
- Leigh Avenue — named after H. A. Leigh.
- Lenzen Avenue — named after San Jose's first and most prolific architect Theodore Lenzen
- Lester Avenue — named after Nathan L. Lester, who had a home on nearby Lincoln Avenue.
- Lightstone Alley — named after Franz Lichtenstein (Frank Lightston), who own most of the area and operated the first store in San Jose with Charles Weber.
- Lindbergh Avenue — named in honor of American aviator Charles Lindbergh.
- Locust Street — named after the honey locust tree, one of many streets in the area named after tree types.
- Luther — named after Luther Burbank a famous American botanist, who helped Santa Clara Valley's fruit industry.
- Magellan — named after Portuguese Explorer Ferdinand Magellan
- Magnolia Avenue — named after the Magnolia Trees that were originally planted along the street when the original lots were sold by Charles M. Schiele.
- Mariposa Avenue — Spanish for Butterfly. Named after Mariposa Grove a sequoia grove next to Yosemite (which is also a parallel street to Mariposa Avenue in the Hanchett Residence Park).
- Martin Avenue — named after John Martin, a business partner of Lewis Hanchett and their Hanchett Residence Park development where the street is.
- Maybury Road — named after Frank Maybury, an early farmer, who owned a 63-acre farm where the road is today.
- McAbee Road — named after gopher trap inventor Zephyr Macabee, whose 1890 traps are still sold today.
- McDaniel Avenue — named after Josiah Jennings McDaniel a Confederate soldier, who married local Amanda Fine and set up their 4-acre family farm ran along Union Avenue (now called Park Avenue) where the street is today.
- McKee — named after Joseph Olcott McKee, who had a farm in the area. He and his father were responsible for helping physically move the state capitol from San Jose to Vallejo.
- McKendrie — named after Methodist Bishop William McKendree
- McLaughlin Avenue — named after Edward and Adelia McLaughlin, who moved to the area from Grass Valley.
- Melrose Avenue — Latin for "honey rose" (sweet and beautiful)
- Meridian Avenue — so named because the section from Park Avenue to near Curtner Avenue aligns with the Mount Diablo Meridian.
- Mission Street — named after the California Missions.
- Montague Expressway — named after 1870s Millionaire Wilford Weed Montague's 400-acre "Riverside Farm" where the original Montague Road (between today's Lafayette Street and North First Street) ran along the northern edge.
- Montgomery Street — named after T. S. Montgomery, a San Jose real estate developer, whose property, hotel and railroad interests are nearby.
- Moorpark Avenue — named after the Moorpark apricot imported from England in 1854 by D. C. Vestal, once a major cash crop in Santa Clara County.
- Moore Street — named after Judge John Moore, renamed Idaho Street in 1933 to reduce confusion with Morse cross street. Shown on an early map as "More" street.
- Morrison Avenue — named after early San Jose Mayor James Morrison.
- Morse Street — named after Santa Clara resident Charles Copeland Morse, who founded the Ferry-Morse Seed Company in 1884
- Muller Place — the Muller family, who owned Lou's Village Restaurant and property around it from 1946-2006.
- Naglee Avenue — Union General Henry Morris Naglee
- Newhall Street — named after Henry Mayo Newhall, a founder of the San Francisco to San Jose Railroad company.
- Park Avenue — Originally named Union Avenue during the Civil War when the South Side Railroad ran along it. Was later renamed Park Avenue when Hanchett Residence Park was developed in 1907.
- Parkmoor Avenue — A play on names of Moorpark Avenue (named after an apricot variety), a nearby parallel street on the other side of Interstate 280.
- Pearl Avenue — named after John Quincy Pearl, who owned 600 acres of the Almaden Valley in 1852.
- Pellier Avenue & Court — named after Louis Pellier, who founded Santa Clara Valley's prune industry using French prune cuttings and techniques.
- Pershing Avenue — named after famed Brigadier General John J. Pershing, who led San Francisco Presidio's 8th Brigade in pursuit of Pancho Villa.
- Phelan Avenue — named after James Duval Phelan, California's first popular elected senator.
- Polhemus — named after Charles Bispham Polhemus, an early San Jose railroad pioneer that owned the land that would later become Atherton, Millbrae & Menlo Park. Renamed Taylor Avenue in 1960.
- Portal Court & Portal Way — named after Louis Portal, who owned 400 acres of vineyards in San Jose.
- Race Street (and Race Park) — named after Agricultural Park and the racetrack within it. The county park was later sold and developed into the Shasta Hanchett Park neighborhood.
- Randol Avenue — named after James B. Randol, manager of the New Almaden Quicksilver Mine, who was part owner of the Dougherty-Randol Tract where the street is.
- Reed Street — James F. Reed of the ill-fated Donner Party, with members of his family and associates similarly honored:
  - Margaret Street — James Frazier Reed's wife Margret Backenstoe Reed
  - Virginia Street — Margret Reed's daughter Virginia Elizabeth Backenstoe
  - Martha Street — James & Margret Reed's daughter Martha Jane ("Patty") Reed Lewis
  - Keyes Street — Margret Reed's maiden name, Keyes
  - Bestor Street — James Frazier Reed's surveyor, Norman Bestor, who made subdivisions of Reed reservation
- Rhodes Court — named after Judge A. L. Rhodes, whose house was at the corner of Rhodes Court and the Alameda.
- Saint James Street — named after Mission San Diego de Alcalá. San Jose's early downtown streets were named after the 21 California missions. James is the English translation of Diego.
- Saint John Street — named after Mission San Juan Bautista. San Jose's early downtown streets were named after the 21 California missions. John is the English translation of Juan.
- San Antonio Street — named after Mission San Antonio de Padua. San Jose's early downtown streets were named after the 21 California missions.
- San Carlos Street — named after Mission San Carlos Borromeo de Carmelo or Mission Carmel as it is called today. San Jose's early downtown streets were named after the 21 California missions.
- San Fernando Street — named after Mission San Fernando Rey de España. San Jose's early downtown streets were named after the 21 California missions.
- San Salvador Street — Spanish for Holy Savior.
- Santa Ana Ave — named after Saint Anne
- Santa Clara Street — named after Mission Santa Clara. San Jose's early downtown streets were named after the 21 California Missions.
- Schiele Avenue — named after Charles M. Schiele, who owned the Pacific Hotel, was on the city council. Schiele Ave and Magnolia Ave were developed by him.
- Senter Roard — named after German Senter.
- Sequoia Avenue — named after Sequoia National Park
- Sierra Avenue — named after the Sierra Nevada mountain range that Yosemite National Park is in.
- Singletary — named after Emory C. Singletary's mansion on The Alameda at this location. Emory Singletary was an early San Jose pioneer, who founded the First National Bank of San Jose in 1874 and was director of the California State Agricultural Society
- Stockton Avenue — Commodore Robert F. Stockton, who developed the Garden Alameda neighborhood that the street borders.
- Sunol Street — named after Spanish settler Antonio Marie Suñol (1796–1865), who partnered with Henry Morris Naglee to convert Mexican land grants in 1857.
- Taylor — named after Methodist Bishop Alfred Taylor Howard
- Trinidad Street — Spanish for Trinity.
- Tully Road — named after John Tully, who owned several thousand acres in Evergreen Valley.
- University Street — named for the street that was the main entrance to the University of the Pacific before it moved to Stockton, California and the facility became Bellarmine College Prep High School. San Jose State University keeps their president's home on this street as well.
- Vendome Avenue — named after the mansion of Josiah Belden that later became the Vendome Hotel.
- Vermont Street — Originally named Morris after the Methodist Bishop, but was changed to Vermont to avoid confusion with nearby Morse Street.
- Vestal Street — named after virgin nuns.
- Villa Avenue — named to commemorate Brigadier General John J. Pershing's Pancho Villa Expedition of 1916. Two streets over is Pershing Avenue.
- Virginia Avenue — Was previously named Home Street.
- Washington Street — named after United States President George Washington
- White Road — Charles White, magistrate of Pueblo of San Jose during the handoff from Mexico to the Republic of California.
- Wilson Avenue — named after United States President Woodrow Wilson and was located at the intersection of the "Open Air Arena" on the Alameda.
- Winchester Boulevard — indirectly after Sarah Winchester, for building her home along this road, which became the famed Winchester Mystery House after her death.
- Woz Way — named after Apple Inc. co-founder Steve Wozniak. After donating the money and refusing the naming rights to the San Jose Children's museum the city honored him by renaming the street in front of the museum after him.
- Yosemite Avenue — named after Yosemite National Park
- Zanker Road — named after William Zanker, who owned a large section of the Alviso District
