= Gunnar Ekstrand =

Swedish diver

Personal information
- Born: January 19, 1892; Gothenburg, Sweden
- Died: June 10, 1966 (aged 74); Gothenburg, Sweden

Sport
- Sport: Diving

Gunnar Ekstrand (January 19, 1892 – June 10, 1966) was a Swedish diver who competed in the 1912 Summer Olympics and in the 1920 Summer Olympics.

In 1912, he was eliminated in the first round of the plain high diving competition. Eight years later, at the Antwerp Games, he finished fifth in the 3 metre springboard event. In the 10 metre platform competition he was eliminated in the first round.
