= Fernand Sauvage =

Belgian diver

Personal information
- Nationality: Belgian
- Born: 19 May 1890

Sport
- Sport: Diving

Fernand Sauvage (born 19 May 1890, date of death unknown) was a Belgian diver. He competed in the men's plain high diving event at the 1920 Summer Olympics.
