= Joseph Callens =

Belgian swimmer and diver (1904–1979)

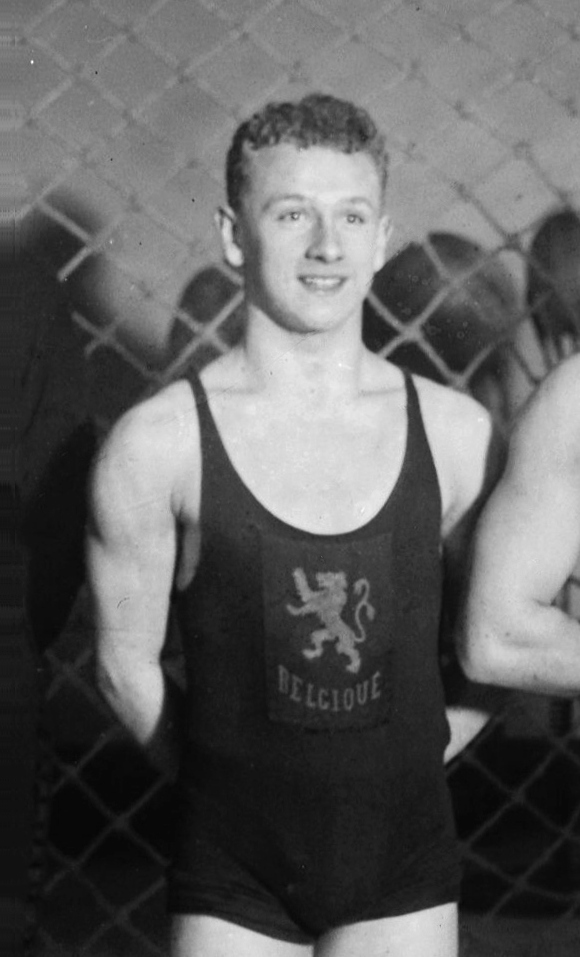
- Joseph Callens in 1922

Personal information
- Born: 22 February 1904 Antwerp, Belgium
- Died: 8 April 1979 (aged 75) Antwerp, Belgium

Sport
- Sport: Swimming, diving

Joseph Maria Leo Callens (22 February 1904 – 8 April 1979) was a Belgian freestyle swimmer and diver. He competed at the 1920 Summer Olympics in the 3 meter springboard and at the 1924 Summer Olympics in the 4 × 200 m freestyle relay, but failed to reach the finals.
