= Arvid Wallman =

Swedish diver

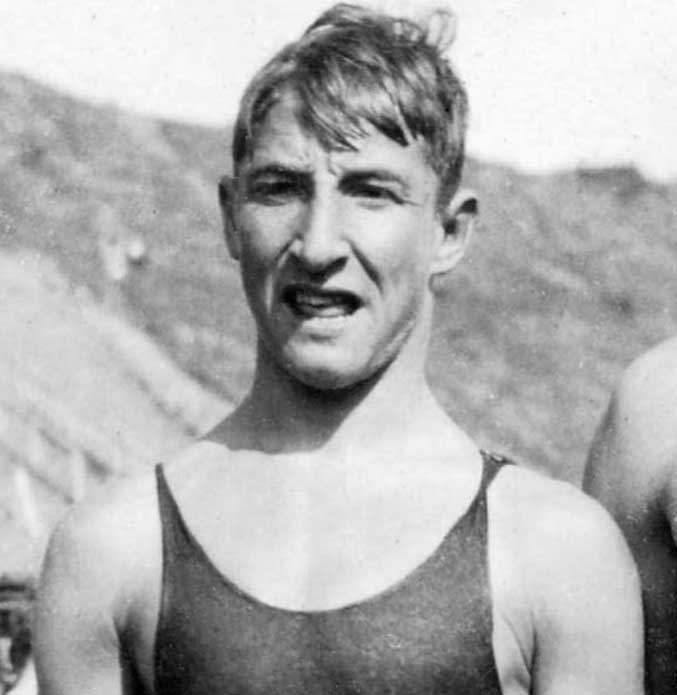

Personal information
- Born: 3 February 1901 Gothenburg, Sweden-Norway
- Died: 25 October 1982 (aged 81) Västra Frölunda, Göteborg, Sweden
- Education: Chalmers University of Technology

Sport
- Sport: Diving
- Club: Simklubben S02, Göteborg
Medal record
Representing Sweden
Olympic Games
Gold medal – first place	1920 Antwerp	plain high diving

Arvid Håkan Herbert Carlsson "Fågeln" Wallman (3 February 1901 – 25 October 1982) was a Swedish diver. He competed in the plain high diving event at the 1920 and 1924 Summer Olympics and finished in first and eighth place, respectively. After graduating in 1923 from the Chalmers University of Technology, he worked as a civil engineer. His granddaughter Susanne Wetteskog also became an Olympic diver.
