= Ernest Walmsley =

British diver

Personal information
- Nationality: British
- Born: 12 August 1887; Barrow-in-Furness, Great Britain
- Died: 8 May 1970 (aged 82); Brighton, Great Britain

Sport
- Sport: Diving

Ernest Walmsley (12 August 1887 – 8 May 1970) was a British diver. He competed in the men's 3 metre springboard event at the 1920 Summer Olympics.
