= Alfred Taylor Howard =

Alfred Taylor Howard (12 March 1868 – 12 November 1948) was a bishop of the Church of the United Brethren in Christ, elected in 1913.

== Birth and family ==
Alfred was born in the rural community of Pleasant Valley, Prairie Ronde Township, near the town of Schoolcraft, Kalamazoo County, Michigan. His is the story of a farm boy who responded to the call of the far horizon to become a world citizen and a Christian witness to the uttermost part of the earth.

The Pleasant Valley neighbourhood, though a small area, was ethnically diverse. Early settlers had come from several Eastern states, as well as directly from England, the Netherlands, and Germany.

Alfred was the son of Cornelius Howard, who was born in Michigan in 1841. His mother was Harriett Guilford. Alfred's paternal grandfather was of English lineage, arriving in Michigan from White Plains, New York. His paternal grandmother was Margaret Osterhut of Dutch descent.

Cornelius was deeply involved and powerfully loyal to the Church of the United Brethren in Christ. He was a frequent lay member to the St. Joseph Annual Conference, twice to the General Conference, and served for ten years as a Trustee of Otterbein College. Harriett Howard was likewise devoted, if unobtrusive in her religious expression. As a boy Alfred was uplifted by the sound of his mother's voice raised in prayer as she went about her housework.

== Boyhood and early education ==
Alfred's favorite reading in boyhood was the Youth's Companion, a weekly magazine for young people, filled with hair-raising tales of Indian fights on the frontier. As a man Alfred expressed regret that those exciting stories always assumed the Indians had no rights on the land where they were reared and on which their ancestors had lived for generations.

Alfred attended country school, then the Schoolcraft High School, four miles from his home. His favorite high school subject was physical geography. He also enjoyed physiology, which prompted in him for many years the desire to study medicine. At the age of eighteen he taught school one year in his neighborhood. The next year he taught near Davenport, Nebraska.

Young Alfred was often encouraged to attend college. One of his encouragers was his pastor, the Rev. J. L. Parks. Thus, it was decided that Alfred should attend Roanoke Classical Seminary in Indiana. The Principal was Professor D. N. Howe, a graduate of Otterbein and of the Union Biblical Seminary in Dayton, Ohio (now United Theological Seminary). Alfred enjoyed these college preparatory studies under Professor Howe. After this one year, however, because the Roanoke Seminary moved to North Manchester, Indiana, Alfred decided to attend Otterbein in Westerville, Ohio.

== College ==
The autumn of 1889 found Alfred Howard, at the age of twenty-one, enrolled in the academy of Otterbein College. One year later he matriculated to the college itself. His days at Otterbein were happy ones, and he never tired in later years of relating his college memories. Alfred was an earnest student, with a mind thirsty for truth, a characteristic he retained the rest of his life. Nevertheless, bad eyesight severely handicapped him, and he had great difficulty getting glasses which fit properly.

Heredity and an active farm upbringing gave Alfred a powerful physique. In college, he played varsity football, alternating between center and guard. Frequently he was pivot man in the famous "flying wedge."

== Music ==
Alfred sang first tenor in the Otterbein Quartet, the first of a series of such organizations in the history of the college. On one occasion the quartet sang at the church of W. W. Williamson, who had a son John. The latter was fascinated by the singing collegians and vowed to also someday go to Otterbein and sing in the quartet. In due time John Finley Williamson did both, and much more than that. He continued his musical interests after graduation, organizing a choir and a choir school: founding the Westminster Choir College in Dayton, Ohio, (presently in Princeton, New Jersey), which became world famous.

One year Alfred directed the Presbyterian Church choir in Marion, Ohio, traveling from Otterbein each weekend. The pastor was a Rev. Mr. Thomas, whose young son Norman became well acquainted with Alfred. Later Norman Thomas also became a Presbyterian minister, but is better known as the frequent candidate for President of the United States on the Socialist ticket.

== Y.M.C.A. ==
The Young Men's Christian Association on the Otterbein campus made a rich contribution to Alfred Howard's life. S. D. Gordon was state secretary of college Y.M.C.A. work in Ohio at that time, and John R. Mott and Robert E. Speer, young men just out of Cornell and Princeton, respectively, were frequent speakers at Y.M.C.A. conferences.

In 1890 at one such conference John R. Mott made an address which engraved three unforgotten sentences on young Howard's mind:

Hide the Word of God in your Heart (Bible Study)
Tie yourself to one man (personal evangelism)
Keep your eyes fixed on the uttermost part of the earth (foreign missions).

One summer Alfred even attended the famous college Y.M.C.A. conference at Northfield, Massachusetts.

== Marriage ==
Howard met May Day Stevenson at Otterbein. They conducted their courtship on the campus, but he proposed to her one summer by letter.

Alfred and May were married on their graduation day: 15 June 1894, in the home of Professor Henry Garst, who performed the ceremony in the presence of many college friends. Soon thereafter the happy couple were on the high seas sailing for the mission field in Africa. The couple had three children, John, Donald and Florence.

== Call to missionary service ==
Alfred Taylor Howard was deeply religious. He believed profoundly in the efficacy of prayer. As a boy he had formed the habit of prayer, and as a college student prayed regularly. In later life, while taking long walks, he would pray for long lists of persons and causes, setting aside certain days of the week for various portions of his long prayer lists.

Toward the end of his college days, Alfred wondered about what his lifework should be. So, he made this a matter for prayer. During the summer before his senior year, while working on his father's farm, he chose a certain empty stall in the barn as his "quiet place" for daily intercession. Later he wrote, "I do not know when in my life I ever prayed more earnestly for definite guidance."

In his handwritten memoirs, found after his death, he tells of the outcome of his prayer:

One day early in August, Dr. William M. Bell, an old friend of father's, was to speak at a county Sunday school convention in Kalamazoo. Doctor Bell had been elected general secretary of the Home, Frontier and Foreign Missionary Society of the United Brethren Church. My brother Roy and I drove to Kalamazoo to hear him. We saw him for just a few minutes before his address to the convention. He said he wished to see me after the meeting. Accordingly at the close of the program he came through the crowd toward me, and to my surprise, stated, "Howard, we want you to go to Africa."

== See also ==
- List of bishops of the United Methodist Church
