= Adolpho Wellisch =

Brazilian diver

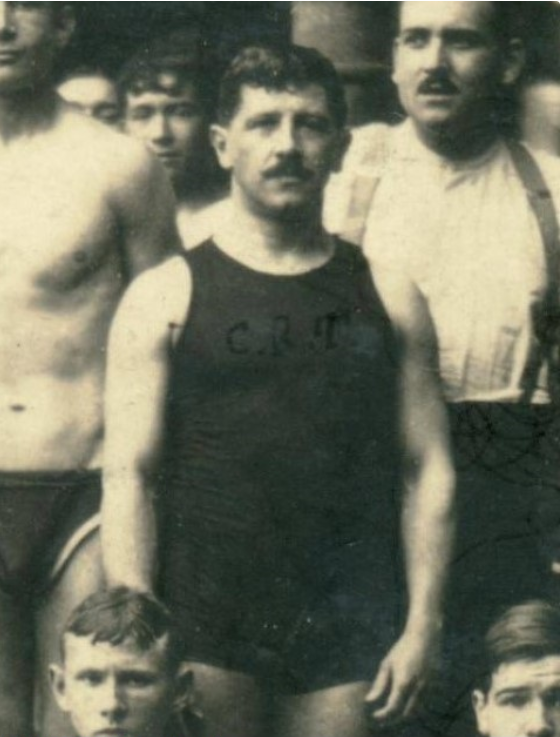
- Wellisch in 1915

Personal information
- Full name: Adolpho Wellisch
- Born: 9 February 1886 Rio de Janeiro, Brazil
- Died: 19 October 1972 (aged 86) Rio de Janeiro, Brazil

Sport
- Sport: Diving

Adolpho Wellisch (9 February 1886 – 19 October 1972) was a Brazilian diver. Domestically, he represented the Tietê Rowing Club. He was selected to be part of the first Brazilian team at the Olympic Games, doing so at the 1928 Summer Olympics, and competed in all three men's diving events. His highest position was seventh in the men's 10 metre platform.

== Biography ==
Adolpho Wellisch was born on 9 February 1886 in Rio de Janeiro, Brazil. Domestically, he competed for the Tietê Rowing Club.

During his career as a diver, he was selected to be part of the first Brazilian team at the Olympic Games, which made their debut at the 1920 Summer Olympics held in Antwerp, Belgium. He competed in all three men's events.

Wellisch first competed in the preliminary round of the men's plain high event on 22 August. There, he placed third with 162 points and qualified for the finals which was held on 25 August. He earned 153 points and placed eighth out of the nine athletes that competed in the final. He then competed in the preliminary round of the men's 3 metre springboard event on 26 August but failed to advance after placing fourth in his group with a total of 522.85 points. His last event was the men's 10 metre platform event. He automatically qualified for the final held on 29 August and placed last out of the seven competitors that competed, his highest placement at the Summer Games.

After the 1920 Summer Games, he competed for Brazil at the 1922 Latin American Games. Wellisch later died on 19 October 1972 in Rio de Janeiro at the age of 86.
