= Bernhard Dahl =

Norwegian diver

Personal information
- Nationality: Norwegian
- Born: 23 November 1898; Bergen, Norway
- Died: 14 February 1963 (aged 64); Bergen, Norway

Sport
- Sport: Diving

Bernhard Dahl (23 November 1898 – 14 February 1963) was a Norwegian diver. He competed in the men's plain high diving event at the 1920 Summer Olympics.
