= Electrowinning =

Electrolytic extraction process

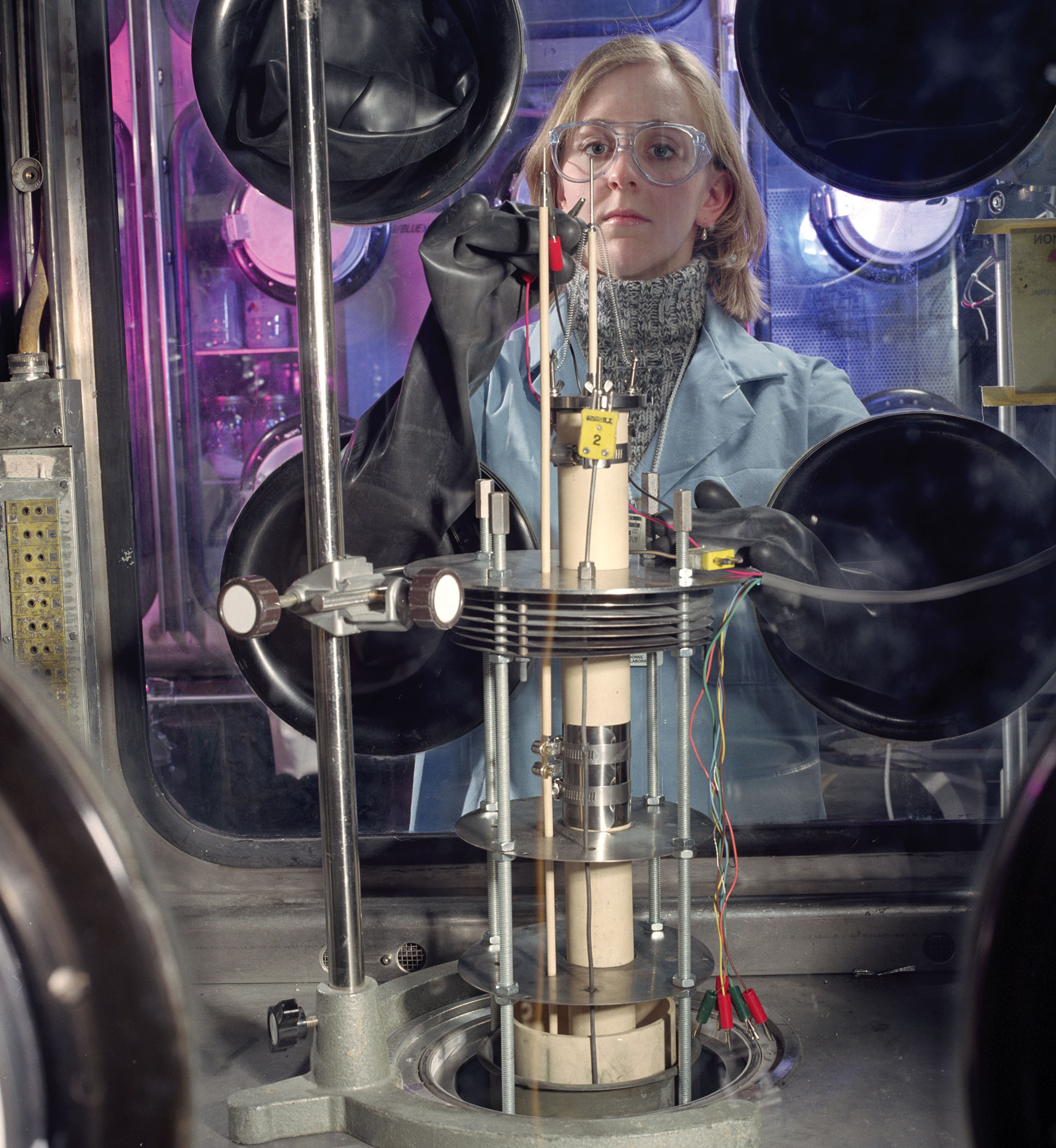
Electrorefining technology converting spent commercial nuclear fuel into metal.

Electrowinning, also called electroextraction, is the electrodeposition of metals from their ores that have been put in solution via a process commonly referred to as leaching. Electrorefining uses a similar process to remove impurities from a metal. However, in electrorefining, the overall electron balance is zero, whereas electrowinning shows a net positive electron consumption in the overall reaction. Both processes use electroplating on a large scale and are important techniques for the economical and straightforward purification of non-ferrous metals. The resulting metals are said to be electrowon.

In electrowinning, an electrical current is passed from an inert anode through a leach solution containing the dissolved metal ions so that the metal is recovered as it is reduced and deposited in an electroplating process onto the cathode. In electrorefining, the anode consists of the impure metal (e.g., copper) to be refined. The impure metallic anode is oxidized and the metal dissolves into solution. The metal ions migrate through the electrolyte towards the cathode where the pure metal is deposited. Insoluble solid impurities sedimenting below the anode often contain valuable rare elements such as gold, silver and selenium.

== History ==
Electrorefining copper

Electrowinning is the oldest industrial electrolytic process. The English chemist Humphry Davy obtained sodium metal in elemental form for the first time in 1807 by the electrolysis of molten sodium hydroxide.

Electrorefining of copper was first demonstrated experimentally by Maximilian, Duke of Leuchtenberg in 1847.

James Elkington patented the commercial process in 1865 and opened the first successful plant in Pembrey, Wales in 1870. The first commercial plant in the United States was the Balbach and Sons Refining and Smelting Company in Newark, New Jersey in 1883.

== Applications ==
Nickel and copper are often obtained by electrowinning. These metals have some noble character, which enables their soluble cationic forms to be reduced to their pure metallic form at mild applied potentials applied between the cathode and the anode. The USA extensively used electrorefining--with molten salt electrolytes--to produce high purity plutonium for use in nuclear weapons.

== Process ==
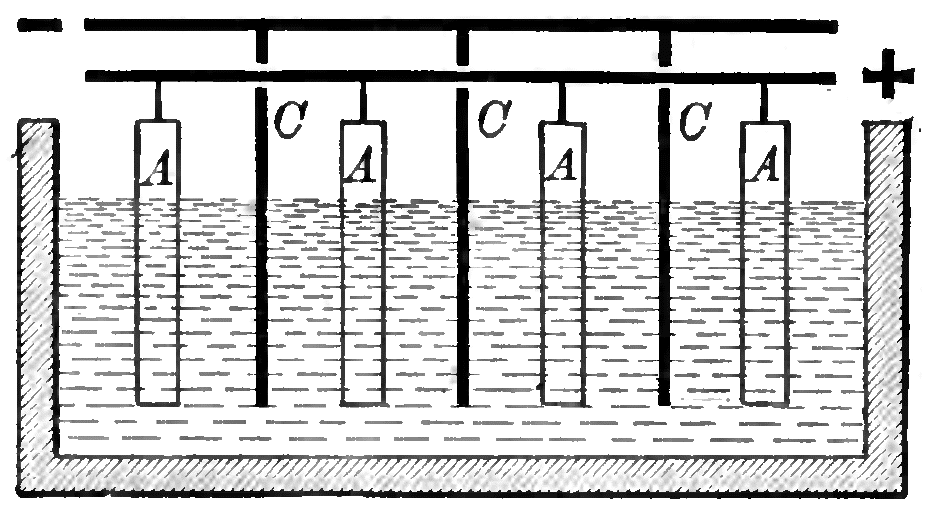
Apparatus for electrolytic refining of copper

Most metal ores contain metals of interest (e.g. gold, copper, nickel) in some oxidized states and thus the goal of most metallurgical operations is to chemically reduce them to their pure metallic form. The question is how to convert highly impure metal ores into purified bulk metals. A vast array of operations have been developed to accomplish those tasks, one of which is electrowinning. In an ideal case, ore is extracted into a solution which is then subjected to electrolysis. The metal is deposited on the cathode. In a practical sense, this idealized process is complicated by some or all of the following considerations: the metal content is low (a few percent is typical), other metals deposit competitively with the desired one, the ore is not easily or efficiently dissolved. For these reasons, electrowinning is usually only used on purified solutions of a desired metal, e.g. cyanide-extracts of gold ores.

Because metal deposition rates are related to available surface area, maintaining properly working cathodes is important. Two cathode types exist, flat-plate and reticulated cathodes, each with its own advantages and disadvantages. Flat-plate cathodes can be cleaned and reused, and plated metals recovered by either mechanically scraping the cathode (or, if the electrolyzed metal has a lower melting point than the cathode, heating the cathode to the electrolyzed metal's melting point causing the electrolyzed metal to liquify and separate from the cathode, which remains solid). Reticulated cathodes have a much higher deposition rate compared to flat-plate cathodes due to their greater surface area. However, reticulated cathodes are not reusable and must be sent off for recycling. Alternatively, starter cathodes of pre-refined metals can be used, which become an integral part of the finished metal ready for rolling or further processing.

== See also ==
- Electrochemical engineering
- Direct Air Electrowinning
