= Herold Jansson =

Danish artistic gymnast

- Full name: Carl August Herold Jansson
- Born: 13 November 1899 Copenhagen, Denmark
- Died: 23 April 1965 (aged 65) Frederiksberg, Denmark

Gymnastics career
- Discipline: Men's artistic gymnastics
- Country represented: Denmark
Medal record
Men's artistic gymnastics
Representing Denmark
Olympic Games
Gold medal – first place	1920 Antwerp	Team, free system

Carl August Herold Jansson (13 November 1899 – 23 April 1965) was a Danish gymnast and diver who competed in the 1920 Summer Olympics and in the 1924 Summer Olympics. He was born in Copenhagen and died in Frederiksberg.

Jansson was part of the Danish team that won the gold medal in the gymnastics men's team, free system event in 1920. He also competed in the plain high diving competition and finished sixth. Four years later, he was eliminated in the first round of the 1924 plain high diving event.
