= Paul Knuchel =

Swiss diver

Personal information
- Nationality: Swiss

Sport
- Sport: Diving

Paul Knuchel was a Swiss diver. He competed in the men's 3 metre springboard event at the 1920 Summer Olympics.
