= Louis Kuehn =

American diver (1901–1981)

- Keuhn in his youth, at the 1920 Olympics

Personal information
- Nationality: USA
- Born: April 2, 1901 Portland, Oregon, United States
- Died: March 30, 1981 (aged 79) West Linn, Oregon, United States
- Education: Northwestern University (Law)
- Occupations: Attorney; District Court Clerk

Sport
- Sport: Diving
- Event: Springboard Diving
- College team: Oklahoma State University
- Club: Multinomah Athletic Club
- Coached by: Jack Cody (Multinomah)
Medal record
Representing the United States
Olympic Games
Gold medal – first place	1920 Antwerp	3 m springboard

Louis Edward "Hap" Kuehn (April 2, 1901 – March 30, 1981) was an American diver who competed for Oklahoma State University and participated in the 1920 Summer Olympics where he won a gold medal in springboard diving.

Lois Edward Kuehn was born April 2, 1901 in greater Portland, Oregon to German immigrant Louis Kuehn and Dorothea Schaeffer Kuehn. By 18, he competed in swimming and diving with the strong program at the Portland's Multinomah Club where he was coached by Jack Cody, an International Swimming Hall of Fame inductee.

Kuehn was twice a state diving champion before capturing the national Junior championship in 1919 prior to attending the Olympics. Kuehn finished second at the 1920 AAU Diving Championships.

== Oregon State University ==
After the Olympics, he attended Oregon State University, graduating in 1926, at the time known as Oregon Agricultural College in Corvallis, Oregon. At Oregon State, he competed with their swimming and diving team and served as a student coach. Fellow American 1920 diving Olympian and medalist Clarence Pinkston also attended Oregon Agricultural College in 1920-21.

== 1920 Olympics ==
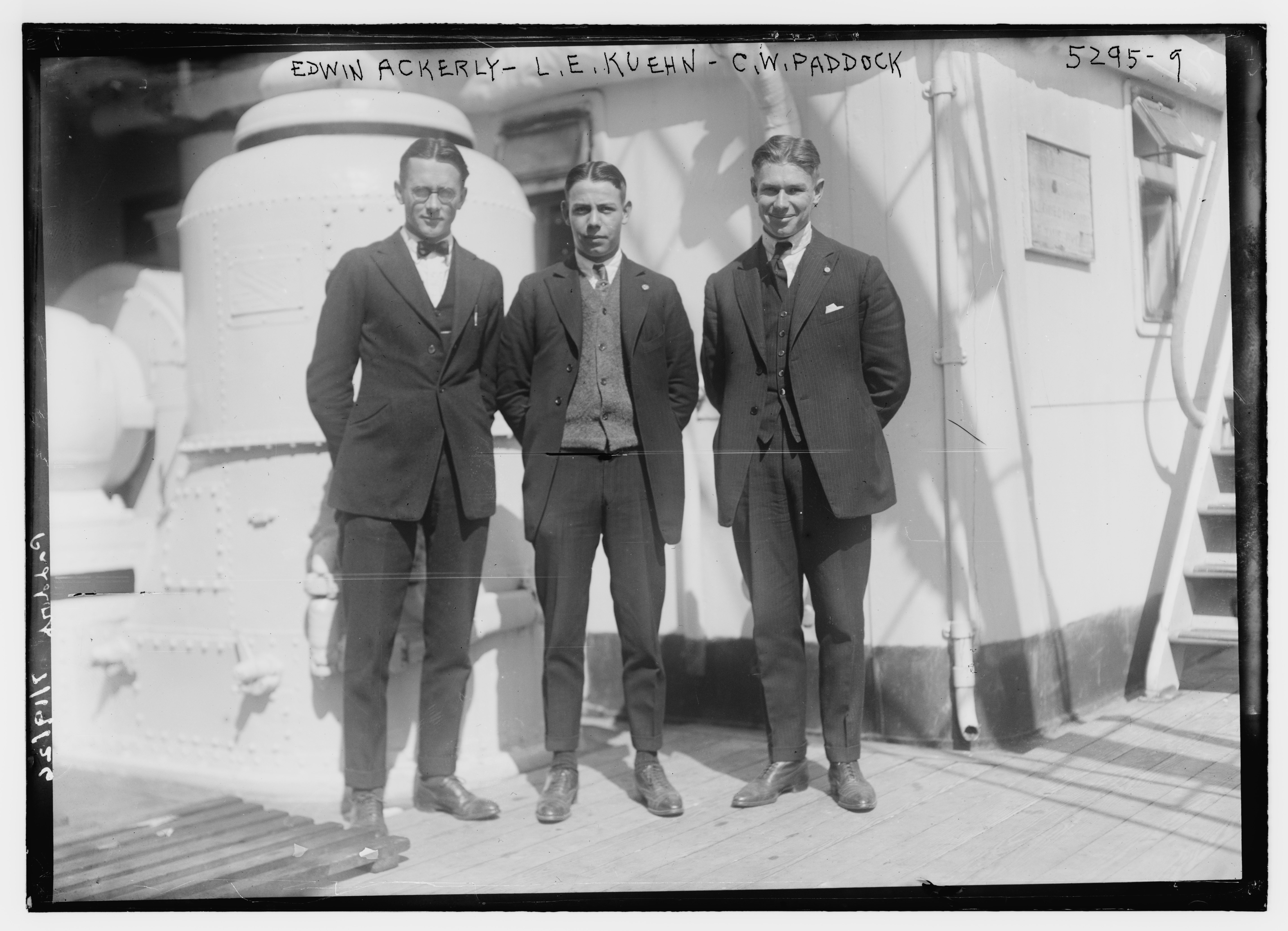
Kuehn in Center, wrestler Edwin Ackerly left, track gold medalist C.W. "Charley" Paddock right at 1920 Olympics

Kuehn's trip to the Olympic trials were funded by his father Louis.At the 1920 Antwerp Olympics, Kuehn won the gold medal in the 3 m springboard, under Head Olympic Swimming Coach Bill Bachrach of the Illinois Athletic Club. Kuehn became the first American to win the Olympic springboard title. The 1920 springboard competition included competition on both the 1 and 3 metre springboard. The springboard competition that year in Antwerp had compulsory dives that included a forward dive, hand on sides on entry, a back dive with half-twist, a forward running 1½ pike, an inward somersault pike a reverse dive, in layout position, and a reverse dive, in pike position, with hands on side at entry.

The Americans swept the medals with Stanford diver Clarence Pinkston taking the silver and Louis Balbach taking the bronze. Kuehn had previously placed second to Pinkston at the 1920 AAU Diving Championship, but placed ahead of him in the Olympic competition.

Kuehn served in the Second World War, as a Naval swimming and diving instructor. He trained and competed with the Navy diving team during his service.

=== Legal career ===
After acquiring a law degree from Northwestern University, he practiced law in Oregon. For 30 years, he served as a Multnomah County District court clerk.

Kuehn died March 30, 1981 at a nursing home in Portland, Oregon at the age of 79. He was survived by his wife Frieda Wigrield Kuehn, a sister and a nephew. Funeral services were held April 3 by Finley-Sunset Hills Chapel on Sunset Highway.

=== Honors ===
Kuehn became a member of the International Swimming Hall of Fame as a pioneer diver, and is also a member of the Oregon Sports Hall of Fame.

== See also ==
- List of members of the International Swimming Hall of Fame
