= Nils Skoglund =

Swedish diver (1906–1980)

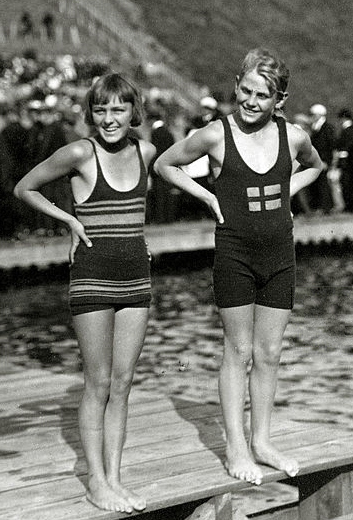
- Aileen Riggin and Nils Skoglund at the 1920 Olympics. Both won medals in diving aged 14

Personal information
- Born: 15 August 1906 Stockholm, Sweden
- Died: 1 January 1980 (aged 73) Stockholm, Sweden

Sport
- Sport: Diving
- Club: Stockholms KK
Medal record
Representing Sweden
Olympic Games
Silver medal – second place	1920 Antwerp	Plain high diving

Nils "Niklas" Skoglund (15 August 1906 – 1 January 1980) was a Swedish diver who won the silver medal in the plain high diving competition at the 1920 Summer Olympics. He still remains the youngest male Olympian to win a medal in an individual event, at 14 years, 11 days.

After the Olympics Skoglund retired from diving and played water polo for his club Stockholms KK. His elder brother Erik competed in swimming at the 1924 Summer Olympics, and the other brother Gunnar was a film actor.
