= François Winnepenninckx =

Belgian footballer

Personal information
- Date of birth: 26 March 1919
- Date of death: 15 October 1988 (aged 69)

International career
Years	Team	Apps	(Gls)
1939	Belgium	1	(0)

François Winnepenninckx (26 March 1919 – 15 October 1988) was a Belgian footballer. He played in one match for the Belgium national football team in 1939.
