= Yngve Johnson =

Swedish diver

Personal information
- Born: 3 August 1895 Västervik, Kalmar Municipality, Sweden
- Died: 3 July 1949 (aged 53) Eskilstuna, Sweden

Sport
- Sport: Diving

Sköld Yngve Johnson (3 August 1895 – 3 July 1949) was a Swedish diver who competed in the 1920 Summer Olympics. He was born in Västervik, Kalmar Municipality and died in Eskilstuna. In 1920 he finished fifth the 10 metre platform event.
