= Richard Beauchamp (diver) =

American diver

Personal information
- Nationality: American
- Born: April 8, 1901 Leavenworth, Kansas, United States
- Died: June 30, 1975 (aged 74) Weston, Missouri, United States

Sport
- Sport: Diving

Richard Beauchamp (April 8, 1901 – June 30, 1975) was an American diver. He competed in the men's plain high diving event at the 1920 Summer Olympics.
