= John Balbach =

German-born American settler, civic leader (1820–1896)

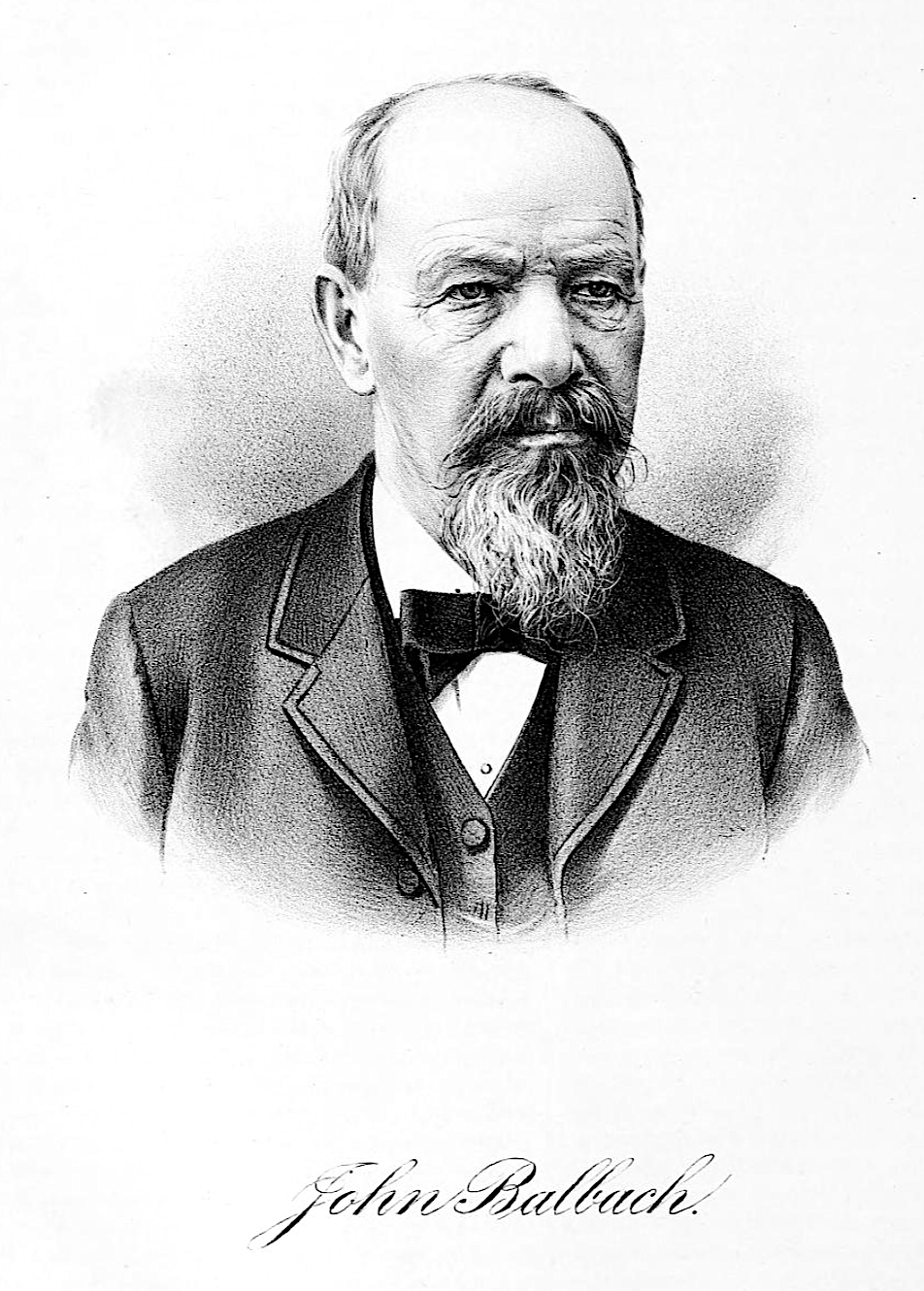
John Balbach, c. 1888

John Balbach (February 13, 1820 – August 4, 1896) was a German-born American pioneering settler and prominent citizen of San Jose, California. As a blacksmith, he made the first commercially available metal plow on the West Coast, in 1852. Balbach was a founder of the San Jose Volunteer Fire Department, he served on the San Jose City Council, and was a member of the Board of School Trustees.

"Balbach Street" in Downtown San Jose is named in his honor. Balbach has two commemorative plaques in the city: one installed by the Germania Verein (Club) on its 150th anniversary in 2006, and one by the larger German-American community, on South Market Street where his blacksmith shop was once located.

== Biography ==
Balbach was born on February 13, 1820, in Mergentheim, Baden-Württemberg, Kingdom of Württemberg (now Germany), a few miles south of the village of Unterbalbach.

He arrived in New York in 1848, part of the wave of immigrants caught up in the California Gold Rush. He went to Harrisburg, Owen County, Kentucky, where he obtained employment in a carriage factory. On March 28, 1849, he and nine others set out from Kentucky across the plains to California and the gold fields. They encountered many hardships on the trail and finally reached Los Angeles August 10, 1849. After recouping several months in Los Angeles, Balbach and two companions started northward following the coast. They reached San Jose in the early part of December, and went into camp for a few days. During the first night of their stay, Balbach's horse was stolen and he was compelled to abandon his trip and seek employment. After working a short time, he opened a blacksmith shop. In the spring of 1852 Balbach manufactured the first plow made on the Pacific Coast, and the following year he made over fifty plows. He established the Pioneer Carriage Manufactory, the first shop in San Jose where a carriage could be repaired or a new one built. It was on the corner of Second and Fountain Streets, and managed partly by three of his sons.

Balbach, on November 15, 1854, married Wenna Benner (1826–1905), a native of Germany, with whom he had six sons and three daughters. His children included John Theodore Balbach (1860–1899), George L. Balbach (1865–1929) and Louis Augusta Balbach (1868-1908). His grandson Louis James Balbach (1896–1943) was an American diver who competed in the 1920 Summer Olympics.

Balbach served two years on the San Jose City Council and five years as a member of the Board of School Trustees.

He died on August 4, 1896, at home at 523 South Market Street in San Jose. He had been ill for several months with heart affection and asthma.
