= Luther Burbank School District =

School district in San Jose, California, United States

Address
- 4 Wabash Avenue San Jose, California, 95128; United States

District information
- Type: Public
- Grades: K–8
- NCES District ID: 0623130

Students and staff
- Students: 475 (2020–2021)
- Teachers: 21.0 (FTE)
- Staff: 17.0 (FTE)
- Student–teacher ratio: 22.62:1

Other information
- Website: www.lbsd.k12.ca.us

The Luther Burbank School District is located in San Jose, California, USA.

== Elementary schools ==
- Luther Burbank Elementary School serves 440 students in kindergarten through grade eight, as well as 70 preschoolers. As of the 2020/2021 school year, 90 percent of the student body was Hispanic, 5 percent African American, and 5 percent Asians. 74 percent are English Language learners students.

The school program provides the following programs:

- Experienced Work Force
- High Expectations with Engaging Curriculum
- 12:1 adult ratio for grades K-3 for ELA and Math
- 15:1 adult ratio for grades 4-8 for ELA and Math
- Enrichment- Arts Wheel, Spanish, Maker Space, Computer Science/Coding, PE, Character/SEL
- Assemblies and Fieldtrips
- Intervention/ELD Specialist
- Counselors, Psychologist, Speech, OT
- 1:1 Technology Device for Home and School
- Free Wifi Access (in development)
- Free Breakfast, Lunch, Snack, and Supper
- Free After School Program
- Sports, Homework, STEM, Arts, Music
