= Joe Henke =

Australian rules footballer

Personal information
- Full name: Joseph John Henke
- Born: 25 June 1903; Bendigo, Victoria
- Died: 31 October 1988 (aged 85); Windsor, Victoria
- Height: 182 cm (6 ft 0 in)
- Weight: 79 kg (174 lb)

Playing career^{1}
Years	Club	Games (Goals)
1924	St Kilda	1 (0)
- ^{1} Playing statistics correct to the end of 1924.

Joseph John Henke (25 June 1903 – 31 October 1988) was an Australian rules footballer who played with St Kilda in the Victorian Football League (VFL).
