= Raymond Desonay =

Belgian diver

Personal information
- Nationality: Belgian
- Born: 6 December 1896

Sport
- Sport: Diving

Raymond Desonay (8 January 1899 – 20 January 1988) was a Belgian diver. He competed in the men's plain high diving event at the 1920 Summer Olympics.
