= Ivan More =

Australian rules footballer

Personal information
- Full name: Ivan More
- Born: 10 March 1897
- Died: 7 October 1988 (aged 91)

Playing career^{1}
| Years | Club | Games (Goals) |
| 1919 | Essendon | 2 (0) |
- ^{1} Playing statistics correct to the end of 1919.

Ivan More (10 March 1897 – 7 October 1988) was an Australian rules footballer who played with Essendon in the Victorian Football League (VFL).
