= Clarence Pinkston =

American diver (1900–1961)

- Pinkston in the "winged-O" Jersey of the Olympic club, circa late 1920's

Personal information
- Nationality: USA
- Born: February 1, 1900 Wichita, Kansas, United States
- Died: November 18, 1961 (aged 61) Detroit, Michigan, United States
- Occupations: Aquatics Coach and Director
- Spouse: Elizabeth Becker
- Children: 2

Sport
- Sport: Diving
- Events: 10 meter platform diving 3-meter springboard
- College team: Oregon State University (Oregon Agricultural); Stanford University
- Club: San Diego Rowing Club; Olympic Club, San Francisco
- Coached by: Ernst Brandsten (Stanford)
Medal record
Representing the United States
Olympic Games
Gold medal – first place	1920 Antwerp	10 metre platform
Silver medal – second place	1920 Antwerp	3 metre springboard
Bronze medal – third place	1924 Paris	3 metre springboard
Bronze medal – third place	1924 Paris	10 metre platform

Clarence Elmer "Bud" Pinkston (February 1, 1900 – November 18, 1961) was an American diver and coach who competed in 10-meter platform and 3-meter springboard diving in the 1920 Antwerp Olympics, and the 1924 Paris Olympics. He won two gold medals, and a silver medal in 1920, and two bronze medals in 1924. He had a distinguished career as a coach and aquatics director for the Detroit Athletic Club from 1927-1956 where he mentored several national champions and Olympic medalists.

Pinkston was born in Wichita, Kansas, on February 1, 1900, and after a family move, attended San Diego High. At the age of 15, in August, 1915, he captured an All-round Junior Gymnastics title at the Pacific Coast Championship in San Francisco, winning a gold medal and wreath as part of the Concordia Turnverein gymnasium, coached by Professor Robert Manzeck. He represent the San Diego Rowing Club, and later represented the strong program at the Olympic Club based in San Francisco. He later became the first San Diegan native to win an Olympic Gold Medal.

== Collegiate years ==
Pinkston took courses at Oregon State University where he attended the Oregon Agricultural College in Corvallis, Oregon for six months from December 1920, through 1921. At Oregon State, he participated in swimming and diving with fellow 1920 Olympic diver Louis Kuehn. He took most of his college studies at Stanford University where he competed in diving. Under the skilled tutelage of Stanford Coach Ernst Brandsten, Pinkston captured five consecutive AAU outdoor diving Championships beginning in 1920, as well as two championships in springboard diving with one in indoor diving and one in outdoor.

== Olympics ==
At the 1920 Olympic trials in Alameda, California, Pinkston won four out of five diving competitions, decisively defeated reigning diving champion Clyde Swendsen of the Los Angeles Athletic Club, and easily qualified to represent the U.S. team at the 1920 Antwerp Olympics.

=== 1920 Antwerp Olympics ===
As part of the U.S. Olympic team, Pinkston captured a gold medal at the late August, 1920 Antwerp Olympics, diving on the 10 metre platform. Pinkston was the pre-game favorite for the platform contest in 1920, having placed first in the AAU Championship that year. A total of 15 men qualified to compete in platform diving that year from seven countries. The compulsory platform dives consisted on an inward dive, a front handstand dive, a 1½ somersault dive from handstand position and a reverse dive in pike position. In Platform, Erik Adlerz of Sweden placed second with 10 points, and American Harry Prieste placed third with 16 points. Pinkston also won a silver medal diving on the 1 and 3 metre springboard, where the Americans swept the medals with Lou Kuehn winning the Gold, and Louis Balbach taking the bronze.

=== 1924 Paris Olympics ===
Pinkston won two bronze medals in the same two events at the mid-July 1924 Summer Olympics in Paris. Americans swept the medals in the 1924 springboard competition with Al White taking the gold, Pete Desjardins taking the silver, and Pinkston taking the bronze. In Platform diving in 1924, both the 5 and 10-meter platforms were used in competition. American Al White, who also won the springboard competition, took the gold, American Dave Fall took the silver medal, and Pinkston took the bronze.

=== Marriage ===
Pinkston met Elizabeth "Betty" Becker at the 1924 Games; they later married, and Pinkston became her coach, leading her to win a second gold medal at the 1928 Olympics.

Both he and his wife Betty were supporters of the swimming and diving program at the Detroit Athletic Club. Pinkston served as aquatics director for the D.A.C. from 1927 until 1956. He continued as a coach for the club until his death in 1961. Several national champions and Olympic medalists trained under Pinkston's tutelage; Richard Degener, Jeanne Stunyo and Barbara Sue Gilders - all were sponsored by the Detroit Athletic Club. Pinkston also coached Clark Sholes, a 1952 Olympic 100-meter freestyle medal winner.

Pinkston's coaching theory focused on spending time with his athletes, believing that an athlete's ability to perform can best be achieved by spending time and focus on building their skills, known as the "one swimmer, one coach" theory.

Pinkston died November 18, 1961 at Women's Hospital in Detroit as a result of complications from a virus and a thrombosis. He was survived by his widow Elizabeth, an Olympic Diving Champion in 1920 and 1924, a son, Clarence, and a daughter.

== See also ==
- List of members of the International Swimming Hall of Fame
- Diving at the 1920 Summer Olympics
- Diving at the 1924 Summer Olympics
