= Ted Larsen (Australian footballer) =

Australian rules footballer (1923–1988)

Personal information
- Full name: Ted Larsen
- Born: 19 July 1923
- Died: 28 October 1988 (aged 65)
- Height: 185 cm (6 ft 1 in)
- Weight: 101 kg (223 lb)
- Position: Ruck

Playing career^{1}
| Years | Club | Games (Goals) |
| 1946, 1948–49, 1952–54 | North Melbourne | 72 (0) |
- ^{1} Playing statistics correct to the end of 1954.

Ted Larsen (19 July 1923 – 28 October 1988) was an Australian rules footballer who played with North Melbourne in the Victorian Football League (VFL).
