= Jim Young (footballer) =

Australian rules footballer

Personal information
- Full name: James Simpson Young
- Born: 27 November 1921; Hamilton, Victoria
- Died: 1 October 1988 (aged 66); Cavendish, Victoria
- Original team: Orford
- Height: 191 cm (6 ft 3 in)
- Weight: 101 kg (223 lb)

Playing career^{1}
Years	Club	Games (Goals)
1945	Geelong	2 (2)
- ^{1} Playing statistics correct to the end of 1945.

James Simpson Young (27 November 1921 – 1 October 1988) was an Australian rules footballer. He played for the Geelong Football Club in 1945, appearing in two games and scoring two goals.
