= Balbach Smelting & Refining Company =

Coordinates: 40°43′55″N 74°9′9″W

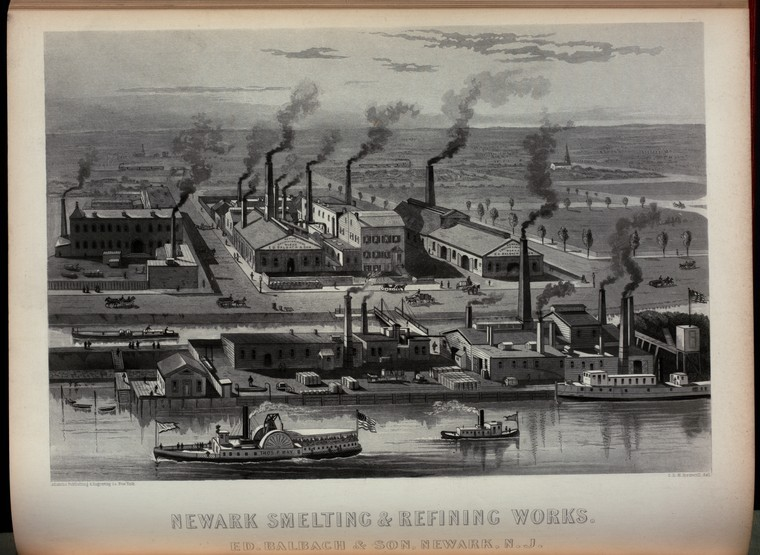
Balbach Smelting and Refining Company on the Passaic River, ca. 1870

Balbach Smelting & Refining Company (also known as Balbach and Sons Refining and Smelting Company) was a smelting plant in Newark, New Jersey operating in the late 19th and early 20th centuries. It was the first commercial electrolytic refinery in the United States, and until its closure in the 1920s, it was the second largest metal processing enterprise in the United States.

== History ==
The company president was Edward Balbach Jr., a metallurgist born in 1839 in Karlsruhe, Baden, Germany. He came to the United States in 1848 with his father Edward Balbach Sr. (1804–1890), who started the Balbach family fortune by collecting gold and silver dust from Newark jewelry shop floors, turning it into bullion. Balbach Sr. first came up with the idea of refining precious metals in Germany, but due to competition there decided to start a business in America. After visiting a number of cities he settled on Newark to start the new venture. In 1865, Edward Balbach Jr. patented the "Balbach Process" which separated gold and silver from lead, which in 1872 evolved into something closely resembling the Parkes process, which had been developed earlier (1850) in England. In 1881, the Balbachs began to manufacture copper, just in time for a boom in demand thanks to the invention of the telephone and shortly thereafter electricity. In 1883, the factory opened an electrolytic refinery for copper, the first electrolytic refinery in the United States. In December 1910, Edward Balbach Jr. died at the age of 72 and control of the company passed to his daughter Julia's husband Edward Randolph (1870–1919) who had been working there since 1898. In 1919, Edward Randolph died and in the 1920s the Balbach operation was closed by its directors in favor of facilities closer to where the ore was mined. The County purchased the factory and converted it to a baseball field, located at Riverbank Park.

Factory conditions were difficult. In the 1880s, workers earned $1.50 to $1.65 a day. (worth $54 to $59 today). It could also be dangerous, if water seeped into a boiler it turned to steam and could cause an explosion, spraying molten metal onto workers who, if not immobilized, were known to run into the Passaic River. The accidents were not limited to workers - in January 1881 a boiler exploded causing a flying brick to strike a sleeping guest in the head through a third floor window at the nearby Balbach family mansion.
