= Georgette Cohan =

American actress

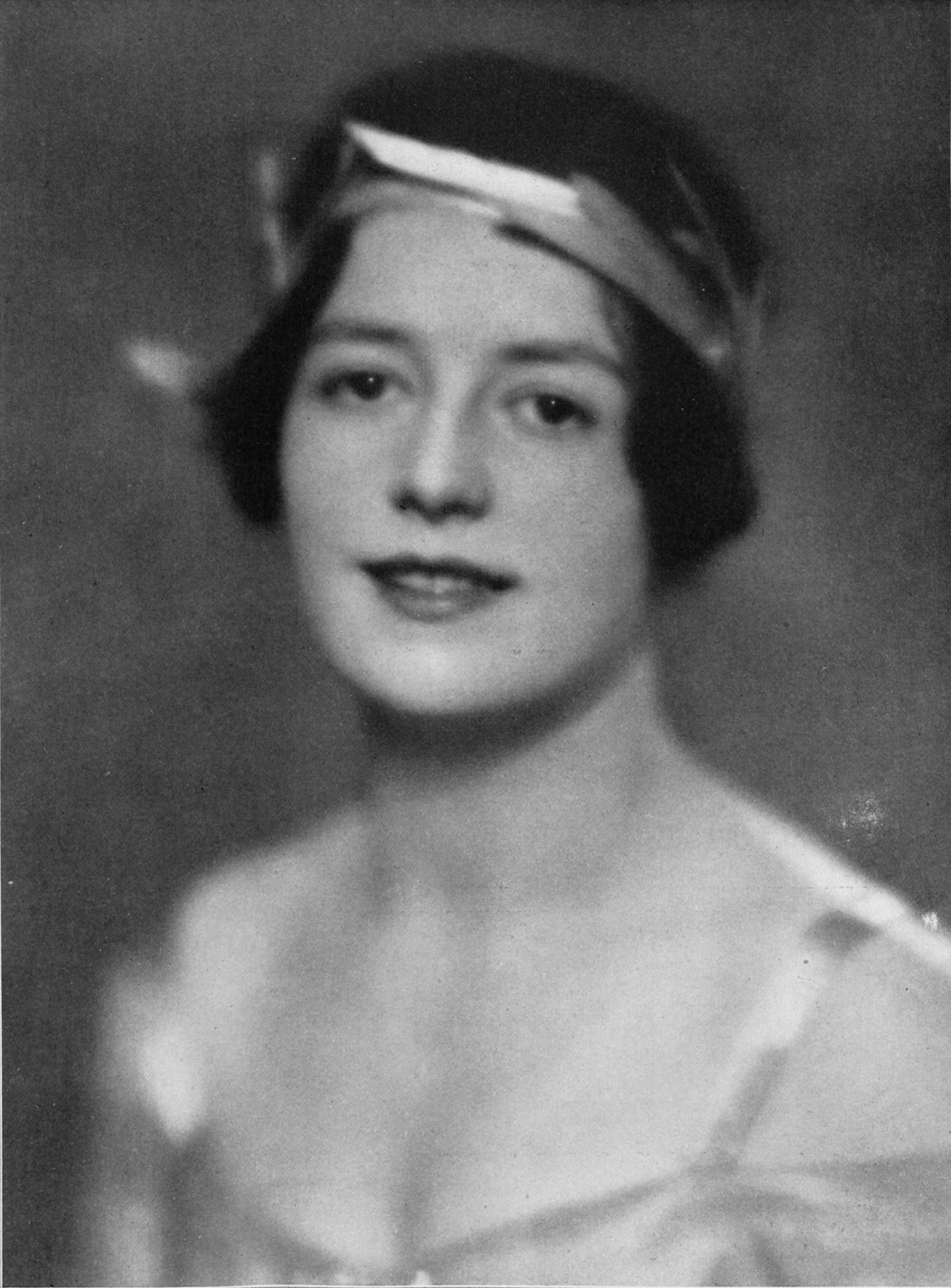
- Georgette Cohan, photographed by Nickolas Muray, from a 1920 issue of Harper's Bazaar
- Born: Georgia Ethelia Cohan; August 26, 1900; Los Angeles, California, U.S.
- Died: October 26, 1988 (aged 88)
- Other names: Georgette Souther, Georgette Rowse
- Occupation: Actress
- Parent(s): George M. Cohan, Ethel Levey
- Relatives: Mary Cohan Ronkin (half-sister), Helen Cohan Carola (half-sister)

Georgia Ethelia Cohan Souther Rowse (August 26, 1900 – October 26, 1988), known as Georgette Cohan, was an American actress, daughter of George M. Cohan and Ethel Levey. She played Peter Pan in London in 1919, and appeared in several Broadway productions.

== Early life ==
Georgette Cohan was the daughter of entertainers George M. Cohan and Ethel Levey. Her parents divorced in 1907, and both remarried. Her stepfather was aviator Claude Grahame-White, and her younger half-sisters were singer Mary Cohan and actress Helen Cohan. She was raised mainly in England and attended a boarding school in France. The National Portrait Gallery has three photos of her taken by Bassano in 1913, two of them with her mother.

== Career ==
Cohan started her stage career in England. She starred as Peter in a Christmastime revival of Peter Pan at the New Theatre in 1919. She also appeared with Leslie Howard in A. A. Milne's Mr. Pim Passes By, in Manchester in 1919 and in London in 1920. Her Broadway credits included a starring role in Madeleine and the Movies (1922), written by her father, and roles in Diplomacy (1928), and The Rivals (1930). "No all-star revival cast would be complete without the name of Georgette Cohan", commented one reporter in 1929.

== Personal life ==
Cohan married twice. Her first husband was businessman J. William Souther; they eloped in 1921, and he died from a ruptured appendix in 1925. Her second husband was widowed manufacturer William Hamilton Rowse; they married in 1926, and divorced in 1927. She died in 1988, aged 88 years. Her gravesite is in Woodlawn Cemetery in the Bronx. There is a collection of her photographs and memorabilia in the New York Public Library's Billy Rose Theatre Division.
