= Bill O'Brien (footballer, born 1905) =

Australian rules footballer

Personal information
- Full name: William O'Brien
- Born: 3 January 1905; Yarrawonga, Victoria
- Died: 24 October 1988 (aged 83); Caulfield South, Victoria
- Original team: South Melbourne CYMS (CYMSFA)
- Height: 163 cm (5 ft 4 in)
- Weight: 62 kg (137 lb)

Playing career^{1}
Years	Club	Games (Goals)
1930	South Melbourne	2 (0)
- ^{1} Playing statistics correct to the end of 1930.

Bill O'Brien (3 January 1905 – 24 October 1988) was an Australian rules footballer who played with South Melbourne in the Victorian Football League (VFL).

O'Brien later served in the Australian Army during World War II.

He is the grandfather of Gerard Healy and Greg Healy.
