= Harry Taylor (cricketer) =

English cricketer

Harry Taylor (18 December 1900 – 28 October 1988) was an English first-class cricketer, who played nine matches for Yorkshire County Cricket Club in 1924 and 1925. He also played for the Yorkshire Second XI from 1923 to 1926, and Minor Counties North in 1925.

Born in Idle, West Yorkshire, England, Taylor was a right-handed batsman, who scored 153 runs at 11.76, with a best of 36 against Essex. He took one catch in the field, but his right arm medium bowling was not called upon.

Taylor died in October 1988 in Bradford, Yorkshire.
