= Samuel Gordon (novelist) =

English novelist, short story writer and playwright

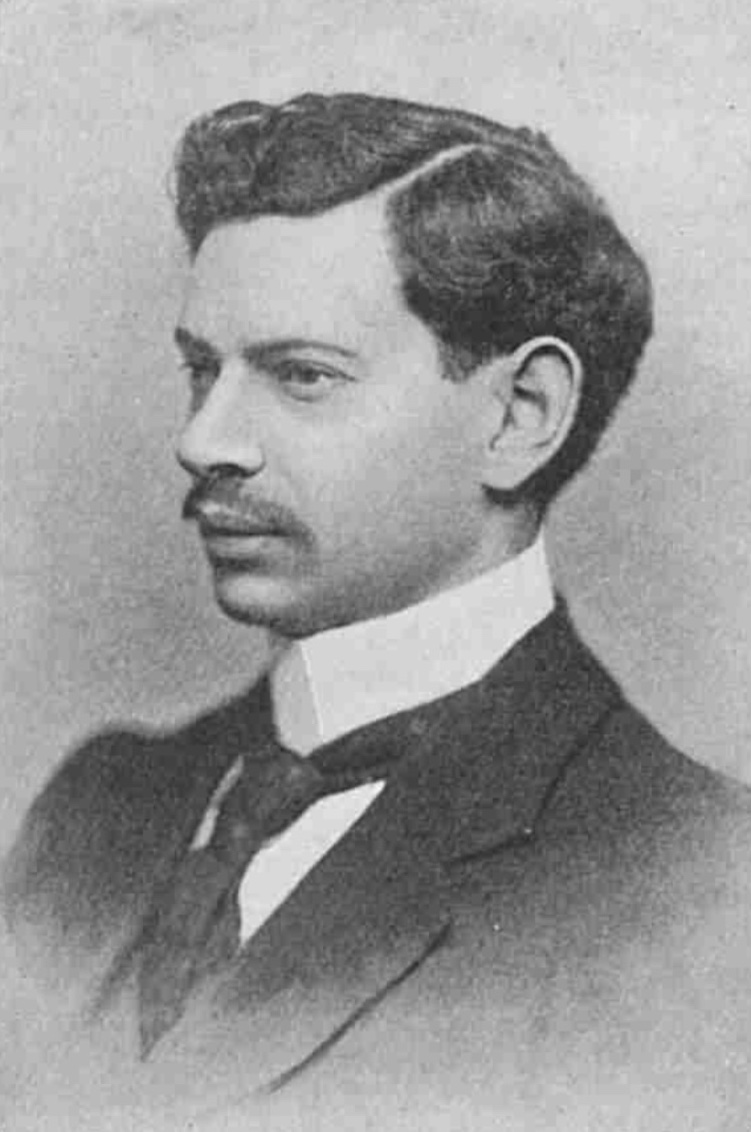
- Born: 10 September 1871; Buk, Posen, German Empire
- Died: 10 January 1927 (aged 55); Stoke Newington, London, United Kingdom
- Resting place: Willesden Jewish Cemetery
- Education: Queens' College, Cambridge
- Spouse: Esther Zichlin (m. 1907, divorced)
- Relatives: Annie Gertrude Gordon (sister); Phyllis Gordon Demarest (daughter)
- Writing career
- Notable work: Sons of the Covenant (1900)

Samuel Gordon (10 September 1871 – 10 January 1927) was an English novelist, short story writer, and playwright. His fiction largely focused on the lives of contemporary English and Russian Jews.

== Biography ==
Samuel Gordon was born in Buk, Province of Posen, to Jewish parents Bertha (née Pulver) and Rev. Abraham Elias Gordon. He went to England with his parents in 1883, where his father became cantor of the Great Synagogue of London. Gordon was educated at the City of London School, and read Classics at Queens' College, Cambridge, obtaining a Bachelor of Arts in 1893. He was appointed secretary of the Great Synagogue the following year.

Gordon published several novels and volumes of short stories, mainly dealing with Jewish life and character, among them A Handful of Exotics (1897), Daughters of Shem (1898), Lesser Destinies (1899), Strangers at the Gate (1902), God's Remnants (1916), and the historical romance The Lost Kingdom; or, the Passing of the Khazars (1926). In Years of Tradition (1897) and The New Galatea (1901) were his chief works outside Jewish lines. Gordon's most accomplished work was Sons of the Covenant: A Tale of London Jewry (1900), which portrays the lives of two newly-arrived Jewish immigrants to London's East End.

He travelled widely in Europe and lived briefly in the United States. As a journalist, Gordon covered the Fourth Zionist Congress in London for The Manchester Guardian in 1900. He later worked in the Censor's Office during the World War I.

=== Death ===
Gordon died on 10 January 1927 at the age of 55. A theatrical adaptation of Daughters of Shem was performed at the New Scala shortly after his death.

== Bibliography ==
- A Handful of Exotics: Scenes and Incidents Chiefly of Russo-Jewish Life. London: Methuen & Co. 1897. hdl:2027/uc2.ark:/13960/t48p5xm2c.
- In Years of Transition. Bliss, Sands & Co. 1897.
- A Tale of Two Rings: A Story of Episodes and Intervals. London: Raphael Tuck & Sons. 1898.
- Daughters of Shem, and Other Stories. London: Greenberg & Co. 1898.
- Lesser Destinies. Chicago and New York: Herbert S. Stone & Co. 1899.
- Sons of the Covenant: A Tale of London Jewry. Philadelphia: Jewish Publication Society of America. 1900.
- Strangers at the Gate. Philadelphia: Jewish Publication Society of America. 1902.
- The Queen's Quandary. London: Sands & Company. 1903.
- Unto Each Man His Own. London: William Heinemann. 1904. hdl:2027/hvd.hw5iws.
- The Ferry of Fate: A Tale of Russian Jewry. London: Chatto & Windus. 1906. hdl:2027/osu.32435008487720.
- The New Galatea. London: Greening & Co. 1908.
- God's Remnants: Stories of Israel Among the Nations. New York: E. P. Dutton & Co. 1916.
- The Avenger. New York: The Macaulay Company. 1921.
- The Second Flowering. New York: The Macaulay Company. 1922.
- The Lost Kingdom; or, the Passing of the Khazars. London: Shapiro, Valentine and Co. 1926.
