= Hal Haig Prieste =

Armenian-American athletic diver (1896–2001)

Hal Haig Prieste (Keshishian)
- Hal Prieste, holding the original Olympic "Antwerp" Flag

Personal information
- Nickname: Harry
- National team: United States
- Born: Haig Prieste; November 23, 1896 Fresno, California
- Died: April 19, 2001 (aged 104) Camden, New Jersey
- Resting place: Inglewood Park Cemetery
- Occupations: Athlete, stunt man
- Height: 5 ft 2 in (157 cm)

Sport
- Country: United States
- Sport: Diving
- Club: Illinois Athletic Club
Medal record
Representing United States
Men's Diving
Bronze medal – third place	1920 Antwerp	10 metre platform

Hal Haig "Harry" Prieste (November 23, 1896 – April 19, 2001) was an American athlete who participated in the 1920 Summer Olympics in Antwerp as a diver.

== Biography ==
He was born Haig Prieste in Fresno, California, to Armenian immigrant parents. Their original surname was Keshishian. "Haig" is the name of the progenitor of the Armenians. Prieste first took "Harry" as his American name, but later switched to "Hal."

He won a bronze medal in platform diving as a member of the 1920 US Olympic team. He also competed in the 1920 plain high diving event, but he was eliminated in the first round.

He is known for taking the original five-interlocking-ring Olympic flag as a prank at the 1920 Summer Olympics hosted by the city of Antwerp, Belgium. At the end of the Games, the flag could not be found. In 1997, at a banquet hosted by the US Olympic Committee, a reporter was interviewing him and the reporter mentioned that the IOC had not been able to find out what had happened to the original Olympic flag. "I can help you with that," Prieste said matter-of-factly; "it's in my suitcase." At the end of the Antwerp Olympics, spurred on by team-mate Duke Kahanamoku, he climbed a flagpole and stole the Olympic flag. For 77 years the flag was stored away in the bottom of his suitcase. The flag was returned to the IOC by Prieste, by then 103 years old, in a special ceremony held at the 2000 Summer Olympics in Sydney. At the handover, IOC president Juan Antonio Samaranch gave him a commemorative Olympic medal in a box, to which the hard-of-hearing Prieste responded, "What is it? Kleenex?" The Antwerp Olympic Flag is now on display at the Olympic Museum in Lausanne, Switzerland, with a plaque thanking him for donating it.

At the time of his death at 104, Prieste was the world's oldest former Olympic medalist, and the first known Olympian whose lifespan covered three centuries (1896–2001).
