= Erik Skoglund (swimmer) =

Swedish swimmer

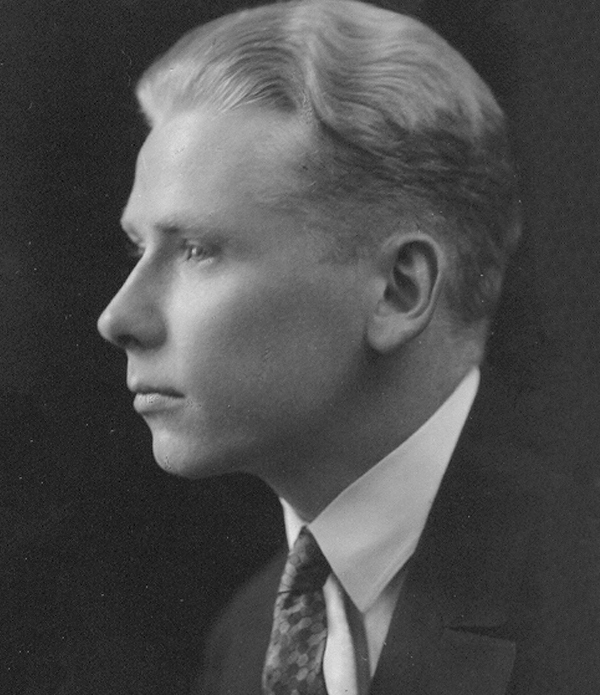

Personal information
- Born: 1 October 1903 Stockholm, Sweden
- Died: 22 February 1984 (aged 80) Stockholm, Sweden

Sport
- Sport: Swimming
- Strokes: Backstroke
- Club: Stockholms KK

Erik Skoglund (1 October 1903 – 22 February 1984) was a Swedish swimmer. He competed at the 1924 Summer Olympics in the 100 m backstroke, but failed to reach the final. His younger brother Nils was an Olympic diver.
