= Guglielmo De Sanctis (diver) =

Italian diver

Personal information
- Nationality: Italian
- Born: 1897 Trieste, Italy

Sport
- Sport: Diving

Guglielmo De Sanctis (born 1897, date of death unknown) was an Italian diver. He competed in two events at the 1920 Summer Olympics.
