= Paul Köhler =

Danish diver

Personal information
- Full name: Paul Georg Daniel Köhler
- Nationality: Danish
- Born: 31 August 1895; Copenhagen, Denmark
- Died: 17 December 1969 (aged 74); Copenhagen, Denmark

Sport
- Sport: Diving

Paul Georg Daniel Köhler (31 August 1895 – 17 December 1969) was a Danish diver. He competed in the men's 10 metre springboard event at the 1920 Summer Olympics.
