= Lauri Kyöstilä =

Finnish diver

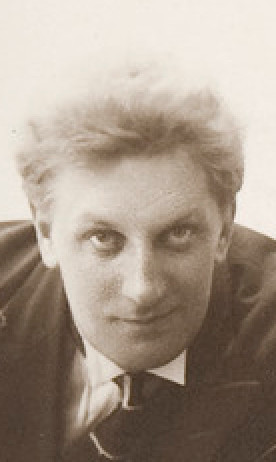

Personal information
- Born: May 7, 1896; Helsinki, Finland
- Died: September 23, 1984 (aged 88); Helsinki, Finland

Sport
- Sport: Diving

Lauri Viljo Kyöstilä (7 May 1896 – 23 September 1984) was a Finnish diver who competed in the 1920 Summer Olympics and 1924 Summer Olympics in the platform event.
