= Tatapuram Sukumaran =

Indian writer

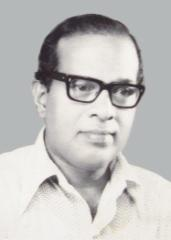
- Born: 22 October 1923; Kaloor, Kochi
- Died: 26 October 1988 (aged 65)
- Occupation: Writer

Tatapuram Sukumaran (22 October 1923 – 26 October 1988) was a Malayalam writer, born in Kaloor, Kochi, Kerala, India.

Son of Naduviledath Ayyappan and V.V. Janaki, he joined Tata Oil Mills Company, Kochi in 1941 and retired as the Public Relations Officer.

== Writing ==
Sukumaran has to his credit over 80 books in the field of short stories, novels, travelogues, juvenile literature, drama, and translations. His stories have been translated to many Indian languages and English. He has won the Kerala Sahitya Academy Award for his short story collection Payasam and won National Award for his books, Manushyante Atmakadha and Nammude Bharana Chakram. He is also the recipient of Soviet Land Nehru Award for his book Raktha Nakshtrangalude Nattil. He was one of the pioneers in the literary genre of Malayalam short stories.

He has extensively traveled many parts of the world and published travelogues such as Pathinonnu European Nadukalil (Eleven European countries), Singapore Yathra Chitrangal, Nayagrayude Nattil, African Poorva Desangalil. He also wrote the screenplay for the film Janmabhumi, for which won the President's award.

== Positions held ==
He was the executive committee member of Kerala Sahithya Academy, Sahithya Pravarthaka Sahakarana Sangham (SPCS) and Authors Guild of India. He was the Senate member of Kochi University and was also acclaimed as the advisor of Kerala Sahithya Parishath. He Was the Vice President of Eranakulam Public Library, and Secretary of Institute of Kerala Studies.

He attended the World Malayalee Conference at Washington in the year 1985.

He was a good orator in English and Malayalam and have spoken over 3000 stages in Kerala and different parts of India. He was the editor of 'Kalarangom' a house magazine of Tata Oil Mills Co., and permanent secretary of 'Tatapuram Kalasamithy'.

A trust was formed in the honour of the great writer's name in 1998. A publication ('Nammalariyunna Tatapuram') released in this commemoration includes articles written by leading Malayalam writers like ONV Kurup, Prof. S. Guptan Nair, Prof. M.K. Sanu, C. Radhakrishnan, etc., is a fitting tribute to his valuable contributions to Malayalam literature.

== Family ==
He married Akkipadikkal Gomathy in 1944. His sons are K.S. Radhakrishnan, K.S. Jayaprakash, S.Bhagyanath and S. Harikumar. He also has a daughter, S. Roopalekha, and son-in-law, Rajagopalan Pullanikkatil.

== Death ==
He died at Cochin in a private nursing home, on 26 October 1988 after a brief illness.

== Notable works ==
=== Short Story collections ===
Paayasam, Ormathettukal, Thaavalam, Theranjedutha Kadhakal, Midhunachoodu, Alamalakalil, Neerchuzhi, Thakkol Koottam, Vandikal Neengunnu, Karuutha Njaayaraazhcha, Orila Kozhiyunnu, Idavela, Avalku chuttum Kadal, Kochu dukham, Mazha, Oru Chitravum Randu Kathukalum, Kadal Manushyan, Happy Birthday.

=== Novels ===
Athani, Kairekha, Kochi Kayal, Chuttika, Prakasavalayam, Sumalini

=== Juvenile literature ===
Oru Pencil Konduvaroo, Manushyante Atmakadha, Kuttanum Soppum, Kadha Parayunna Bharatham, Kochu Thoppikkary, Kochu Kathkal, Mandante Manavatty, Kadalipazhangal, Vidhavayude Makan, Mrigasikshakan

=== Drama ===
Homakundam, Kadal Edukkunnu - Kadal Veikkunnu

=== Pencil sketches ===
Pathu Kadhakaranmar, Pathu Kavikal, Pathu Gadhyakaranmar

=== Translations ===
Kalyana Rathri, Vellimullukal, Jwalayum Poovum, Chekuthan, Manushyarum Nadikalum, Mercina, Novel Sangrahangal, Ezhu Bharatheeya Novalukal, Atma Kadhayiloode, Kutta Sammatham, Ammayum Kamukiyum, Maranathinte Maravil, Japan Annum Innum, Indian Nadodi Nrithangal, Katari Pidicha Kai, Gold Finger, Thunder Ball, Darpana, Seven Summers, Adhunika Lokathile Adbhutha Oushadangal

=== Travelogues ===
Pathinonnu European Nadukalyil, Rathnam Vilayunna Nattil, Kattilum Malayilum Koode Oru Yathra, Raktha Nakshthrangalude Nattil, Singapore Yathra Chitrangal, African Poorvadesangalil, Manassiloode Oru Madakka Yathra
