= Oscar Dose =

Swedish diver

Personal information
- Nationality: Swedish
- Born: 29 March 1901; Gothenburg, Sweden
- Died: 13 October 1988 (aged 87); Seattle, Washington, United States

Sport
- Sport: Diving

Oscar Dose (29 March 1901 – 13 October 1988) was a Swedish diver. He competed in the men's 3 metre springboard event at the 1920 Summer Olympics.
