= Susanne Wetteskog =

Swedish diver

Personal information
- Nationality: Swedish
- Born: 13 July 1958 (age 66); Gothenburg, Sweden

Sport
- Sport: Diving

Susanne Wetteskog (born 13 July 1958) is a Swedish former diver. She competed at the 1976 Summer Olympics and the 1980 Summer Olympics.
