= Louis Balbach =

American diver (1896–1943)

Personal information
- Born: May 23, 1896 San Jose, California, United States
- Died: October 11, 1943 (aged 47) Portland, Oregon, United States

Sport
- Sport: Diving
Medal record
Representing United States
Olympic Games
Bronze medal – third place	1920 Antwerp	3 m springboard

Louis James Balbach (May 23, 1896 – October 11, 1943) was an American diver who won a bronze medal in the 1920 Summer Olympics.

He was the son of Louis Augusta Balbach (1868-1908) and Nettie Viola (Bonar) Balbach (1873-1958) and grandson of pioneer California settler John Balbach.

Louis James Balbach was a well-known swimmer and diver in the Portland area, doing well in many competitions. He first came to national prominence as a teenager after winning the diving competition at the 1915 San Francisco World's Fair. He won an athletic scholarship to Columbia College (of Columbia University, New York), with whose team he went to the 1920 Summer Olympics in Antwerp. He won the bronze medal in the 3 m springboard competition. He finished sixth in the 10 metre platform event. He graduated in 1921 with a Bachelor of Arts. He went on to practice law in Portland.
