= Samuel Dickey Gordon =

American evangelical lay minister and devotional author

Samuel Dickey Gordon (August 12, 1859 – June 1936) was a prolific author and evangelical lay minister active in the latter part of the 19th and early 20th centuries.

Born in Philadelphia, he served as assistant secretary of the Philadelphia Young Men's Christian Association (YMCA) in 1884-86 and then became state secretary for the YMCA in Ohio, serving from 1886 to 1895.

He is perhaps best known for his series of books "Quiet Talks on ...", published from 1903 onwards, which have their own unique style very much different to that of other writers of the day.

== Works ==
- Quiet Talks on Power (1903)
- Quiet Talks on Prayer (1904)
- Quiet Talks about Jesus (1906)
- Quiet Talks on Service (1906)
- Quiet Talks on Personal Problems (1907)
- Quiet Talks with World Winners (1908)
- Quiet Talks on Home Ideals (1909), written in conjunction with Mary Kilgore Gordon, "in response to letters received asking for helpful literature on the subject of home life".
- Quiet Talks about the Tempter (1910)
- Quiet Talks with Workers (1910)
- Prayer Changes Things (1910)
- Quiet Talks about Calvary (1911)
- Quiet Talks about Our Lord's Return (1912)
- Quiet Talks on Following the Christ (1913)
- Quiet Talks on the Crowned Christ of Revelation (1914)
- Quiet Talks on John's Gospel (1915)
- Quiet Talks about the Babe of Bethlehem (1915)
- Quiet Talks with Those Who Weep (1915)
- Quiet Talks on Life After Death (1920)
- Quiet Talks about the Healing Christ (1924)
- Quiet talks about simple essentials and the present world outlook (1924)
- Quiet talks on the crisis and after (1926)
- Quiet Talks on How to Pray (1929)
- Quiet talks on the Bible story (1930)
- Quiet talks on difficult questions (1931)
- In the Quiet Corner (1932)
- Quiet talks on the new order of things (1933)
- Quiet talks with eager youth (1935)
