= Frank Aloysius Mullen =

American diver

Frank Mullen
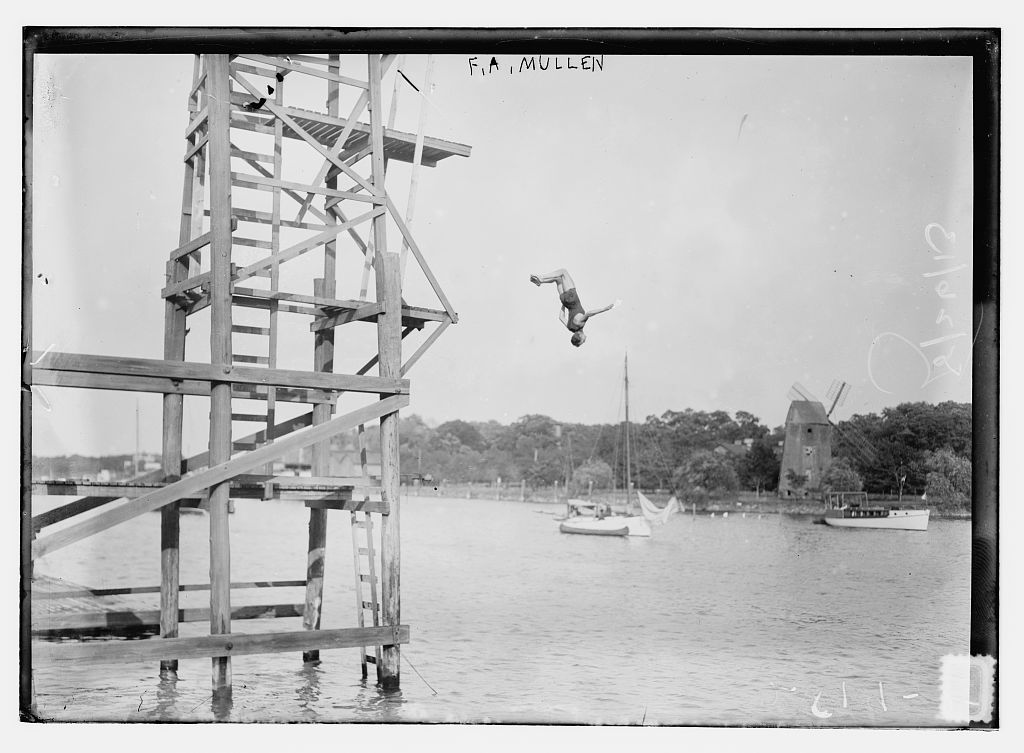
- Mullen on Travers Island, New York in 1912

Personal information
- Born: August 9, 1887; New York, New York, United States
- Died: September 27, 1945 (aged 58); Queens, New York, United States

Sport
- Sport: Diving

Frank Aloysius Mullen (August 9, 1887 – September 27, 1945) was a diver at the 1920 Summer Olympics in Antwerp.

== Personal life ==
Mullen served in the United States Marine Corps during World War I.
