= Richard Flint =

Canadian diver

Personal information
- Born: 14 November 1899; Toronto, Ontario, Canada
- Died: 24 September 1982 (aged 82); Toronto, Ontario, Canada

Sport
- Sport: Diving

Richard Arless Flint (14 November 1899 – 24 September 1982) was a Canadian diver. He competed in three events at the 1920 Summer Olympics.
