= West London Penguin Swimming and Water Polo Club =

Swimming and water polo club based in London

Club information
- Nickname(s): Penguin
- Short name: West London Penguin
- City: Hammersmith, London
- Founded: 1916 (women's); 1921 (men's); 1976 (merged)
- Home pool: Various

Swimming
- League: Swim England

Water Polo
- League: British Water Polo League; London Water Polo League

The West London Penguin Swimming and Water Polo Club is a British water polo and masters swimming Club with history dating back to 1916. It was formed in 1976 as the Hammersmith Penguin Swimming Club by the merger of the Hammersmith Ladies Swimming Club (founded 1916) and Penguin Swimming Club (1921). It states its date of foundation as 1921.

Founding members of the clubs included four-time Olympian and gold medallist Rob Derbyshire, who was later inducted into the International Swimming Hall of Fame, and his wife, Alice. For over fifty years, the clubs were organised separately for men and women; between them, they had more than 40 athletes who competed at the international level, including the Summer Olympic Games. The two clubs had several divers, including four-time Olympian Belle White, the first British diver to win an Olympic medal, and the first to win a European championship. Notable water polo players have included Francesca Snell, who competed for Team GB at the London 2012 Olympics, and Ron Turner, a two-time Olympian who helped Penguin win four of their seven National Water Polo Championship titles between 1926 and 1966, both as a player and as a coach. In addition, John Martin-Dye, who swam for Great Britain in the 1960 and 1964 Olympics, and won three bronze medals for England at two Commonwealth Games, also competed in water polo for Penguin in the National League.

The West London Penguin men's and women's water polo teams currently compete in the British Water Polo League and the London League, and train at the London Aquatics Centre in Stratford, as well as the Latymer Sports Centre in Hammersmith. The junior teams compete in the London Water Polo League, and train at Latymer and at Hillingdon Sports Centre. The masters swimmers train at multiple locations including Virgin Active Fulham Pools, St. Paul's School in Barnes, St. Paul's Girls' School at Bute House, and Latymer Sports Centre.

== History ==
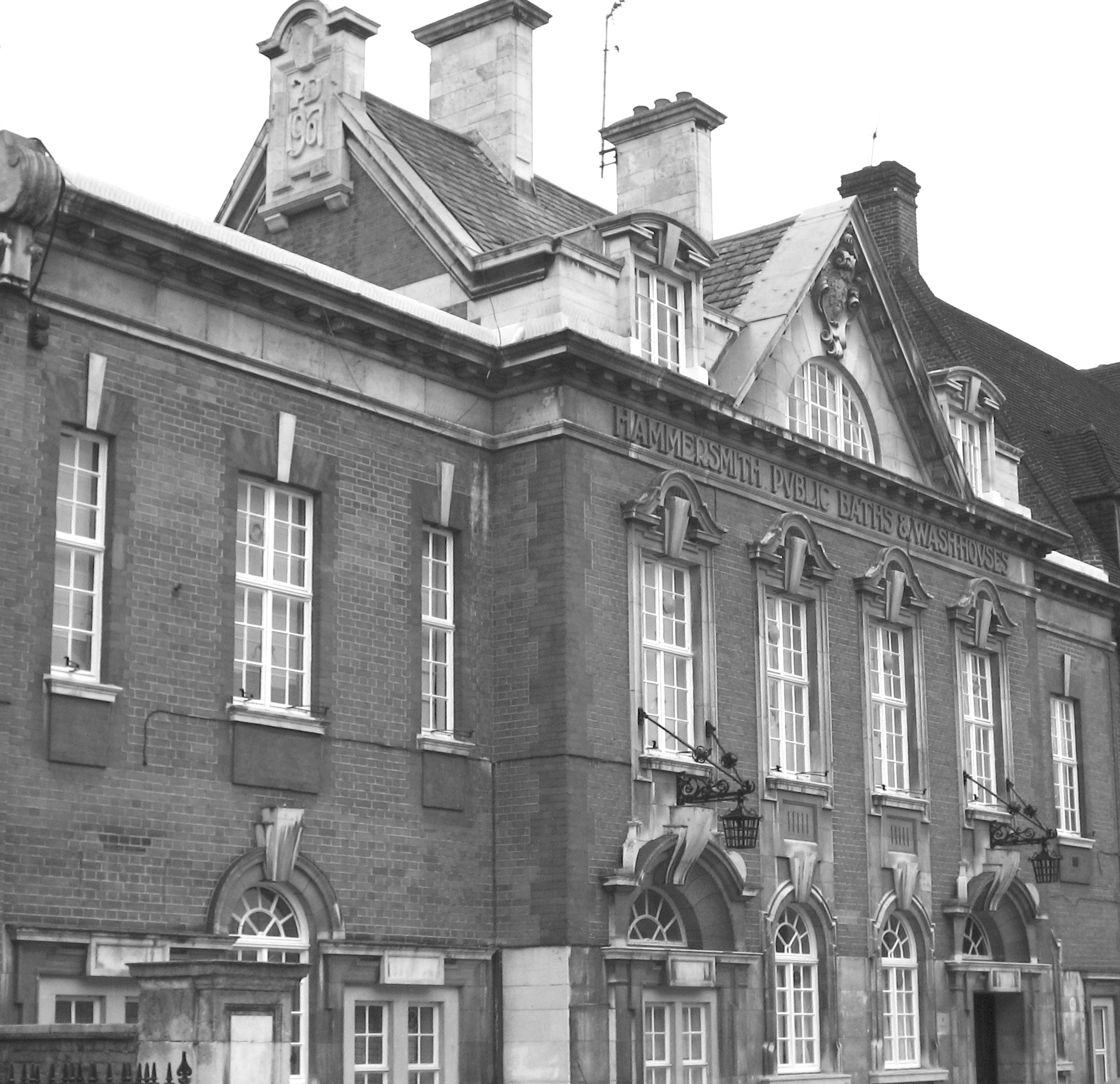
Lime Grove Baths, Hammersmith

With mixed-gender swimming clubs a rarity in the early 20th century, the Hammersmith Ladies Swimming Club and the Penguin Swimming Club co-existed for many years, training in and around Shepherd's Bush. The clubs were started at the Lime Grove Baths, where Rob Derbyshire started working as manager in 1910.

=== Hammersmith Ladies Swimming Club ===
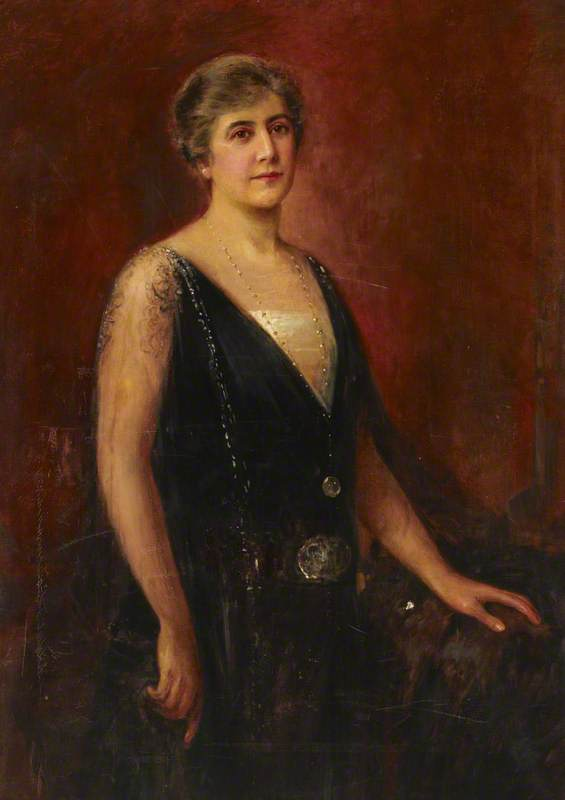
Lady Foreman, Wife of Sir Henry Foreman (Mayor) (unknown artist ), depicting Lucy Beatrice Foreman, founding president of Hammersmith Ladies Swimming Club

The Hammersmith Ladies Swimming Club was co-founded in 1916 by Alice Derbyshire, who served as its honorary secretary for nearly 30 years and as president from 1945 to 1975. In the early years, Mrs (later Lady) Lucy Beatrice Foreman (née Randall), the Mayoress (wife of the mayor) of Hammersmith, was the club's president.

The Hammersmith Ladies SC had several Olympians, including Olympic bronze medalist Belle White and springboard diver Millie Hudson, who attempted to swim across the English Channel in 1927, and across the Strait of Gibraltar in 1928. Swimming captain Phyllis M. Gant also qualified for the British squad at the 1924 Paris Olympics, and served as club president in 1927 as Mrs. C. M. Dunston, after marrying a swimmer from Penguin SC. Swimmers Dora Gibbs and Mabel Hamblen from Hammersmith Ladies joined platform diver Belle White in the British squad at the 1928 Olympics. Springboard diver Esme Harris of Hammersmith Ladies SC gained international attention when she competed at the 1948 Summer Olympics at the age of 15. Based in Oxford, she commuted to London on Saturdays to train with Millie Hudson.

Hammersmith Ladies SC were known for their "Diving Belles", as well as their annual long-distance race in the River Thames, hosted in conjunction with the Amateur Swimming Association (ASA). For several years, it was a five-mile, 60-yard route from Kew to Putney, in which many of the women beat the men's times. The club also hosted an annual "swimming entertainment event" at Lime Grove Baths, supported by members of Penguin SC. Swim races were generally suspended during World War II, although the Hammersmith Ladies were involved in at least one inter-club competition in December 1942.

=== Penguin Swimming Club ===
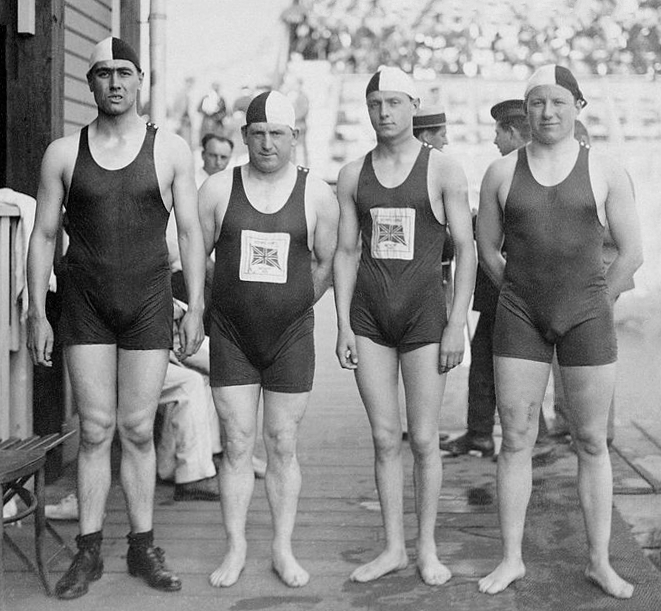
Penguin SC swimmers Percy Peter (2nd from right) and Leslie Savage (right)

The Penguin Swimming Club was co-founded by Rob Derbyshire in 1921. Derbyshire successfully coached several swimmers and water polo players at the 1920, 1924, 1928, 1932, and 1936 Olympics; in 2005, his International Swimming Hall of Fame biography stated that he "probably placed more swimmers on GBR Olympic teams than any other coach." Olympic swimmers he coached included Percy Peter and Leslie Savage, who won bronze medals for Great Britain in the men's 4 x 200-metre relay in 1920, and competed in subsequent Games after joining Penguin. Other Penguin SC swimmers representing Britain during this period included Albert Dickin, Alfred Pycock, and Mickey Ffrench-Williams, who took over from Derbyshire as Penguin head coach in 1939. Olympic divers from Penguin SC included Albert Dickin, Eric MacDonald, Stanley Mercer, Gregory Matveieff, and Wilfred Burne. Penguin SC members on the British Olympic water polo team included Jack Budd and Percy Peter.

After winning the Club Water Polo Championship of England title for the fourth time in 1947, Penguin SC played against the USA Olympic Water Polo team in 1948 at the open air baths on Bloemfontein Road in White City. The fact that Team USA beat "the champions of England, the Penguin Club" by 12 to 3 was interpreted as a "promising" showing for the Americans.

In 1951, the Penguin swimming team won the ASA National Championship title in the men's medley relay, which it successfully defended in 1952. Penguin SC was featured on the cover of The Swimming Times magazine in June 1952.

By 1966, Penguin SC had won the national water polo championship seven times, having won the title previously in 1926, 1927, 1932, 1947, 1951, and 1952. A major figure in Penguin's water polo successes in the post-World War II era was forward and team captain Ron Turner, who has been called "The legend of 'Penguin', London". Both Turner and Penguin teammate, centre-forward Terry Miller, competed on the British men's water polo team at the 1952 Helsinki Olympics and the 1956 Melbourne Olympics; Turner was also a reserve for the GBR squad at the 1948 Olympics. At the 1952 Olympic Games, Turner was selected for the "Rest of World" Team that played against Olympic champions Hungary after the final. By 1966, he had recorded a total of 70 caps for England.

Since the club's early years under Rob Derbyshire, Penguin SC worked closely with the Hammersmith Schools' Swimming Association to teach children how to swim, and developed many talented swimmers and water polo players as a result. In the 1950s through the 1970s, both Penguin SC and the Hammersmith Ladies worked with the Hammersmith Borough Council to support its children's swimming programme called "Water Gypsies".

By 1969, Penguin SC had five senior water polo teams and one junior team. In 1974, the first team in water polo made it to the ASA National League final, but was beaten by Polytechnic. In swimming that year, Penguin won promotion from Division 2 to Division 1 in the Swimming League. Although the results that year were promising, at the end of the season, many of its top players and swimmers retired at once, and the following year, the club struggled to recover from the loss of senior talent. In 1975, the Penguin SC water polo team suffered its first relegation ever from Division 1 in the National League. Similarly, in swimming, the Fulham Chronicle commented after a first-round gala in January 1975: "The teams did well enough not to be disgraced. But I wonder what happened to the once famous Penguin Club that at one time had an excellent water polo team, and produced swimmers like Martin-Dye, John Gorton, and the present Middlesex County champion backstroker Keith Watson. After all, this is the team that won promotion with Fulham last year; but where is the team?"

=== Hammersmith Penguin Swimming Club ===
As of 1 January 1976, Penguin SC merged with the Hammersmith Ladies' Swimming Club, and formed the Hammersmith Penguin Swimming Club. In 1979, the water polo team was promoted back to Division 1, with help from a few older, experienced players including John Martin-Dye, but was relegated again the following year. Then, in 1981, the Hammersmith Penguins took the Division 2 title, dropping just 3 points in 18 games; winning three invitational tournaments; and supplying sixty percent of the Middlesex County team that won the southern counties championship. The water polo team's return to Division 1 in 1982 was hailed as a promising comeback by the Shepherds Bush Gazette, which noted that the Hammersmith Penguins had had to overcome the loss of the Lime Grove Baths as its main pool due to closure, as well as declining membership. The first team at this time was led by captain Steve Baker, a goalkeeper and experienced international who had played water polo for Great Britain, and was coached by John Lake, who helped to rebuild the team by recruiting and developing younger players.

In April 1982, the Hammersmith Penguins hosted a European club tournament attended by sides from Scotland, Wales, Holland, Germany, and Belgium, to raise money for charity. By 1984, the Penguins had a record eight water polo players selected for international trials and competitions, including Ian Spooner and Miguel Ortiz, who were both named to the Under 20 squad for Great Britain.

In 1986, Hammersmith Penguin SC won the first National Deep Water League championship and represented Britain in the Europa League and European Club Championship in Naples, Italy. That year, Hammersmith Penguin SC also entered the Guinness Book of Records for the "longest water polo match", winning a 25-hour charity game against Eton. The following year, Penguin failed to defend its British championship title against Polytechnic, despite the fact that 11 out of 13 members of its side were international water polo players. By 1987, Penguin had had 60 international athletes since it was founded in 1921.

In the late 1980s, Hammersmith Penguin formed a women's water polo team, coached by John Lake. The Penguin women won the National League Division 2 championship title for 1995 and 2000.

In 1996, the Old Lions Masters Water Polo Club of Great Britain, associated with Hammersmith Penguin SC, won a fourth place medal in the World Masters Championships held in Indianapolis, Indiana, in the United States. Four players from Penguin, including Steve Baker, John Barnes, Ian Grimwood, and Paul Whatley, were honoured by the Mayor of Hammersmith for their achievement in becoming "the first British water polo team to win a medal on the world stage since before the Second World War."

On 10 February 2002, the Hammersmith Penguin SC won the British Water Polo Championship held in Sheffield. The winning team consisted of players not only from England, but also Scotland, Wales, Iran, Turkey, and Azerbaijan. Hammersmith Penguin represented Britain in the LEN Water Polo Champions Cup, but was eliminated during the group qualification stage in October 2002.

=== West London Penguin Swimming and Water Polo Club ===
In 2006, Hammersmith Penguin SC changed its name to West London Penguin Swimming and Water Polo Club "to reflect...broader representation in London." According to past president Steve Baker, the problem with the "Hammersmith" name was that it lacked recognition overseas, and over the years, they have become known informally as the "London Penguins". Nevertheless, the club's application to change its name to "London Penguin" was rejected by the ASA on the grounds that London was too large of a geographic area; only clubs such as Polytechnic and Otter which had historically used London in their names were allowed to keep them.

In 2008, the West London Penguin women's water polo team placed second in their British Water Polo Championships, while the men's team placed fourth. In February 2010, the West London Penguin women were the "surprise finalists" in the British Gas Water Polo Championships in the Manchester Aquatics Centre, narrowly losing to holders City of Manchester 8–7. The women's side included Frankie Snell, who later competed as part of the Team GB squad at the London 2012 Olympics.

== Pool use ==
From the mid-1950s, members of Penguin SC were complaining publicly about the inadequate pool size at Lime Grove Baths. During an emergency closure of the Lime Grove site, Penguin SC members, which then included members of the British Olympic Water Polo team, had to train at other pools in Acton, Uxbridge, Paddington, Kensington, and Chelsea. For a period, the club was forced to focus on water polo at the expense of swimming, but started to revive its swimming programme when it once again secured pool time at Lime Grove Baths in December 1960.

In 1980, Hammersmith Penguin announced that it was in danger of closing, following the permanent closure of Lime Grove Baths. With the closure of the pools at Lime Grove, the new White City Pool was the only one available in the borough, and was starting to charge clubs up to £100 an hour for exclusive use. Following negotiations in 1982, Hammersmith Council agreed to reduce proposed charges of £25 an hour for club pool use to £9.45 an hour. Ongoing maintenance and upgrades of the pool in White City meant that the pool was closed for months at a time, requiring Hammersmith Penguin SC to move training temporarily to Fulham Pools. Over the years, Penguin moved from pool to pool across West London, training at pools including Kensington New Pools, Imperial College, Gurnell Leisure Centre, Shell Centre, and many others.

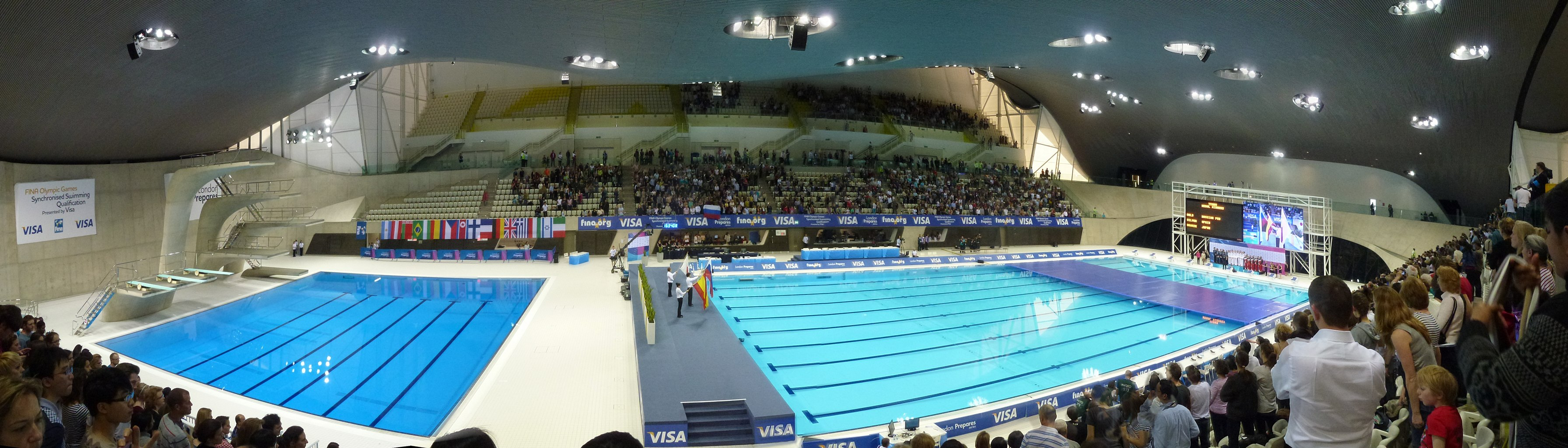
London Aquatics Centre pools in East London

The opening of a new Olympic-sized 50-metre pool indoors at Hillingdon Sports and Leisure Complex in 2010 was a significant boost for West London Penguin. Under club president Steve Baker, West London Penguin secured the water polo contract for the pool, and started its junior water polo programme there in 2010. As of 2022, pools used by West London Penguin S&WPC include the London Aquatics Centre, Latymer Upper School, Hillingdon Sports & Leisure Centre, St. Paul's School, and Fulham Pools.

== Notable Olympic athletes ==
All Penguin SC, Hammersmith Ladies SC, Hammersmith Penguin SC, and West London Swimming and Water Polo Club members listed below are international players who represented Great Britain in the Summer Olympic Games, unless noted otherwise.

=== Water polo ===
- Jack Budd – 1924, 1928 Olympics
- Percy Peter – 1928 Olympics (also Swimming)
- Ron Turner – 1952, 1956 Olympics
- Terry Miller – 1952, 1956 Olympics
- Stan Hawkins – 1952 Olympics
- Igor Zagoruiko – 2000, 2004 Olympics (for Kazakhstan)
- Francesca Snell – 2012 Olympics

=== Swimming ===
- Rob Derbyshire – 1900, 1906, 1908, 1912 Olympics
- Albert Dickin – 1920, 1924, 1928 Olympics (also Diving)
- Percy Peter – 1920, 1924, 1928 Olympics (also Water Polo)
- Phyllis Gant – 1924 Olympics
- Alfred Pycock – 1924 Olympics
- Les Savage – 1920, 1924 Olympics
- Dora Gibbs – 1928 Olympics
- Mickey Ffrench-Williams – 1932, 1936 Olympics
- John Martin-Dye – 1960, 1964 Olympics

=== Diving ===
- Belle White – 1912, 1920, 1924, 1928 Olympics
- Albert Dickin – 1920, 1924 Olympics (also Swimming)
- Millie Hudson – 1924 Olympics
- Eric MacDonald – 1924 Olympics
- Gregor Matveleff – 1924 Olympics
- Stanley Mercer – 1924 Olympics
- Wilfred Burne – 1928 Olympics
- Esme Harris – 1948 Olympics
