= Lime =

Lime most commonly refers to:

- Lime (fruit), a green citrus fruit
- Lime (material), inorganic materials containing calcium, usually calcium oxide or calcium hydroxide
- Lime (color), between yellow and green

Lime may also refer to:

== Botany ==
- Australian lime, a species of Citrus native to Australia and Papua New Guinea
- Key lime, a citrus hybrid with a spherical fruit
- Persian lime, a citrus fruit species of hybrid origin
- Tilia, a genus of trees known in Britain as lime trees, lime-wood, basswood, or linden
- Wild lime or Zanthoxylum fagara, a green fruit native to the Americas

== Chemistry ==
- Agricultural lime, a soil additive containing calcium carbonate and other ingredients
- Birdlime, a sticky substance spread on branches to trap small birds
- Calcium hydroxide, a.k.a. slaked lime, slack lime, limewater, pickling lime or hydrated lime
  - Hydraulic lime, used to make lime mortar
- Calcium oxide, a.k.a. burnt lime or quicklime

== Surname ==
- Harold Lime (1928–2008), American pornographic film director
- Rickey Lime (born 1980), American musician
- Yvonne Lime (1935–2026), American actress and philanthropist

== Places ==
- Lime, Oregon, US
- Limé, a French commune in the Aisne department
- Lime Lake Township, Murray County, Minnesota, US
- Lime Township, Blue Earth County, Minnesota, US
- Lime Village, Alaska, US
- Milan Bergamo Airport, ICAO code LIME

== Arts, entertainment, and media ==
=== Music ===
- Lime (band), a Canadian synthpop duo
- Lime (singer) (Kim Hye-lim, born 1993), a member of the girl group Hello Venus
- Lime (album), by Arvingarna, 1999

=== Television ===
- Lime Pictures, a TV production company
- Lime TV, a website and former television network

=== Other uses in arts, entertainment, and media ===
- Lime (magazine), an Asian lifestyle magazine
- Lime (video game company), a sister brand of the Japanese adult video game company Navel
- Lime, a main heroine in 1993 Jewel BEM Hunter Lime
- Lime, a 1996 Saber Marionette J character
- Harry Lime, a character in 1949 film The Third Man

== Brands and enterprises ==
- LIME (telecommunications company), a Caribbean telecommunications company
- Lime (transportation company), a company which operates dockless bicycle and scooter sharing systems

== Technology ==
- Lime (test framework), a PHP testing framework
- "Landline, Internet, Mobile, Entertainment", used in the Internet industry

== Other uses ==
- LIME Sports Club, a cricket club in Barbados

== See also ==
- Limes (disambiguation)
- Lime Creek (disambiguation)
- Lime Grove (disambiguation)
- Lime Kiln (disambiguation)
- Lime Lake (disambiguation)
- Lime Ridge (disambiguation)
- Lime Street (disambiguation)
- Limey (disambiguation)
- Lyme (disambiguation)
