= Lime Lake =

Lime Lake or Lake Lime may refer to:

== Inhabited places ==
- Lime Lake, New York, United States
- Lime Lake Township, Murray County, Minnesota, United States
- Lime Lake, in the municipality of Tweed, Ontario, Canada

== Lakes in Canada ==
- Lime Lake (Hastings County), Ontario
- Lime Lake (Thunder Bay District), Ontario
- Lime Lake (Leeds and Grenville United Counties), Ontario

== Lakes in the United States ==
- Lime Lake (Sarasota, Florida)
- Lime Lake (Michigan)
- Lime Lake (Murray County, Minnesota)
- Lime Lake (New York)
- Lime Lake (Pend Oreille County, Washington)
- Lake Lime (Wisconsin)
