= Millie Hudson =

British diver, swimmer, sports journalist

Personal information
- Full name: Amelia Bremer Hudson
- National team: Great Britain
- Born: 11 July 1902 Sunderland, Tyne and Wear, England
- Died: 17 September 1966 (aged 64) Stepney, Greater London, England
- Occupations: Sports journalist Diving coach Typist

Sport
- Sport: Springboard diving
- Club: Hammersmith Ladies SC

Millie Hudson (11 July 1902 – 17 September 1966) was a British diver, open water swimmer, diving coach, and sports journalist. She competed in the women's 3 metre springboard event at the 1924 Summer Olympics. In 1927, she attempted to swim across the English Channel, but had to abandon her attempt after 13 hours in the water. In 1928, she attempted to cross the Strait of Gibraltar, but failed after 8.5 hours due to rough waters. After retiring from long-distance swimming, she continued to coach, and trained British Olympic springboard diver Esme Harris. Hudson was the swimming correspondent for the Evening Standard in London, and became the first woman to be admitted to the Sports Writers' Association in 1949.

== Early life and training ==
She was born Amelia Hudson in Sunderland, England. When she was an infant, her family moved to South Africa. After the death of her father, a flour miller, Millie and her mother returned to England in 1920. Millie Hudson then joined the Hammersmith Ladies Swimming Club. When she was 24, Millie was living in Hammersmith and working as a typist in Kensington, London.

== Diving and swimming career ==
=== Olympics ===
Millie Hudson competed in the 1924 Paris Olympics, after winning the Olympic trial in Blackpool. Although she did not advance to the final, she finished ahead of the two other British entrants, Catherine O'Bryen and Gladys Luscombe.

=== English Channel attempt ===
After the Olympics, Hudson switched to open water swimming, due to injuries she had sustained while diving. In 1927, she trained to swim across the English Channel. One of her coaches was four-time Olympian and gold medalist Rob Derbyshire, secretary of the Penguin Swimming Club, which was affiliated with Hammersmith Ladies SC. In a July 1927 interview, Hudson said that her employer had agreed to give her time off from work to train, but was unsure about how she would raise money for her swim. She explained that part of her motivation was that she was "tired of seeing Americans come over here to break records, and I'm sure it's time we English woke up." On the morning of 16 September 1927, she started her channel crossing attempt, leaving Cap Grisnez, France. Thirteen hours later, she had to abandon the attempt, due to choppy waters, although she was in sight of the English shore.

=== Strait of Gibraltar attempt ===
Following her failed attempt to swim across the English Channel, Hudson made international headlines when she set her sights on swimming across the Strait of Gibraltar between Europe and Africa. On 2 January 1928, she abandoned her attempt after 8.5 hours, when she was 4.5 miles from the Spanish shore, due to rough waters. The same day, fellow British swimmer Mercedes Gleitze was also forced to abandon her attempt.

=== Wrigley Marathon in Toronto ===
In August 1928, Millie Hudson went to Toronto to compete in "The Third Wrigley Marathon for the Championship of the World", an open-ocean swim race held as part of the Canadian National Exhibition. Ahead of the event, she trained in New York, and was coached by Eric Barenshee, who had trained the winner of the first 1927 marathon, Ernst Vierkoetter. Although expectations were high, on 29 August 1928, only one of the European women completed the race; Hudson had to be helped out of the water close to the finish line.

== Post-aquatics career ==
Following the Toronto swimming marathon, Hudson stayed in Canada for six years, working as a swimming and diving coach, and as a freelance journalist. In 1933, she started writing a series of articles on "How to Swim and Dive", which were published in the Edmonton Journal.

During World War II, Hudson wrote to her contacts in Canada from London, and her updates were covered periodically by Myrtle Cook in her "In the Women's Sportlight" column in The Montreal Star. During the London blitz, Hudson was forced to leave her home twice due to bombing, and she survived rocket blasts in 1944. In January 1942, Hudson wrote to Cook about meeting the Queen, who remembered her 1926 diving exhibition at the Royal Automobile Club. Later that year, Hudson said that she and other women were learning to shoot, handle guns, and do jujitsu. They were taught by Canadian military officers, as part of the British Women's Home Defence movement, started by Dr Edith Summerskill, MP. Hudson volunteered for the Red Cross in her spare time, and reported that she had managed to swim at Weymouth after American army bulldozers cleared the beaches in 1944.

Hudson became a swimming correspondent for the Evening Standard. Leading up to the 1948 Summer Olympics, she was a diving coach to British springboard diver Esme Harris, who competed in the London Olympics at the age of 15. Every Saturday for year, Harris had traveled from Oxford to London to train with Millie Hudson. Four years later, Hudson was the only female sports writer from Britain to cover the 1952 Helsinki Olympics.

In 1949, Hudson became the first female member of the Sports Writers' Association, but she was denied entry into the association's annual dinner events. She remained the Sports Writers' Association's only female member until 1955.

In 1956, Hudson was in the boat when 22-year-old Elizabeth Wild from New Zealand failed to swim across the English channel. She told reporters that it was "terribly cold" and that Wild had to be taken out of the water against her will.

== Personal life and death ==
Millie Hudson never married. She died on 17 September 1966 after a short illness, only ten days after traveling to Blackpool to report on the Amateur Swimming Championships. Her funeral at Golders Green Crematorium was attended by representatives of the Evening Standard, as well as the Daily Express, Sunday Express, and The Daily Mail.
