= Diving at the 1924 Summer Olympics – Women's 3 metre springboard =

Women's 3 metre springboard at the Games of the VIII Olympiad
- Venue: Swimming Stadium Tourelles
- Dates: 17 July (semifinals); 18 July (final)
- Competitors: 17 from 7 nations

Medalists
1st place, gold medalist(s)		Elizabeth Becker	United States
2nd place, silver medalist(s)		Aileen Riggin	United States
3rd place, bronze medalist(s)		Caroline Fletcher	United States

The women's 3 metre springboard, also reported as plongeons du tremplin (English: trampoline diving), was one of five diving events on the diving at the 1924 Summer Olympics programme. The competition was actually held from both 3 metre and 1 metre boards. The competitors performed six dives of their choice. The competition was held on Thursday 17 July 1924, and Friday 18 July 1924. Seventeen divers from seven nations competed.

== Results ==
=== First round ===
The three divers who scored the smallest number of points in each group of the first round advanced to the final.

==== Group 1 ====
Place	Diver	Nation	Points	Score	Notes
1	Elizabeth Becker-Pinkston	United States	6	482.4	Q
2	Aileen Riggin	United States	13	439.3	Q
3	Klara Bornett	Austria	13	417.4	Q
4	Märta Johansson	Sweden	19	377.8	
5	Louise Lenormand	France	26	313.0	
6	Truus Klapwijk	Netherlands	28	287.3	
7	Cecily O'Bryen	Great Britain	35	258.8	
8	Eugenie Briollet	France	40	235.2	

==== Group 2 ====
Place	Diver	Nation	Points	Score	Notes
1	Caroline Fletcher	United States	7	446.6	Q
2	Signe Johansson	Sweden	10	421.7	Q
3	Eva Olliwier	Sweden	14	408.8	Q
4	Viktoria Sölkner	Austria	21	362.9	
5	Millie Hudson	Great Britain	23	345.2	
6	Suzanne Raeth	France	32.5	274.0	
7	Hendrika Bante	Netherlands	35	270.6	
8	Gladys Luscombe	Great Britain	40.5	244.0	
9	Aloisie Krongeigerová	Czechoslovakia	42	233.2	

=== Final ===
Place	Diver	Nation	Points	Score
1st place, gold medalist(s)	Elizabeth Becker-Pinkston	United States	8	474.5
2nd place, silver medalist(s)	Aileen Riggin	United States	12	460.4
3rd place, bronze medalist(s)	Caroline Fletcher	United States	16	436.4
4	Eva Olliwier	Sweden	20	425.8
5	Signe Johansson	Sweden	21	412.6
6	Klara Bornett	Austria	28	370.2

== Sources ==
- Comité Olympique Français (1924). "Les Jeux de la VIIIe Olympiade - Rapport Officiel" (PDF). pp. p. 480. Archived from the original (pdf) on 10 April 2008.
- Herman de Wael (3 August 2003). "Diving 1924". Archived from the original on 11 June 2007.
