= List of RCA Records artists =

This is an incomplete list of recording artists signed with RCA Records, including those whose material bears the RCA Victor brand. All acts are listed alphabetically by their first name or (ignoring the words "A", "An", and "The") group name. The * symbol indicates artists no longer signed to the label. A larger collection of artists formerly signed to RCA Records may be found at Category:RCA Records artists.

== 0-9 ==
- 2AM Club
- 2Heartless Ray (Canada)
- 3 of Hearts (RCA Nashville)
- 9.9
- 1000 Mona Lisas

== A ==
- A-ha
- Academy
- Aaron Lines
- Aaron Tippin (RCA Nashville)
- ABBA (Oceania/Latin America)
- ABRA (Polo Grounds/RCA)
- Abbe Lane
- Ace of Base (Arista)
- Adam Lambert
- A Flock of Seagulls (Jive/RCA)
- Aiden Grimshaw
- Akiko Wada (RCA Japan)
- Alabama (RCA Nashville)
- Alain Barrière (Canada and France)
- Alan Walker
- Alanis Morissette (Crush/RCA) (outside North America)
- Alexandra Burke (RCA/Syco Music UK)
- Alex G
- Alex Harvey (post-SAHB)
- Al Hirt
- Alicia de Larrocha (RCA Red Seal)
- Alicia Keys
- Audrey Mika
- Alizée
- Allan Clarke
- Almendra
- Al Stewart (outside US/Canada)
- Alys Robi (RCA Canada)
- Amalia Mendoza (RCA Victor Méxicana)
- Amber Run
- A'me Lorain
- Ameer Vann (Winston Wolf/RCA)
- Amici Forever
- Anderson Bruford Wakeman Howe (Arista)
- Andrea Faustini
- Andy Childs (RCA Nashville)
- Andy Griggs (RCA Nashville)
- Andy Kirk
- Aneila Malia (Sony/RCA Malaysia)
- Angie Miller
- Anita Kerr Singers
- Ann-Margret
- Annie Lennox (outside the US only)
- Anthony Hamilton
- Anti-Flag
- Apocalyptica
- April Stevens
- Ari Abdul
- Aretha Franklin
- Argent Counterpoints album – 1975
- Artie Shaw
- Artms (Modhaus/RCA)
- ASAP Ferg
- ASAP Rocky (ASAP Worldwide/Polo Grounds Music/RCA)
- Ashley Benson
- Asleep at the Wheel (RCA Nashville)
- Aston Merrygold Solo (Joint deal with Epic Records)
- Atom Smash
- ATEEZ (KQ Entertainment/RCA)
- Autograph
- Automatic Loveletter
- Avery Wilson
- Avion (RCA Australia)
- Avril Lavigne
- Ayo Jay
- Ayushita Solo (RCA Jogjakarta)
- Aztec Two-Step

== B ==
- B. J. Arnau
- B2Krazy (Iron Music/BMG Canada)
- Baccara
- Backstreet Boys (RCA/Legacy)
- Baillie & the Boys (RCA Nashville)
- Bardot produced by Pip Williams
- Barry Manilow
- Barry McGuire (Canada, leased from Dunhill)
- Barry Sadler
- BBC Scottish Symphony Orchestra
- BC Jean
- Becky G (Kemosabe/RCA)
- Becky Hobbs (RCA Nashville)
- Ben Haenow (USA Only)
- Ben Kweller
- Benny Goodman
- Benny Moré
- Betty Who
- Billy Graham
- Bix Beiderbecke
- Black Box
- Black Rebel Motorcycle Club
- Bleachers
- Bobby Bare
- Bobby Johnson
- Bobby Pinson (RCA Nashville)
- Bo Diddley
- Boney M.
- Bonnie Tyler
- Boston Symphony Orchestra
- Bow Wow Wow
- Bowling for Soup
- Boyd Tinsley
- Boy Meets Girl
- Brandy (Chameleon Entertainment/RCA)
- Brice Long (RCA Nashville)
- Bring Me the Horizon
- Britney Spears
- Broadway Symphony Orchestra
- Bo Bice (19/S/RCA)
- Brockhampton (Question Everything/RCA)
- Brooke Candy
- Browning Bryant
- Bruce Hornsby
- Bryson Tiller
- Bucks Fizz
- Buddy Guy
- Budgie early 80s output
- BBB (RCA Indonesia)
- Bullet for My Valentine
- Bullets and Octane
- Bunji Garlin
- Buster Poindexter
- Brit Smith (Jive/RCA)

== C ==
- Cady Groves
- Cage the Elephant
- Carter Family
- The Carter Sisters and Mother Maybelle
- Cam
- Carlos Gardel
- Catherine Britt (RCA Nashville)
- Cave In
- Charles Aznavour
- Charley Pride (RCA Nashville)
- Charlie
- Charlie Wilson
- Cher
- Chet Atkins (RCA Nashville)
- Chet Huntley and David Brinkley
- Childish Gambino
- Choi Soo-young (Saram Entertainment/RCA Records, Korean releases only)
- Chris Brown (Chris Brown Entertainment/RCA)
- Chris Malinchak
- Christina Aguilera
- Chris Young (RCA Nashville)
- Chuck Wicks (RCA Nashville)
- Cinta Laura (Sony/RCA/Columbia Malaysia)
- Circus of Power
- Citizen Cope
- Cady Groves
- Clannad
- Clay Aiken
- Clay Walker (RCA Nashville)
- Cleo Laine
- Clint Black (RCA Nashville)
- Hello Demons Meet Skeletons
- Clodagh Rodgers
- Coko
- Coleman Hawkins
- Coley McCabe (RCA Nashville)
- Colin Davis (RCA Red Seal)
- Colony House
- Colter Wall
- Common Market
- Connie Smith (RCA Nashville)
- Cousin Stizz
- Cowboy Junkies
- Crystal Shawanda (RCA Nashville)
- César Costa
- Chris brown G

== D ==
- David Bowie (RCA/RCA Red Seal)
- D'Angelo
- Dan Schafer ('RCA Victor US/Canada' & 'Tortoise International' RCA distributed)
- Daniel Merriweather
- Daniel Skye
- Danny Davis and the Nashville Brass (RCA Nashville)
- Danny Gokey (RCA Nashville)
- Daryl Hall
- Daughtry (19/RCA)
- Dave Matthews Band (Bama Rags/RCA)
- David Cook
- David Gray (ATO/RCA) (North America)
- Davido
- Deborah Allen (RCA Nashville)
- Dee-1
- Deep Purple (outside US)
- Dennis Parker
- Diana DeGarmo
- Diana Ross
- Diana Vickers
- Dido
- Dinah Shore
- Dizzy Gillespie
- Doja Cat (Kemosabe/RCA)
- Dolly Parton (RCA Nashville)
- Don Gibson
- Don McLean
- Don Redman
- Dottie West (RCA Nashville)
- Dottsy
- Doug and the Slugs
- Dr. Buzzard's Original Savannah Band
- Dry the River
- DreamDoll* (District 18/RCA)
- Duane Eddy
- Duke Ellington

== E ==
- Earl Thomas Conley (RCA Nashville)
- Eartha Kitt
- Ed Ames
- Eddie Fisher
- Eddie Heywood
- Eddie London (RCA Nashville)
- Eddie Rabbitt (RCA Nashville)
- Eddy Arnold (RCA Nashville)
- Eddy Raven (RCA Nashville)
- Eduardo Araújo
- Eem Triplin
- Elle King
- Elle Varner
- Elvis Presley
- Elyar Fox
- Enchantment
- Eoghan Quigg (X Factor 08')
- Erik Hassle
- Ethel Ennis
- Etta James
- Eurythmics (until 1989 in the US)
- Eve 6
- Evelyn "Champagne" King
- Everything Everything
- Eydie Gorme

== F ==
- Fairground Attraction
- Faith, Hope and Charity
- Fannie Flagg
- Fantasia
- Fats Waller
- Father (Awful/RCA)
- Fergie
- Fey
- Five Star
- Flaco Jiménez (Arista Texas)
- Fletcher Henderson
- Flo Milli
- Flora Cash
- Floyd Cramer
- Foo Fighters (RCA/Roswell, 2000–present)
- Fredo
- Forever More
- Foster & Lloyd (RCA Nashville)
- Four Jacks and a Jill
- Fousheé (Trackmasters/RCA)
- Foxes
- Frankie
- Fritz Reiner, Chicago Symphony Orchestra
- Fumble
- Funeral Party
- Freddie Dredd

== G ==
- G-Eazy
- G.R.L. (Kemosabe)
- Gale Garnett
- Garth Brooks (RCA Nashville/Pearl)
- Gary Lewis & the Playboys (songwriter)
- Gavin DeGraw
- George Hamilton IV
- George Jones (RCA Nashville)
- George Russell
- George Winston
- Georgio
- Girlfriend (RCA/Sony Music Australia)
- Gita Gutawa (RCA Jogjakarta)
- Glenn Jones
- Glenn Miller
- Glenn Yarbrough
- Glowie
- GoldLink
- Grayson Hugh
- Guckenheimer Sour Kraut Band
- Guy Sebastian
- Gyakie
- Gypsy

== H ==
- Hall & Oates
- Half Alive
- Hank Locklin
- Hank Snow
- Harry Belafonte
- Harry Lauder
- Harry Nilsson
- Haysi Fantayzee
- Headstrong
- Heather Headley
- Hector
- Helena Paparizou
- Helloween
- Henry Mancini
- Herbert von Karajan (RCA Red Seal)
- H.E.R.
- Highlight (Around Us/RCA, Korean releases only)
- Hilary Duff
- Hiroshi Uchiyamada and Cool Five (RCA Japan)
- Hoodoo Gurus
- Hot Chelle Rae
- Hot Tuna
- Hotwire
- House of Lords
- Hugo and Luigi
- Hugo Montenegro
- Hugo Winterhalter
- Hum
- Human Drama
- Hunter Hunted
- Hurts

== I ==
- Ian Anderson (RCA Red Seal)
- Iggy Pop
- Imogen Heap
- Imus in the Morning
- Innosense
- Los Iracundos
- Isaac Dunbar
- Isabel LaRosa
- Ivan Lins
- Idntt (Modhaus/RCA)

== J ==
- Jack Green
- Jack Ingram (RCA Nashville)
- Jack Jones
- Jacob Latimore
- Jacob Sartorius
- Jade
- Jahméne Douglas
- Jake Bugg
- Jake Owen (RCA Nashville)
- Jamie Foxx
- Jamie O'Hara (RCA Nashville)
- Jaye P. Morgan
- Jay Chou (BMG/RCA Malaysia; 2000-2003)
- Jazmine Sullivan
- Jeanette MacDonald & Nelson Eddy
- Jeff Bates (RCA Nashville)
- Jefferson Airplane
- Jefferson Starship (Grunt/RCA)
- Jelly Roll Morton
- Jem
- Jennifer Hudson
- Jenny Lou Carson
- Jerry Reed (RCA Nashville)
- Jethro Tull (RCA Red Seal)
- Jim Ed Brown (RCA Nashville)
- Jim Hawthorne
- Jimmy Castor
- Jimmy Eat World
- Jim Reeves (RCA Nashville)
- JLS (Joint deal with Epic Records, 2009–13)
- Jo Dee Messina
- Jo-El Sonnier (RCA Nashville)
- Joan Armatrading (RCA Victor in the US)
- Joanna Smith (RCA Nashville)
- JoBoxers
- Joe Dassin (Canada, 1972–76, leased from CBS Disques S.A.)
- Joey Valence & Brae
- John Denver
- John Gary
- John Serry, Sr.
- Jon and Vangelis
- Jon Randall (RCA Nashville)
- Jordin Sparks
- Jose Feliciano
- Josephine Baker
- Josh Thompson (RCA Nashville)
- Esquivel
- Juice Newton (RCA Nashville)
- Juicy J (Kemosabe Records)
- Julian Casablancas
- Julie Andrews
- Jaya (LMR/RCA)
- Justin Guarini
- Justin Timberlake

== K ==
- K.Flay
- K. T. Oslin (RCA Nashville)
- Kasabian (Columbia) (in the U.S.) (songwriter)
- Katharine McPhee
- Keith Gattis (songwriter)
- Keith Whitley (RCA Nashville)
- Kelly Clarkson
- Kenny Rogers (RCA Nashville)
- Kent (RCA Victor/BMG Sweden)
- Kesha
- Kevin McCall
- Kevon Edmonds
- Khalid
- Kid Ink
- Kid Rock
- King Los
- Kings of Leon
- Kings of the Sun
- Kirstin Maldonado
- K Koke
- Klaus Nomi
- Kodaline
- Kwesta
- Kris Allen
- Krishna Das
- Krista
- Kygo

== L ==
- La Bouche
- Labrinth
- Lolo Zouaï
- Lancey Foux
- Landon Pigg
- Lari White (RCA Nashville)
- Latto
- Lauren Lucas (RCA Nashville)
- LeAnn Rimes
- Lee DeWyze
- Lee Hyunjun (Sony Music Korea/RCA Records)
- Leikeli47
- Lena Horne
- Leon Everette (RCA Nashville)
- Le Click
- Le Roux
- Leopold Stokowski (RCA Red Seal)
- Lighthouse
- Lil' Chris
- Lil Baby (Quality Control Music/RCA)
- Lila Downs
- Lim Ji-min (Play M/RCA/Columbia)
- Lim Young-woong (New Era Project/RCA)
- Lime
- Limey
- Liona Boyd
- Lionel Hampton
- Lisa (Lloud/RCA)
- Lit
- Lita Ford
- Little Peggy March
- Little Mix
- Liverpool Five
- Lizzy McAlpine (Indigo Blue/RCA)
- London Philharmonic Orchestra (RCA Victor)
- London Symphony Orchestra (RCA Red Seal)
- Longwave
- Loris Tjeknavorian* (RCA Red Seal)
- Lorne Greene
- Lorrie Morgan (RCA Nashville)
- Lou Bega
- Louise Mandrell (RCA Nashville)
- Lou Reed
- Love and Rockets
- Love and Theft (RCA Nashville)
- Love Inc. (Vic Recordings/RCA [Canada]; Logic Records [U.S.]; Sony Music UK)
- Lucy Fleming
- Lucky Daye
- Luke Christopher
- Luke Friend
- Luiz Gonzaga
- Lykke Li

== M ==
- M-Doc
- Machine
- Madeline Bell
- Magic!
- Make This Your Own
- Mali Music
- Måneskin
- Marcella Detroit
- Marc Lavoine (RCA France)
- Mario
- Mario Lanza
- Mariah the Scientist
- Mariya Takeuchi
- Mark Germino
- Mark Ronson
- Marsha Ambrosius
- Martika
- Martina McBride (RCA Nashville)
- Martinho da Vila
- Martin Garrix
- Marty Gold
- Matraca Berg (RCA Nashville)
- Matthew Fisher
- Matthew Koma
- MC Hammer
- Meiska (Sony/Epic/RCA Malaysia)
- Menudo
- Me Phi Me
- Mercedes Sosa
- Michael Johnson (RCA Nashville)
- Mick Fleetwood
- Middle of the Road
- Miguel
- Mike Henderson (RCA Nashville)
- Mike Posner
- Mikky Ekko
- Miku Hatsune
- Miles Lee (songwriter exclusively from Broadcast Music Incorporated (BMI))
- Miley Cyrus
- Miltinho
- Miranda Lambert (RCA Nashville)
- Miriam Makeba
- Misha B
- Miúcha
- Mobb Deep (Loud/RCA/Sony Music)
- Modern Talking
- Monica
- Moonbyul (RBW/RCA/Sony Music)
- Morton Gould
- Mr. Mister
- Mr Probz
- Mud after leaving RAK [also recorded for Private Stock]
- MUNA
- Mylo
- My Morning Jacket
- Myron Cohen
- MØ (RCA Victor)
- Matt Terry

== N ==
- Nadia Malia (Sony/RCA Malaysia)
- Nancy Sinatra
- Natalie Imbruglia
- Natasha Bedingfield (UK)
- Nat Stuckey
- Neal Hefti
- Nebu Kiniza
- Neil Sedaka
- Neon Jungle
- New Politics
- New York City
- Nicholas McDonald
- Nick Carter
- Nicole Scherzinger
- Nike Ardilla
- Niki Evans
- Nina Simone
- Nona Hendryx
- Noah Urrea
- Norman Luboff
- Normani
- Nothing but Thieves
- NSYNC (RCA Records/Jive Records)

== O ==
- Odetta
- Odyssey
- Old Dominion (RCA Nashville)
- Olly Murs
- Opafire (featuring Zachary Norman E.)
- Orchestral Manoeuvres in the Dark (RCA Germany, 2017)
- Out of My Hair
- Outlandish

== P ==
- Pake McEntire (RCA Nashville)
- Papa Vegas
- Park Si-eun (HighUp/Sony/Columbia/RCA; Korean released only)
- Paul Anka
- Paul Kantner
- Paul Overstreet (RCA Nashville)
- PB Natalia (Sony/RCA Malaysia)
- Peking Duk
- Pentatonix
- Perez Prado
- Perry Como
- Peter Nero
- Phil Coulter
- Philadelphia Orchestra (RCA Red Seal)
- P!nk
- Pistol Annies (RCA Nashville)
- Pitbull
- Pop Will Eat Itself
- Porter Wagoner (RCA Nashville)
- P Reign
- Priestess (songwriter exclusively from BMI)
- Prince Royce
- Pure Prairie League

== R ==
- Rak-Su
- Rachael Yamagata
- Ray LaMontagne
- Ray Peterson
- Ray Stevens
- Ray Vaughn
- Razzy Bailey (RCA Nashville)
- Rebecca & Fiona
- The Red Clay Strays
- Redbone
- Renaissance (BTM/RCA) (outside US/Canada)
- Renee Geyer (RCA Australia)
- Ressa Herlambang (Sony/Jive/RCA Malaysia)
- Restless Heart (RCA Nashville)
- Riccardo Cocciante
- Richard Leibert
- Rich The Kid (Rich Forever/RCA)
- Rick Astley (PWL/RCA)
- Rick Springfield
- Riize (SM Entertainment/RCA)
- Ringo Starr (outside US/Germany/Italy)
- Rita Pavone
- Robert Ellis Orrall (RCA Nashville)
- Robert Gordon
- Robert Hazard
- R. City
- R. Kelly
- Rodney Dangerfield
- Rod Stewart
- Roger Whittaker
- Ro James
- Romeo Santos
- Ronnie Milsap (RCA Nashville)
- Royal Philharmonic Orchestra
- Arthur Rubinstein
- Ruby Braff/George Barnes Quartet
- Ruel
- Ruth Ruth

== S ==
- Sad Cafe (outside the US and Canada)
- Saint Asonia
- Samantha Jade
- Sam Cooke
- Sam Dew
- Sammy Adams
- Sammy Davis Jr.
- Sammy Kaye
- Sammy Kershaw (RCA Nashville)
- San Cisco
- Sandi Thom
- Sara Evans (RCA Nashville)
- Sarah McLachlan (outside Canada)
- Sasha Allen
- Sasha Sloan (Independent)
- Saucy Santana
- Say Anything
- Scary Kids Scaring Kids
- Scatman John
- Scorpions
- Sergio Franchi
- Sheff G
- Shakira
- Sherbet
- Shenandoah (RCA Nashville)
- Sherrié Austin
- Sia (Monkey Puzzle/RCA)
- Sidney Bechet
- Silver Sphere
- Ska-P
- Skai isyourgod (RCA Greater China)
- Skeeter Davis (RCA Nashville)
- Skrape
- Slade early 80s output
- Sleeper Agent
- Sleep Token
- Slow Children
- SM*SH (RCA Jogjakarta)
- Smallpools
- Snakehips
- Snoop Dogg (Doggystyle)
- Só Pra Contrariar
- Sonny Rollins
- Spike Jones
- SR-71
- Starland Vocal Band
- STAYC (High Up Entertainment/RCA)
- Stellastarr
- Stephanie Mills
- Steppenwolf (Canada, leased from Dunhill)
- Sterling Simms
- Steve Lacy
- Steve Lawrence and Eydie Gormé
- Steve Vaus (RCA Nashville)
- Stu Phillips
- Sugababes
- SugaRush Beat Company
- Superfruit
- SWV
- The Strokes
- The Sweet
- Sylvia* (RCA Nashville)
- Sylvia McNeill
- Sylvie Vartan
- SZA
- Sérgio Mendes & Brasil 77

== T ==
- T-Pain
- Taco Ockerse
- Take That
- Talia Mar
- Tamar Braxton
- Tane Cain
- Tasha Page-Lockhart
- Tate McRae
- Taylor Girlz
- Taylor Swift (Stayed only 1 year under development deal)
- Tease
- Teezo Touchdown (Not Fit For Society/RCA/SME)
- Tems
- Tenille Townes (Columbia Nashville/RCA)
- Test Your Reflex
- The Alan Parsons Project (Arista)
- The Ames Brothers
- The Angels
- The Archies (Calendar/Kirshner/RCA)
- The Astronauts
- The Bongos
- The Browns
- The Calling
- The Chieftains
- The Cooper Temple Clause
- The Equals
- The Fixx
- The Friends of Distinction
- The Grass Roots (Canada, leased from Dunhill)
- The Guess Who
- The Hoosiers
- The Hues Corporation
- The Judds (Curb/RCA Nashville)
- The Kids from "Fame"
- The Kills
- The Kimberlys
- The Kinks
- The Lamont Cranston Band
- The Limeliters
- The Main Ingredient
- The Mamas & the Papas
- The Mend
- The Monkees (Colgems/RCA)
- The Mood
- The Oak Ridge Boys (RCA Nashville)
- The Osborn Sisters (RCA Nashville)
- The Pointer Sisters
- The Reason 4
- The Ritchie Family
- The Rokes
- The Smithereens
- The Stone Roses
- The Strokes moved to Cult Records
- Sweet then moved to Polydor
- The Thompson Brothers Band (RCA Nashville)
- The Tokens (songwriter exclusively from Broadcast Music Incorporated (BMI))
- The Tourists (outside US/Canada)
- The Tymes
- The Verve Pipe
- The Walls Group
- The Wedding Present
- The Wind and The Wave
- The Womenfolk
- The Wrights (Alan's Country Records/RCA)
- The Youngbloods
- Thin Lizard Dawn
- Three Days Grace
- Three Dimensions
- Tinashe
- Tito Puente
- Tommy Dorsey
- Tommy Shane Steiner (RCA Nashville)
- Tom Odell
- Tone Stith
- Tool - moved to Zoo Entertainment in 1993 and then Volcano Records in 2000 and finally gained their own record label (called Tool Dissectional) in 2006 after a lawsuit with Volcano Records (resolved in 1998 but did not gain independence until 2006)
- Tove Styrke
- Tracy Byrd (RCA Nashville)
- Travis Porter
- Triceratops
- Trisha Yearwood (RCA Nashville)
- TripleS (Modhaus/RCA)
- Trevor Daniel (Alamo Records/RCA)
- Tunde Baiyewu
- Ty England (RCA Nashville)
- Tyler Collins
- Tú

== U ==
- Union J
- Usher

== V ==
- Vanessa White (RCA UK)
- Vangelis
- Van Morrison
- Vanusa
- Vaughn Monroe
- Velvet Revolver
- Victoria Monét
- Vicki Sue Robinson
- The Village People
- Vince Gill (RCA Nashville)
- Véronique Béliveau (Canada)

== W ==
- Walk the Moon
- Wally Cox
- Nardo Wick
- Günter Wand
- Wanessa (RCA Brazil/Sony Music)
- War
- Waylon Jennings (RCA Nashville)
- Weathers
- "Weird Al" Yankovic
- Alexis Weissenberg
- Westlife
- Westworld
- Whitney Houston
- Wild Orchid
- William Singe
- Wizkid
- Willie Nelson (RCA Nashville)
- Wolf Alice
- Wu-Tang Clan (Loud/RCA/BMG Records)

== Y ==
- Xikers (KQ Entertainment/RCA)
- Yes (RCA Victor)
- Yo Gotti
- YoungBloodZ (Ghet-O-Vision/LaFace/Arista)
- You+Me
- Yung Joc
- Young Nudy (SamePlate/Paradise East/Young Nudy, LLC/RCA)

== Z ==
- Zager and Evans
- ZAYN
- ZZ Top
- Zara Larsson
