= Common lime =

Common lime may refer to:

- Common lime tree (Tilia × europaea), a tree also known as the common linden
- Common lime butterfly (Papilio demoleus), a swallowtail butterfly
- Common lime (fruit)
  - Key lime, a common hybrid lime
- Common lime stone
- Common lime water

== See also ==
- (Common) lime (disambiguation)
