= Limey (disambiguation) =

Limey is a slang nickname for a British person. It may also refer to:

- The Limey, a 1999 American crime film
- Limey (band), an English pop/rock band
- Limey (mixtape), the debut mixtape by Rainy Milo
- Limey-Remenauville, a commune in Meurthe-et-Moselle, France
- Limey Way, a challenge walk through Derbyshire, England

== See also ==
- Limay (disambiguation)
- Limeyrat
