= Erica Banks =

American rapper (born 1998)

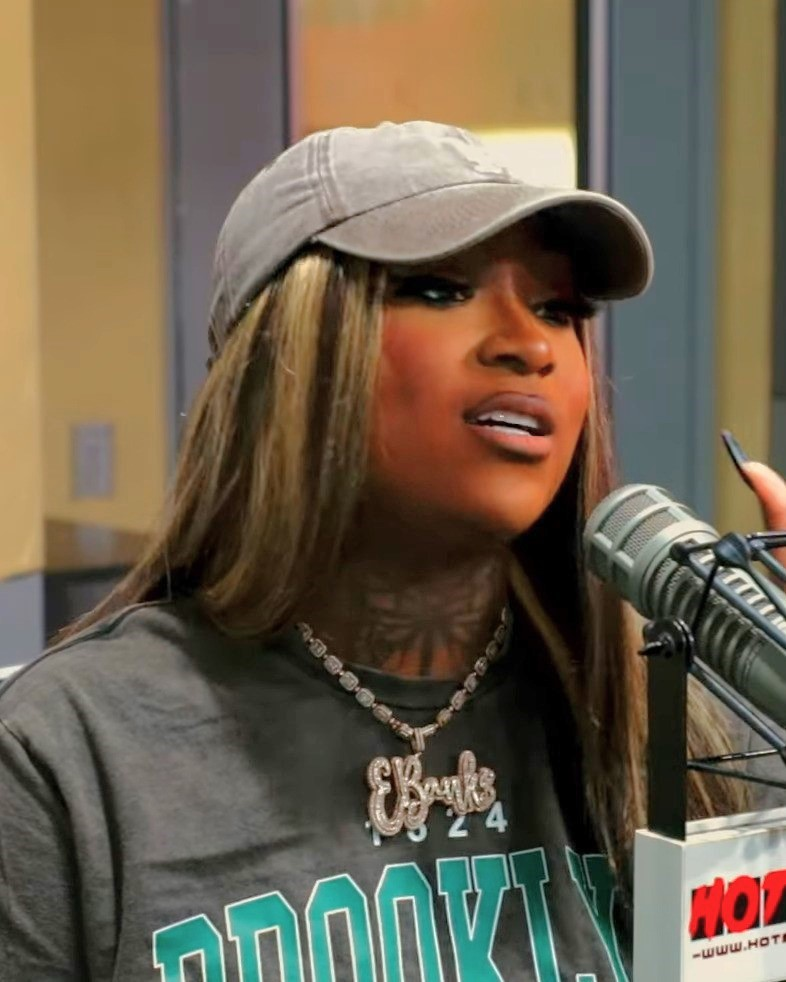
- Banks in 2024

Background information
- Born: October 5, 1998 (age 27); DeSoto, Texas, United States
- Genres: Hip hop
- Occupation: Rapper
- Years active: 2018–present
- Labels: 1501 Certified; Warner; Arista
- Website: www.ericabanksmusic.com

Erica Scharmane Breaux, known professionally as Erica Banks, (born October 5, 1998) is an American rapper born and raised in DeSoto, Texas. Following the release of her first three mixtapes, she signed to 1501 Certified Entertainment, who released her self-titled mixtape in June 2020. It spawned her first charting single, "Buss It", which went viral on TikTok. In January 2021, she signed to Warner Records, on which "Buss It" was reissued.

== Early life ==
Banks was born and raised in DeSoto, Texas. At the age of 12, she began writing poetry, winning several school contests, and started rapping in high school. While attending Texas A&M University–Commerce as a nursing student, she recorded her first songs, leading to her to decide to drop out during her sophomore year to pursue her music career.

== Career ==
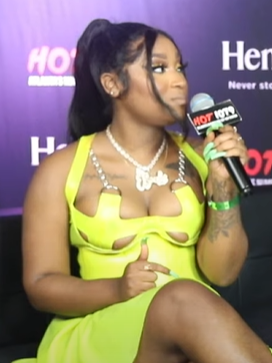
Banks in 2021

In 2018, Banks released her first single, titled "Talk My Shit" independently through SoundCloud. On March 17, 2019, Banks subsequently self-released her first official mixtape, titled Art of the Hustle. In April 2019, she signed with 1501 Certified Entertainment after playing a snippet of her song "Buss It" for the label's CEO, American former baseball player Carl Crawford, in an Instagram Live video. Despite after signing with 1501 Certified, two of her mixtapes – Pressure and Cocky on Purpose – were subsequently self-released between June and November of that year.

On June 19, 2020, Banks released her self-titled fourth mixtape through 1501 Certified. The mixtape spawned the singles, including a full version of the song "Buss It", and "Give Me That", the former of which became Banks's breakout song in January 2021 after becoming the subject of a viral trend on the video-sharing platform TikTok, giving her her first entry on the Billboard Hot 100 chart. In that same month, she signed a record deal with Warner Records. Later in that same month, she was featured on American rapper Yella Beezy's single "Star".

In June 2023, Banks joined the eleventh season of the reality television series, Love & Hip Hop: Atlanta.

In December 2024, Banks signed new deal in a joint venture with Arista Records.

== Artistry ==
Banks has listed rappers Missy Elliott, and Nicki Minaj among her musical inspirations, and Asian Doll as an influence for music and image. Musically, she has been compared by fans to American rapper Megan Thee Stallion and Ti from the Taylor Girlz.

== Discography ==
=== Studio albums ===
List of studio albums with selected details
Title	Details	Charts	certifications
Diary of the Flow Queen	Released: June 17, 2022; Label: 1501 Certified; Format: Digital download, streaming	—	

=== Mixtapes ===
List of mixtapes with selected details
Title	Details	charts
Art of the Hustle	Released: March 17, 2019; Label: Self-released; Format: Digital download, streaming	—
Pressure	Released: June 19, 2019; Label: Self-released; Format: Digital download, streaming	—
Cocky on Purpose	Released: November 12, 2019; Label: Self-released; Format: Digital download, streaming	—
Erica Banks	Released: June 19, 2020; Label: 1501 Certified; Format: Digital download, streaming	—
Class In Session (with DJ Scream)	Released: September 5, 2022; Label: 1501 Certified; Format: streaming	—

=== Extended plays ===
List of extended plays with selected details
Title	Details	charts
Banks B4 Christmas	Released: December 4, 2020; Label: 1501 Certified; Format: Digital download	—

=== Singles ===
==== As lead artist ====
List of singles as lead artist, showing year released, peak chart positions, and album title
Title	Year	Peak chart positions					Certifications	Album(s)
Title	Year	US	US R&B/HH	US Rap	CAN	NZ Hot	Certifications	Album(s)
"Talk My Shit"	2018	—	—	—	—	—		Non-album singles
"Thousand"	2018	—	—	—	—	—		Non-album singles
"No Hook"	2018	—	—	—	—	—		Art of the Hustle
"Taste E-Mix"	2019	—	—	—	—	—		Non-album single
"No Hook, Pt. 2"	2019	—	—	—	—	—		Art of the Hustle
"Mz. E (Diss)"	2020	—	—	—	—	—		Non-album single
"Buss It"	2020	47	1	1	1	23	RIAA: Platinum; RMNZ: Gold	Erica Banks
"Give Me That"	2020	—	—	—	—	—		Erica Banks
"The Best" (TUA Remix)	2022	—	—	—	—	—		Madden NFL 23

==== As featured artist ====
List of singles as featured artist, showing year released and album title
Title	Year	Album(s)
"Payback" (Demund Rogers featuring Erica Banks)	2020	Black Sitcom
"All Booties Matter" (Ferrari Simmons featuring Erica Banks and Lil Donald)	2020	Non-album single
"Energy" (Casino Life Prez featuring Erica Banks)	2020	All 7s
"Shots" (Shawdy Jizzle featuring Erica Banks)	2020	Already a Legend
"She Badd" (RBA Scoobee and RBA Amaze featuring Erica Banks)	2020	Non-album singles
"Apple Pie" (DJ Diamond Kuts featuring BeatKing, Rominiecki and Erica Banks)	2020	Non-album singles
"Jump" (AsiaNae featuring Erica Banks)	2020	Non-album singles
"Throw It" (Judy Drama featuring Erica Banks)	2020	Non-album singles
"Bossin' Up" (MrH Iz BlakkNewz featuring Erica Banks)	2021	Non-album singles
"Rock Out" (Stunna Bam featuring Erica Banks)	2021	Non-album singles
"Star" (Yella Beezy featuring Erica Banks)	2021	Non-album singles
"BAD LIKE RIRI" (Jesswar featuring Erica Banks)	2021	Non-album singles

== Awards and nominations ==
Award	Year	Category	Nominee	Result	Ref.
American Music Awards	2021	Favorite Trending Song	"Buss It"	Nominated	
American Music Awards	2021	Favorite Female Hip-hop Artist	Herself	Nominated	
