= John Budd =

John Budd may refer to:

- John Budd (politician) (born 1950), Australian politician
- John Budd (water polo) (1899–1952), British water polo player
- John M. Budd (1907–1979), American railroad executive
- Johnny Budd (John Walter Budd, 1899–1963), American football player
