= Lyme =

Lyme or LYME may refer to:

- Lyme disease, an infectious disease carried by ticks caused by bacteria of the genus Borrelia

== Places ==
=== United Kingdom ===
- Lyme, an alternative name of Lyme Handley, a civil parish in Cheshire
  - Lyme Park, an estate in Cheshire
- Lyme Regis, a town in Dorset commonly known as Lyme
  - Lyme Bay, an area of the English Channel
- Lyme Brook, tributary stream of the River Trent, Staffordshire
- Forest of Lyme, a historic area of forest covering parts of Cheshire, Derbyshire, and Staffordshire
- Newcastle-under-Lyme, a town and borough in Staffordshire
- Uplyme

=== United States ===
- Lyme, Connecticut, a town in southeastern Connecticut, the namesake of Lyme disease
  - Old Lyme, Connecticut, a neighboring town
  - East Lyme, Connecticut, a neighboring town
- Lyme, New Hampshire, a town in western New Hampshire
- Lyme, New York, a town in New York along the Lake Ontario shoreline
- Lyme Township, Huron County, Ohio, a small town in northern Ohio
- New Lyme (disambiguation), several towns in the United States

=== Other places ===
- Lyme Park, Gauteng, a suburb of Johannesburg, South Africa

== Ships ==
- English ship Lyme (1654), 52-gun third rate Speaker-class frigate built at Portsmouth, launched in 1654
- HMS Lyme, any of several vessels of the British Royal Navy
- RFA Lyme Bay (L3007), a landing ship dock of the British Royal Fleet Auxiliary

== People ==
- David Lyme (born 1966), also known as Jordi Cubino, a Catalan singer, songwriter, and model

== Other uses ==
- LYME (software bundle), a solution stack consisting of Linux, Yaws, Mnesia, and Erlang
- Lyme Art Association, arts organization established in 1914, with roots going back to 1902
- Lyme-grass or Leymus arenarius

== See also ==
- Lyme and Cybelle, American folk/pop duo, 1960s
- Flyme (disambiguation)
- Glyme (disambiguation)
