= Caroline Fletcher =

American diver

Personal information
- Born: November 22, 1906 Denver, Colorado, United States
- Died: April 3, 1998 (aged 91)

Sport
- Sport: Diving
Medal record
Representing United States
Diving
Bronze medal – third place	1924 Paris	3 m springboard

Caroline Fletcher (later Metten; November 22, 1906 – April 3, 1998) was an American diver who competed in the 1924 Summer Olympics. In 1924 Fletcher won the bronze medal in the 3 metre springboard competition.
