= Klara Bornett =

Austrian diver

Personal information
- Born: 8 January 1895

Sport
- Sport: Diving
Medal record
Women's diving
Representing Austria
European Championships
Gold medal – first place	1927 Bologna	3 m springboard

Klara Bornett (born 8 January 1895, date of death unknown) was an Austrian diver who competed in the 1924 Summer Olympics and the 1928 Summer Olympics.

Klara Bornett was born into a large Jewish family to Heinrich Kohn and Clotilde Stern in Viennal. She was one of Austria's most successful divers during the 1920s, winning several national championship titles in both springboard and high diving. She competed at two Olympic Games, at Paris 1924 and Amsterdam 1928. Little is known about Bornett's early days but she would have been in her twenties when she represented Austria in the 1924 Summer Olympics in Paris, she competed in the 3 metre springboard event, in her first round group she scored 417.4 points and finished third and qualified for the final, in the final there were six divers and unfortunately one judge marked her in fourth place while the other four judges had her marked in sixth which was her overall finish position.

In between her Olympic appearances, Bornett won the gold medal in the 3 metre springboard at the 1927 European Aquatics Championships held in Bologna, Italy.

For the 1928 Summer Olympics in Amsterdam, there was just 10 entries for the 3 metre springboard so instead of groups, a direct final was contested where Bornett finished in 9th place.

Her career came to an end when she became blind in one eye, and some years later she lost her eyesight completely.
