= Limes =

Limes may refer to:

- Limes (Roman Empire), a border marker and defense system of the Roman Empire
- Limes (Italian magazine), an Italian geopolitical magazine
- Limes (Romanian magazine), a Romanian literary and political quarterly magazine

== See also ==
- Lime (disambiguation)
