= Viktoria Sölkner =

Austrian diver

Personal information
- Nationality: Austrian
- Born: 8 December 1905; Graz, Austria-Hungary
- Died: 28 September 1983 (aged 77); Graz, Austria

Sport
- Sport: Diving

Viktoria Sölkner (8 December 1905 – 28 September 1983) was an Austrian diver. She competed in the women's 3 metre springboard event at the 1924 Summer Olympics.
