= Louise Lenormand =

French diver

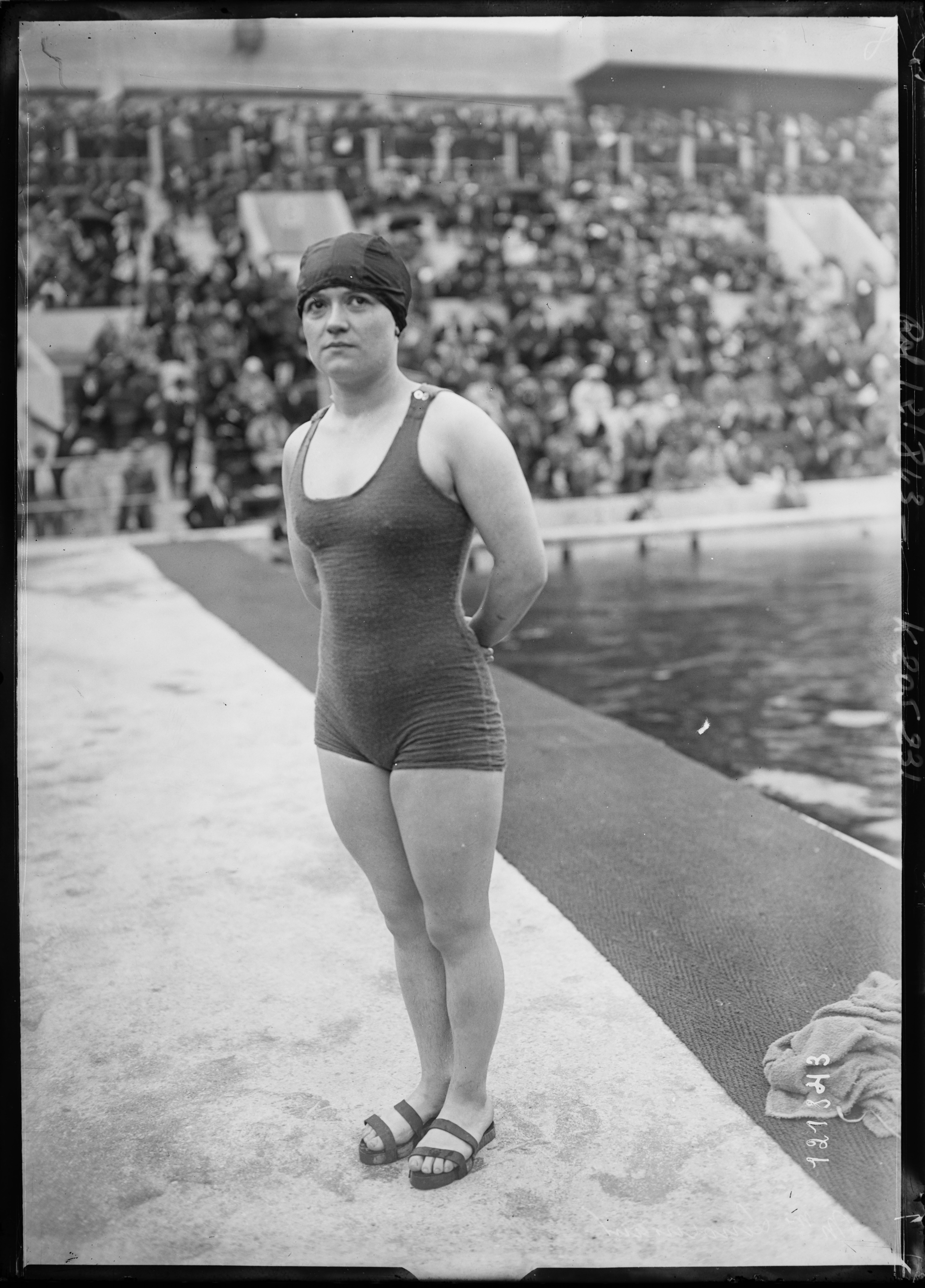
- Louise Lenormand at the Piscine des Tourelles in July 1927.

Personal information
- Nationality: French
- Born: 14 June 1901; Maisons-Alfort
- Died: 3 December 1995 (aged 94); Sevran
- Spouse: Eugène Lenormand

Sport
- Sport: Diving

Louise Lenormand (14 June 1901 – 3 December 1995) was a French diver. She competed in the women's 3 metre springboard event at the 1924 Summer Olympics.
