= Lime Grove Baths =

Swimming pool in the London Borough of Hammersmith & Fulham

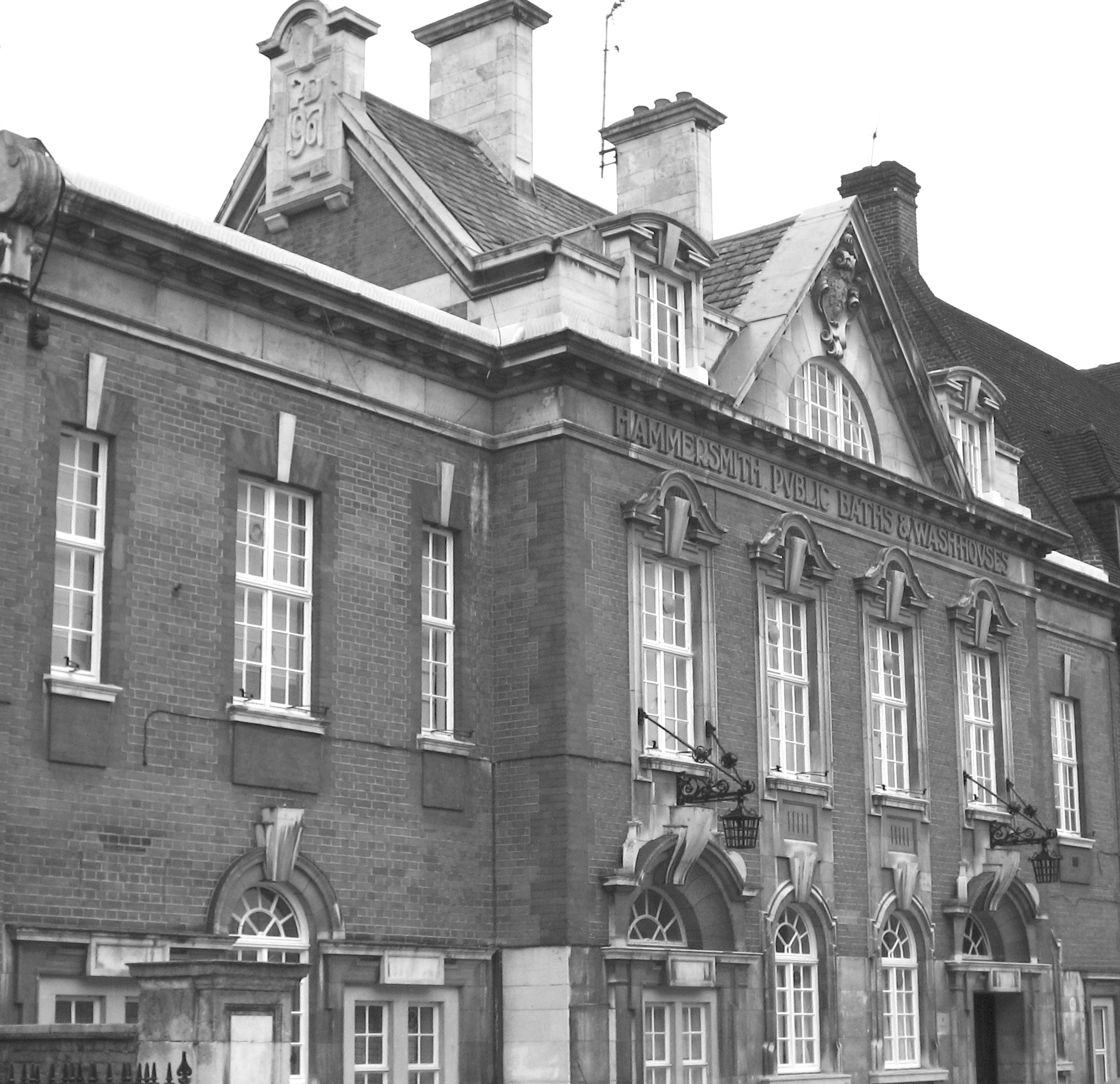
- Lime Grove Baths
- Interactive map of Lime Grove Baths
- Location: 42 Lime Grove, United Kingdom, W12 8EA
- Coordinates: 51.5035°N 0.2285°W
- Operator: Hammersmith and Fulham London Borough Council
- Dimensions: Depth: 8 feet (2.4 m)

Construction
- Opened: 1907
- Closed: 1980

Lime Grove Baths was a public bath and wash house in the London Borough of Hammersmith and Fulham located on Lime Grove, Shepherd's Bush.

The baths first opened in 1907. In the 1980s, the baths closed down. The pool hall and baths were demolished and the entrance block was converted into flats.

== History ==
=== Origins ===
Since at least 8 November 1897, the land belonged to the Latymer Foundation. By a conveyance dated 30 November 1904, the land was acquired by the Metropolitan Borough of Hammersmith from Richard Durnford, Secretary to the Charity Commissioners of England and Wales.

The Lime Grove Baths was formally opened on Thursday 7 November 1907 by Edmund Charles Rawlings, the Mayor of Hammersmith. The opening gala included an aquatic display arranged by the committee starting at 6:30pm.

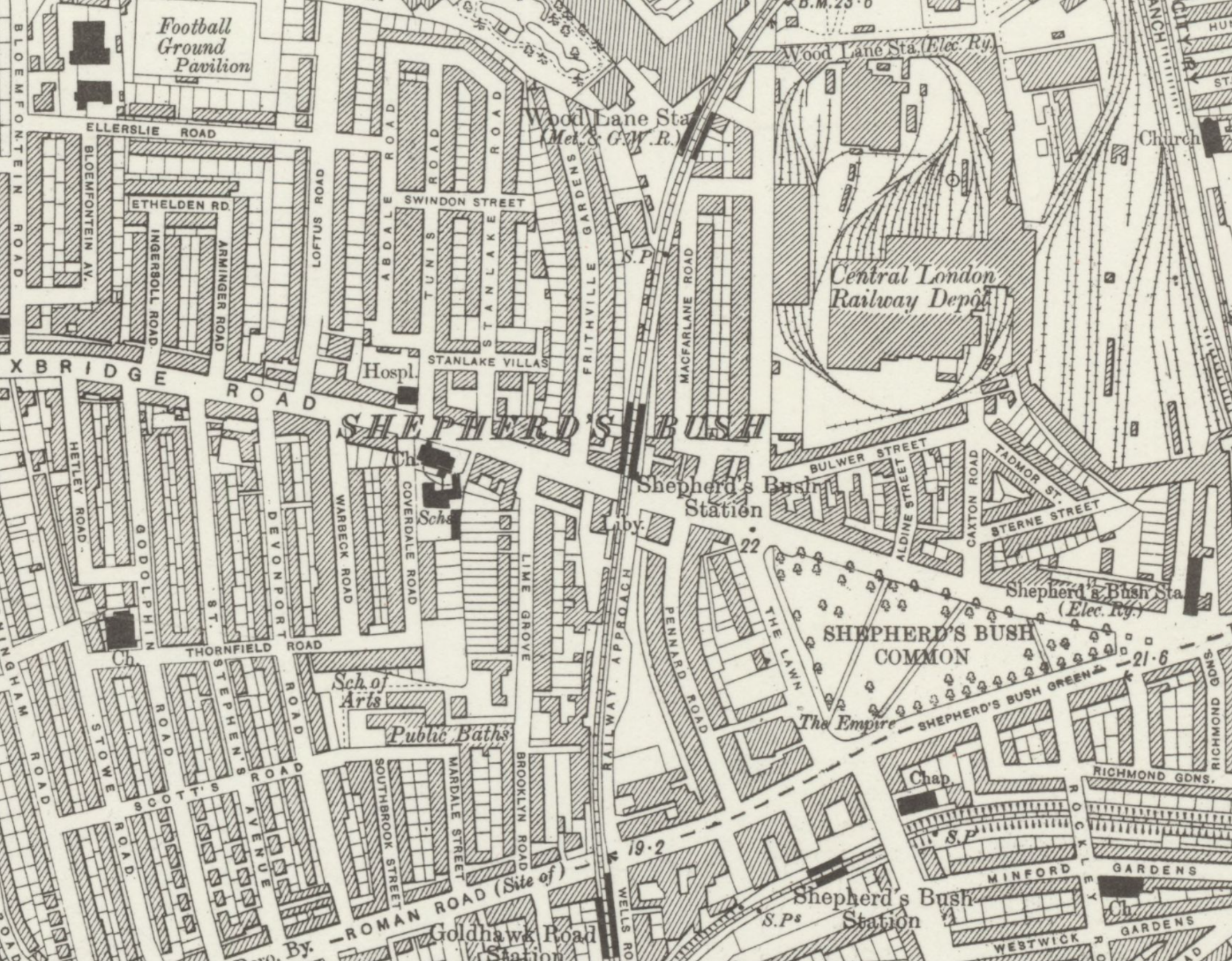
Lime Grove Baths Ordnance Survey 1912

=== Use ===
The baths had two swimming pools. The smaller was open all year round whereas the larger was open only during summer months. During the winter season, the larger pool was converted into a public hall for meetings, concerts, wrestling, dances, Badminton and indoor Bowls.

In 1908, the baths held their first swimming, diving and plunging Championship meeting.

In 1910, John Henry "Rob" Derbyshire, became manager of the baths in 1910. Soon after, in 1916, the Hammersmith Ladies Swimming Club was co-founded in 1916 by his wife Alice Derbyshire, who served as its honorary secretary for nearly 30 years and as president from 1945 to 1975. In 1921, Rob Derbyshire founded the Penguin Swimming Club. The Penguin Swimming Club held their fifth annual club championships gala at the baths in 1964.

In 1915, Lime Grove Studios was built opposite the baths.

During World War I, a Grand Christmas Fair was held at the baths in aid of prisoners of war. On 11 November 1918, a dance was held at the baths on Armistice Night.

The baths were the location for swimming and water polo competitions, including annual competitions for the Hammersmith Schools' Swimming Association (1919, 1920, 1921, 1934, 1935, 1966) and trials for the London Schools Swimming Association in 1935.

In 1948, recordings from the Championship All-Breed Cat Show held at the baths were broadcast on BBC Women's Hour.

In 1949, future President of Nigeria Nnamdi Azikiwe spoke at the Plenary Session of the British Peace Congress held at the baths, delivering the speech "A Denunciation of European Imperialism".

By 1962, the baths provided facilities for bathing, swimming and laundry. Private hot baths and shower cubicles were available with towels, soap, bath cubes and shampoos available for a small cost. There were concession rates for children and free baths on certain days for pensioners. The baths provided fully automatic washer-dryers and hand irons.

Swimming and boxing matches from the baths were regularly broadcast by the BBC, including an iconic fight between Mick McManus and Peter Preston in 1967.

The baths were a location for the baths scene in the 1979 film 'Quadrophenia'.

=== Closure ===
By 1980, the building's roof began to break away and the baths were closed down, following the opening of White City Pools in 1979. The pool hall and baths to the west were demolished and the entrance block on Lime Grove was sold to the Notting Hill Housing Trust by a conveyance dated 18 February 1982 and converted into flats.
