= Mabel Hamblen =

British swimmer (1904–1955)

Personal information
- Born: 19 September 1904 Fulham, London, England
- Died: 18 April 1955 (aged 50) Hammersmith, England

Sport
- Sport: Swimming
- Club: Hammersmith Ladies SC

Mabel Hamblen (19 September 1904 – 18 April 1955) was a British swimmer. She competed in the women's 200 metre breaststroke event at the 1928 Summer Olympics in Amsterdam. Hamblen was the first woman to win Long Distance Champion of England for three successive years (1926–1928), swimming five miles on the River Thames from Kew to Putney. She was a founding member of the Hammersmith Ladies Swimming Club, and once served as a captain.
