= Flyme (disambiguation) =

FlyMe was a low-cost airline based in Gothenburg, Sweden.

Flyme may also refer to:

- Villa Air, Maldivian airline launched in 2011 as Flyme
- Flyme OS, firmware for smartphones by Meizu

== See also ==
- Fly Me, United States–Filipino sexploitation film
- Lyme (disambiguation)
