= Glowie =

- Born: Sara Pétursdóttir; 26 March 1997 (age 29); Reykjavík, Iceland
- Genres: Pop
- Occupation: Singer
- Instrument: Vocals
- Years active: 2014–present
- Labels: Columbia; RCA
- Website: www.glowiemusic.com

Sara Pétursdóttir (born 26 March 1997), better known by her stage name Glowie, is an Icelandic singer.

== Early life ==
Glowie was born and raised in Reykjavik, Iceland. Glowie has said that living there she felt disconnected from the rest of the world. As a child, she painted, drew, danced and sang. She listened to RnB, including artists such as Destiny's Child, Alicia Keys, Outkast and Craig David, as well as teen pop, including artists such as Miley Cyrus and Taylor Swift. Her greatest musical inspiration was Alicia Keys. She was bullied at school, which has inspired the message of her singles "Body" and "Cruel".

== Career ==
=== 2014−2016: Career beginnings ===
In 2014, Glowie won the Singing Contest of Icelandic Junior Colleges. 11 record labels offered her contracts, but she asked them to wait for one or two years before signing her, so that she could develop as an artist.

On 10 April 2015, she released her debut single, "No More", through StopWaitGo. The song went on to become a hit, topping the charts in Iceland for 3 consecutive weeks. On 29 September 2015, Glowie released "Party". The song spent 10 weeks on the Icelandic singles chart, peaking at number 4.

On 13 February 2016, Glowie released the song "One Day". The song spent 6 weeks on the Icelandic singles chart, peaking at number 4. On 4 June 2016, she released the single "No Lie". The song spent 8 weeks on the Icelandic singles chart, including 2 weeks at number one. A music video for the song was released on 22 June 2016.

=== 2017−present: Columbia Records and Where I Belong EP ===
In February 2017, Glowie was named as one of the hottest Icelandic artists by Vice. In March 2017, it was announced that she had signed an international recording contract with Columbia Records and RCA Records.

On 27 October 2017, Glowie featured on iLL BLU's song "Tribalist (Get to Know)".

On 26 October 2018, Glowie released "Body", her first single on Columbia Records. The song was written by Julia Michaels, Justin Tranter, Mattias Larsson and Robin Fredriksson. A music video for the song was filmed in Malibu and was released on 16 November 2018. Glowie has said that the video features dancers of different body types and is intended to promote self-confidence and positivity.

On 22 March 2019, Glowie released the single "Cruel". The release was intended for 15 March 2019, but it was later delayed. The song was written by Tayla Parx and produced by Oscar Görres. Glowie has said "I want 'Cruel' to inspire anybody suffering hardship in the world to say to themselves, it's okay to not feel okay sometimes." In a positive review, Clash described the song as "a blistering pop statement, a ruthlessly executed mini-manifesto of divine digital sonics". A music video for the song was released on 28 March 2019.

In an interview with Official Charts Company in March 2019, Glowie said "We're just focusing on the first few singles at the moment. An album is still very important to me – it's just about tying everything together and figuring out what it should sound like. I don't want it to be a bunch of random songs that have no connection, they need to pull together and tell a story." In an interview with NME, she revealed that she is hoping to release an album in 2019 or early 2020, saying "I think it's going to be a mixed pop and R&B record but with a dark twist, darker themes."

On 14 June 2019, Glowie released her debut extended play Where I Belong. It featured the singles "Body" and "Cruel", as well as three new songs and three interludes. Glowie has said that the EP's five songs are all "very different", but that they all represent things that she has experienced and feels passionate about. On 24 June 2019, a music video for "I'm Good" was released.

On 8 November 2019, Glowie released the single "Unlovable", along with a music video directed by Sam Taylor. The song was written by Amanda Cygnaeus, Joel Sjöö and Philip Holmgren. Sjöö and Holmgren also produced the song, along with Cameron Gower Poole.

== Personal life ==
In 2018, Glowie moved from Iceland to London. She has ADHD and dyslexia.

== Discography ==
=== Extended plays ===
Title	Details	Track listing
Where I Belong	Released: 14 June 2019; Label: Columbia Records	1. Where I Belong; 2. They Don't Know You (Interlude); 3. Cruel; 4. !!! (Interlude); 5. Who's Gonna Stop Me; 6. Body; 7. Like We're All Supposed to Be the Same (Interlude); 8. I'm Good

=== Singles ===
Single	Year	Peak chart positions	Album/EP
Single	Year	ICE	Album/EP
"No More" (with Stony)	2015	1	Non-album singles
"Party"	2015	4	Non-album singles
"One Day"	2016	4	Non-album singles
"No Lie"	2016	1	Non-album singles
"Body"	2018	—	Where I Belong
"Cruel"	2019	—	Where I Belong
"I'm Good"	2019	—	Where I Belong
"Unlovable"	2019	—	Non-album singles
"Throwback"	2021	—	Non-album singles
"ADHD"	2021	—	Non-album singles
"Can't Get Enough"	2022	—	Non-album singles
"What I Gotta Do"	2022	—	Non-album singles
"—" denotes a recording that did not chart or was not released in that territory.

=== Guest appearances ===
Year	Title	Other artist(s)
2017	"Tribalist (Get to Know)"	iLL BLU

== Music videos ==
Title	Year	Director(s)	Ref.
"No More" (Lyric video)	2015	—	
"Party" (Lyric video)	2015	—	
"One Day" (Lyric video)	2016	Jakob Gabríel Þórhallsson	
"No Lie"	2016	Saga Sig	
"Body"	2018	Wendy Morgan	
"Cruel"	2019	—	
"I'm Good"	2019	Stella Asia Consonni	
"Unlovable"	2019	Sam Taylor	

== See also ==
- List of Icelandic singers
- List of Columbia Records artists
- List of RCA Records artists
- List of people with dyslexia
