= Esme Harris =

British diver (1932–2023)

Personal information
- Full name: Esme Gwyneth Harris
- Nationality: British
- Born: 20 October 1932 Headington, Oxford, England
- Died: 9 June 2023 (aged 90) Oxford, England

Sport
- Sport: Diving
- Club: Hammersmith Ladies SC

Esme Gibb (née Harris; 20 October 1932 – 9 June 2023) was a British diver. She competed in the women's 3 metre springboard event at the 1948 Summer Olympics and was the youngest British Olympian that year at the age of fifteen.

== Early life and training ==
Harris grew up in Oxford, and started diving from the age of six, with her father Evan Harris as her coach. She trained at Temple Cowley Pools daily after school. She first started competing as a freestyle swimmer, and also did gymnastics. At the age of 13, she tied for first place in the junior 100 yard swim race, in a dead heat during the 1946 Oxford County Championships.

== Diving career ==
Harris became the senior Oxford County springboard diving champion in 1947. In July of that year, she also entered the national Women's Springboard Championship at St. Leonards, and placed last. According to the Daily Mirror, Harris '"failed badly on two of her dives", causing the crowds to "[raise] their eyebrows" and groan in disappointment. Afterwards, upon learning that Harris was only 14 years old and had decided to "have a go" at the senior competition because there was no competition at the junior level, "she got a special cheer all to herself" and was lifted up high by a group of male divers to celebrate her attempt.

The year before the Olympics, she traveled from Oxford to London on Saturdays to train with Millie Hudson and competed as part of the Hammersmith Ladies Swimming Club.

In July 1948, she placed first in the women's indoor springboard diving trials in Blackpool, securing her place on the British Olympic diving team just one month before the start of the Olympic Games in London. Harris placed 13th in the women's springboard competition at the Olympics. Only 15 years old, Esme Harris received extensive media coverage both nationally and internationally.

A French coach, Andrew Henry Caza, said of her performance at the 1948 Olympics, "Esme Harris is a real prospect for 1952. She is well-trained to get good height on her take-offs, and has steady balance and timing. She needs now to work on neater entries, with a better foot stretch, but she is very young and will gain this with experience."

== Personal life ==
In 1953, she married Jack Gibb, who was also a diver and gymnast. As an adult, she worked at Pressed Steel and at several schools as a dinner lady. As of 2012, she had six grandchildren. She died in Oxford on 9 June 2023, at the age of 90.
