= Buss It =

2020 Single by Erica Banks

Single by Erica Banks

from the album Erica Banks
- Released: May 15, 2020
- Recorded: December 2019
- Genre: Dirty rap
- Length: 3:07
- Label: 1501 Certified; Warner
- Songwriters: Erica Banks; Jeremy Blackwell; Nelly; Pharrell Williams; Chad Hugo; Chuck Brown
- Producer: Sgt. J

Erica Banks singles chronology
| "MZ E (Diss)" (2020) | "Buss It" (2020) | "Toot That" (2021) |

Music video
- "Buss It" on YouTube

"Buss It" is a song recorded by American rapper Erica Banks. Written by Banks and produced by Sgt. J, the song was released on May 15, 2020, through 1501 Certified Entertainment and later through Warner Records as the lead single from Banks's self-titled fourth mixtape. It became popular on the video-sharing platform TikTok in early 2021 and peaked at number 47 on the Billboard Hot 100 chart. A remix featuring American rapper and singer Travis Scott was released in February 2021.

== Composition ==
"Buss It" is a dirty rap song, which begins with a sample from American rapper Nelly's 2002 song "Hot in Herre" (Note: Which itself samples "Bustin' Loose" by Chuck Brown, hence he also gets songwriting credit on this song.) in which Nelly sings, "Checkin' your reflection and tellin' your best friend/Like, 'Girl, I think my butt gettin' big'", which then transitions into the song's "trap-heavy" chorus over a repetition of the sample. The Dallas Observer's Alex Gonzalez described the song as "an ass-shaking strip club anthem".

== Background ==
"Buss It" was recorded in December 2019 by Banks with producer Sgt. J. Although Banks was originally hesitant to release it, stating that she "didn't like the song", she eventually released it in June 2020 after being encouraged by Sgt. J and her friends.

=== TikTok challenge ===
A social media challenge using "Buss It" was created on video-sharing platform TikTok by user Erika Davila in early January 2021. The "Buss It" challenge begins with users wearing no makeup and everyday clothing before another clip plays which shows them in makeup "dropping it down low" and twerking. The challenge was recreated by musicians and actors. Harper's Bazaar cited it as the first major TikTok trend of 2021, where it has seen over 5.5 million videos on the platform.

== Commercial performance ==
"Buss It" debuted on the R&B/Hip-Hop Airplay chart in August 2020 at number 38, peaking at number 1. The song debuted on the Billboard Hot 100 at number 100 five months later in January 2021 as a result of its viral popularity. The song also topped both the Billboard Top Triller U.S. and Top Triller Global charts. The song was certified gold by the Recording Industry Association of America (RIAA) in 2021.

== Charts ==
=== Weekly charts ===
Weekly chart performance for "Buss It"
| Chart (2021) | Peak position |
|---|---|
| Canada (Canadian Hot 100) | 1 |
| New Zealand Hot Singles (RMNZ) | 23 |
| US Billboard Hot 100 | 47 |
| US Hot R&B/Hip-Hop Songs (Billboard) | 1 |
| US Rhythmic (Billboard) | 1 |

=== Year-end charts ===
Year-end chart performance for "Buss It"
| Chart (2021) | Position |
|---|---|
| US Hot R&B/Hip-Hop Songs (Billboard) | 1 |

== Certifications ==
| Region | Certification | Certified units/sales |
|---|---|---|
| New Zealand (RMNZ) | Gold | 15,000^{‡} |
| United States (RIAA) | Platinum | 1,000,000^{‡} |
^{‡} Sales+streaming figures based on certification alone.

== Remix ==
"Buss It (Remix)"

Single by Erica Banks featuring Travis Scott
- Released: February 11, 2021
- Genre: Dirty rap
- Length: 3:07
- Label: 1501 Certified; Warner
- Songwriters: Erica Banks; Jeremy Blackwell; Cornell Haynes; Pharrell Williams; Chad Hugo; Charles Brown; D. Ford; E. Breaux; Jacques Webster
- Producer: Sgt. J

Erica Banks singles chronology
| "Bounce" (2021) | "Buss It (Remix)" (2021) | "Jitterbugs" (2021) |

Travis Scott singles chronology
| "Goosebumps (Remix)" (2021) | "Buss It (Remix)" (2021) | "Durag Activity" (2021) |

A remix of "Buss It" featuring vocals from American rapper Travis Scott was released on February 11, 2021. A teaser for the remix was posted by Banks to her Twitter account hours before its release. The remix begins with a new verse from Scott with autotuned vocals and ad-libs in which he raps about spending money on expensive items and women and references stock prices and American rapper Roddy Ricch.

=== Critical reception ===
Billboard's Jason Lipshutz wrote that, on the remix, "Scott puts in extra work, sounding exuberant in the remix’s first half", while Rap-Up called the verse "infectious". Uproxx's Aaron Williams wrote that "the track actually works with Travis on it, and he brings every bit as much energy as his host."

== Release history ==
| Region | Date | Version | Format | Label | Ref. |
|---|---|---|---|---|---|
| Various | May 15, 2020 | Original | Digital download; streaming | 1501 Entertainment; Warner | |
| Various | February 11, 2021 | Remix | Digital download; streaming | 1501 Entertainment; Warner | |
