= Lime Grove =

Lime Grove may refer to:

- Lime Grove, Nebraska, U.S.
- Lime Grove Baths, a public bath and wash house in Shepherd's Bush, London, England, 1907–1980
- Lime Grove Studios, a film and television studio complex in Shepherd's Bush, London, England, 1915–1991
- RAF Lime Grove or RAF Eastcote, a military facility in Eastcote, Middlesex, England, 1943–2007
