= Eugenie Briollet =

French diver (1900–1985)

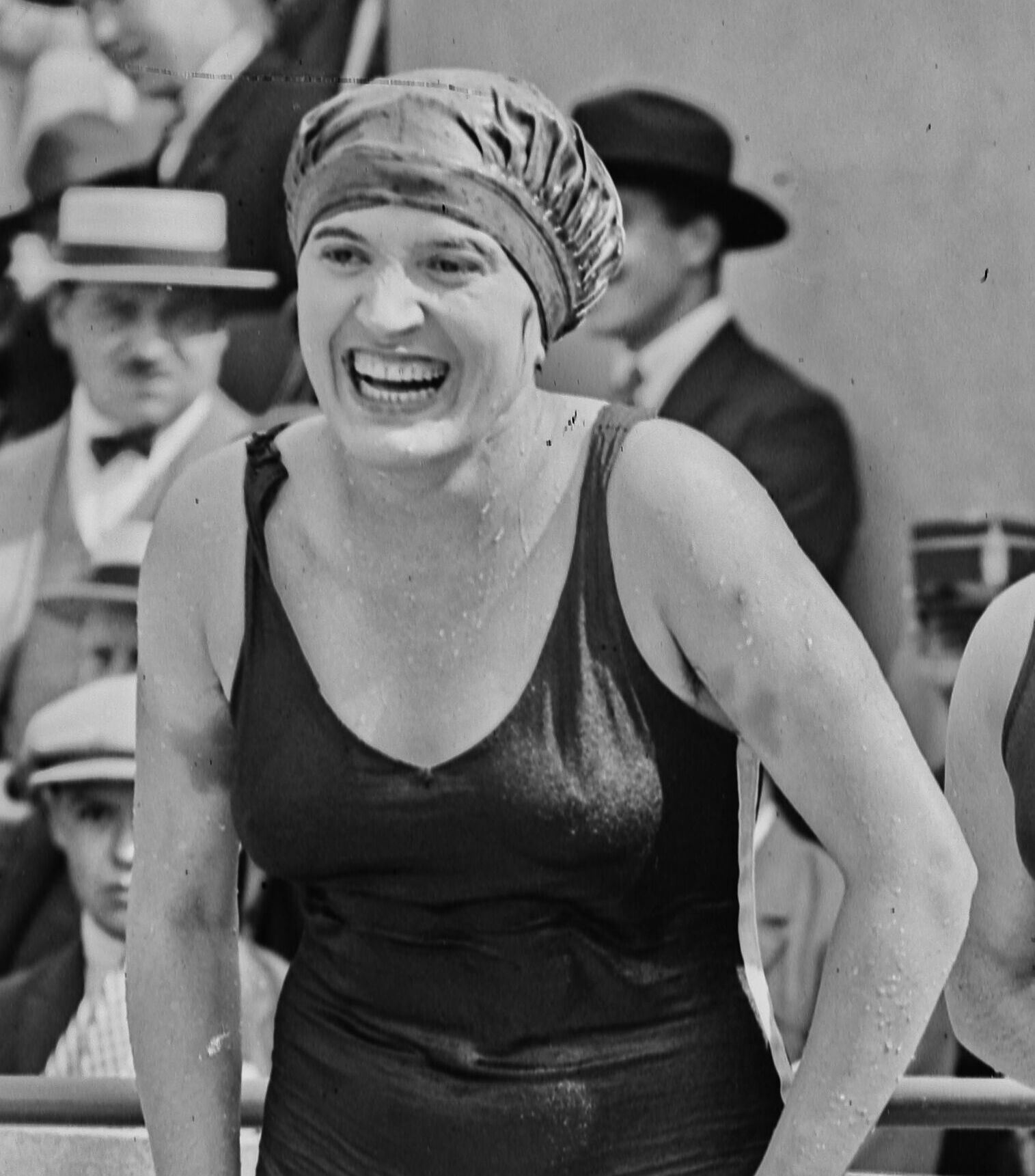
- Eugenie Briollet in 1924

Personal information
- Nationality: French
- Born: 7 November 1900; Strasbourg, France
- Died: 1 May 1985 (aged 84); Brumath, France

Sport
- Sport: Diving

Eugenie Briollet (7 November 1900 – 1 May 1985) was a French diver. She competed in the women's 3 metre springboard event at the 1924 Summer Olympics.
