= Ron Turner (water polo) =

British water polo player

Personal information
- Born: June 11, 1927; Notting Hill, London, England
- Died: October 12, 2007 (aged 80); Acton, London, England

Sport
- Sport: Water polo

Ronald Frederick "Ron" Turner (11 June 1927 – 12 October 2007) was a renowned British water polo player and Olympian.

Ron Turner played for Penguin Swimming Club, a water polo club based in West London, and represented Great Britain in the 1948 Summer Olympics as a reserve, in London, the 1952 Summer Olympics, in Helsinki, Finland, and the 1956 Summer Olympics, in Melbourne, Australia. At the Melbourne Games, he was chosen as part of the 'best of the rest of the World' team that played against the Olympic Champions, Hungary.

Subsequently, Ron Turner was involved in the organisation of competitive British water polo. He remained an active swimmer and trained regularly in the Masters section of the West London Penguin Swimming and Water Polo Club, a descendant of The Penguins, until his death.

Ron Turner was killed in a road traffic accident in Acton, West London, while cycling. He was 80 years old. His funeral took place on 24 October 2007 at Mortlake Crematorium and was attended by more than 100 people.
