= Lime Ridge =

Lime Ridge or Limeridge may refer to:

== Canada ==
- Lime Ridge Mall, Hamilton, Ontario
- Limeridge Road (Hamilton, Ontario)

== United States ==
=== Settlements ===
- Lime Ridge, Pennsylvania
- Lime Ridge, Wisconsin

=== Geographic features ===
- A prominent foothill ridge of Mount Diablo in California
- An anticline in Utah forming part of the Monument Upwarp

== See also ==
- Lime Creek (disambiguation)
- Lime (disambiguation)
