= Francesca Snell =

New Zealand and British water polo player

Personal information
- Born: 28 March 1987 (age 38); Auckland, New Zealand

Sport
- Sport: Water polo

Francesca Snell, also known as Francesca Painter-Snell, (born 28 March 1987) is a New Zealand and British water polo player. She competed for the New Zealand women's national water polo team at the 2007 World Aquatics Championships and for Great Britain in the women's tournament at the 2012 Summer Olympics. This was the first ever Olympic GB women's water polo team.

She is a member of the West London Penguin Swimming and Water Polo Club.
