= Suzanne Raeth =

French diver

Personal information
- Nationality: French
- Born: 22 March 1905; Colmar, France
- Died: 26 March 2001 (aged 96); Colmar, France

Sport
- Sport: Diving

Suzanne Raeth (22 March 1905 – 26 March 2001) was a French diver. She competed in the women's 3 metre springboard event at the 1924 Summer Olympics.
