= Hendrika Bante =

Dutch diver (1901–1982)

Personal information
- Nationality: Dutch
- Born: 14 April 1901; Amsterdam, Netherlands
- Died: 26 March 1982 (aged 80); Doorn, Netherlands

Sport
- Sport: Diving

Hendrika Bante (14 April 1901 – 26 March 1982) was a Dutch diver. She competed in the women's 3 metre springboard event at the 1924 Summer Olympics.
