= Aloisie Krongeigerová =

Czech diver

Personal information
- Nationality: Czech
- Born: 15 January 1900

Sport
- Sport: Diving

Aloisie Krongeigerová (born 15 January 1900, date of death unknown) was a Czech diver. She competed in the women's 3 metre springboard event at the 1924 Summer Olympics.
