= Lime Creek =

Lime Creek may refer to:

== Populated places ==
- Lime Creek Township, Cerro Gordo County, Iowa
- Lime Creek Township, Washington County, Iowa
- Lime Creek, Michigan
- Lime Creek, Minnesota

== Streams ==
- Lime Creek (Winnebago River)
- Lime Creek (Des Moines River)

== Other uses ==
- Lime Creek Observatory

== See also ==
- Lime Kiln Creek
- Lime Ridge (disambiguation)
- Lime (disambiguation)
