= Dora Gibbs =

British swimmer

Personal information
- Born: 6 July 1910 London, England
- Died: 4 July 2008 (aged 97)

Sport
- Sport: Swimming

Dora Elizabeth Gibbs (6 July 1910 – 4 July 2008) was a British swimmer. She competed in the women's 200 metre breaststroke event at the 1928 Summer Olympics.

Gibbs, a member of the Hammersmith Ladies Swimming Club, was a 17-year old working at Selfridges when she won the Olympic trial to represent Great Britain at the 1928 Summer Olympics.
