= John Budd (water polo) =

British water polo player (1899–1952)

Personal information
- Nationality: British
- Born: 16 March 1899; Fulham, England
- Died: 16 March 1952 (aged 53); Westminster, England

Sport
- Sport: Water polo
- Club: Penguin SC

John Budd (16 March 1899 – 16 March 1952) was a British water polo player. He competed at the 1924 Summer Olympics and the 1928 Summer Olympics.
