= Eric MacDonald =

British diver

Personal information
- Nationality: British
- Born: 22 November 1900; London, Great Britain
- Died: 17 February 1967 (aged 66); Clacton-on-Sea, Great Britain

Sport
- Sport: Diving

Eric Malcolm MacDonald (22 November 1900 – 17 February 1967) was a British diver. He competed in two events at the 1924 Summer Olympics.
