= Lake Lime (Wisconsin) =

Lake in the state of Wisconsin, United States

- Lime Lake
- Location within Wisconsin Location within the United States
- Location: Portage County, Wisconsin
- Coordinates: 44°25′15″N 89°20′42″W
- Type: lake
- Etymology: deposits of lime which were processed in a lakeside lime kiln
- Basin countries: United States
- Surface elevation: 322 m (1,056 ft)

Lake Lime is a lake in the U.S. state of Wisconsin.

A variant name is "Lime Lake". Lake Lime was named for deposits of lime which were processed in a lakeside lime kiln.
