= Stanley C. Mercer =

British diver

Personal information
- Full name: Stanley Charles Mercer
- Nationality: British
- Born: 24 December 1903; Hammersmith, London, Great Britain
- Died: 17 October 1973 (aged 69); Truro, Great Britain

Sport
- Sport: Diving

Stanley Charles Mercer (24 December 1903 – 17 October 1973) was a British diver. He competed in the men's 3 metre springboard event at the 1928 Summer Olympics.
