= British swimming champions – relay winners =

British swimming event

The British swimming champions in the relays, formerly the (Amateur Swimming Association (ASA) National Championships) are listed below.

The events were originally contested over yards and then switched to the metric conversion of metres in 1971.

4 x 100 metres freestyle relay
Year	Men's champion	Women's champion
	4 x 110 yards	4 x 110 yards
1950	not contested	Croydon Ladies
1951	not contested	Croydon Ladies
1952	not contested	Mermaid
1953	not contested	Mermaid
1954	Coventry	Mermaid
1955	Otter (London)	Leander
1956		
1957	Otter (London)	Kingston Ladies
1958	York City	Kingston Ladies
1959	York City	Beckenham
1960	Stoke Newington	Mermaid
1961	York City	Hampstead Ladies
1962	York City	Hampstead Ladies
1963	York City	Hampstead Ladies
1964	York City	Stoke Newington
1965	York City	Hampstead Ladies
1966	York City	Kingston
1967	Otter (London)	Beckenham
1968	Southampton	Beckenham
1969	Southampton	Beckenham
1970	Southampton	Hornchurch
	4 x 100 metres	4 x 100 metres
1971	Nottingham Northern	Havering
1972	Southampton	Cheam
1973	Southampton	Havering
1974	Bedford Modernians	Paisley
1975		
1976	Bedford Modernians	Cardiff
1977	Southampton	Millfield
1978	Beckenham	Cardiff
1979		
1980	Beckenham	
1981	Southampton	Wigan Wasps
1982	Barnet Copthall	Williams Wigan Wasps
1983	Barnet Copthall	Millfield
1984	Barnet Copthall	City of Manchester
1985	Barnet Copthall	Stockport Metro
1986	Millfield	Wigan Wasps
1987	City of Birmingham	Wigan Wasps
1988	City of Birmingham	Wigan Wasps
1989	City of Leeds	City of Birmingham
1990	Barnet Copthall	
1991	City of Leeds	Nova Centurion
1992	Barnet Copthall	Nova Centurion
1993	City of Sheffield	Nova Centurion
1994	City of Sheffield	Portsmouth Northsea
1995	City of Sheffield	City of Leeds
1996	Bristol	Bradford
1997	Portsmouth Northsea	City of Leeds
1998	University of Bath	City of Leeds
1999	University of Bath	University of Bath
2006	Galica (Lancashire)	Beckenham
2007	Bolton Metro	Beckenham
2009	Millfield School	City of Sheffield
2013	Nova Centurion	Plymouth Leander
2015	Millfield School	Plymouth Leander
2016	Millfield School	Stockport Metro
2017	Loughborough University	City of Sheffield
2018	Stockport Metro	Ealing
2019	Loughborough University	Loughborough University

4 x 100 metres medley relay
Year	Men's champion	Women's champion
	4 x 110 yards	4 x 110 yards
1949	Otter (London)+	not contested
1950	Otter (London)+	not contested
1951	Penguin SC (London)+	Croydon Ladies
1952	Penguin SC (London)	Mermaid
1953	Otter (London)	Mermaid
1954	Otter (London)	Mermaid
1955	Otter (London)	Mermaid
1956		
1957	Otter (London)	Heston
1958	Stoke Newington	Heston
1959	Stoke Newington	Heston
1960	Stoke Newington	Heston
1961	Otter (London)	Heston
1962	York City	Hampstead Ladies
1963	York City	Hampstead Ladies
1964	Otter (London)	Beckenham
1965	Barracuda	Beckenham
1966	Stoke Newington	Beckenham
1967	Stoke Newington	Beckenham
1968	Southampton	York City
1969	Southampton	Hartlepool
1970	Southampton	Beckenham
	4 x 100 metres	4 x 100 metres
1971	Nottingham Northern	Southampton
1972	Southampton	Southampton
1973	Southampton	Beckenham
1974	Millfield	Beckenham
1975		
1976	Southampton	Coventry
1977	Southampton	Coventry
1978	Beckenham	Beckenham
1979		
1980	Beckenham	Wigan Wasps
1981	Southampton	Wigan Wasps
1982	Southampton	Williams Wigan Wasps
1983	City of Leeds	Wigan Wasps
1984	Salford	Millfield
1985	City of Leeds	Wigan Wasps
1986	City of Leeds	Wigan Wasps
1987	City of Birmingham	Stockport Metro
1988	Beckenham	Norwich Penguins
1989	City of Leeds	Wigan Wasps
1990		City of Southampton
1991	Portsmouth Northsea	City of Southampton
1992	City of Leeds	Portsmouth Northsea
1993	City of Leeds	Nova Centurion
1994	City of Leeds	Portsmouth Northsea
1995	City of Birmingham	City of Leeds
1996	City of Leeds	City of Leeds
1997	Loughborough University	Portsmouth Northsea
1998	University of Bath	University of Bath
1999	University of Bath	University of Bath
2006	Millfield School	Nova Centurion
2007	Millfield School	Nova Centurion
2009	Plymouth Leander	Guildford City
2013	Plymouth Leander	Plymouth Leander
2015	Plymouth Leander	Stockport Metro
2016	Plymouth Leander	Stockport Metro
2017	Loughborough University	Loughborough University
2018	City of Sheffield	Stockport Metro
2019	Loughborough University	Loughborough University

+mixture of 110 and 220 yards

4 x 200 metres freestyle relay
Year	Men's champion	Women's champion
	4 x 220 yards	4 x 220 yards
1951	Sparkhill	not contested
1952	Sparkhill	not contested
1953	Sparkhill	not contested
	4 x 200 metres	4 x 200 metres
1994	City of Leeds	Portsmouth Northsea
1995	City Of Leeds	Portsmouth Northsea
1996	City of Leeds	Bradford
1997	City of Leeds	City of Leeds
1998	University of Bath	City of Leeds
1999	University of Bath	City of Leeds
2006	Kingston upon Hull	Ealing
2007	Derventio Excel	City of Sheffield
2009	Gallica (Lancashire)	City of Sheffield
2013	City of Sheffield	Plymouth Leander
2015	City of Sheffield	City of Sheffield
2016	City of Sheffield	Stockport Metro
2017	City of Sheffield	City of Sheffield
2018	Royal Wolverhampton	Stockport Metro
2019	Loughborough University	City of Sheffield

== See also ==
- Aquatics GB
- List of British Swimming champions
