= Lime Street =

Lime Street may refer to:

== Places ==
- Lime Street, London, a street in the City of London, England
- Lime Street (ward), a ward in the City of London
- Lime Street, Liverpool, a street in Liverpool, England
- Liverpool Lime Street railway station, the main station in the city of Liverpool, England
- Lime Street, Sydney, a street in Sydney, Australia

== Television ==
- Lime Street (TV series), a 1985 U.S. television series starring Robert Wagner and Samantha Smith

== Other ==
- Lime Street fire, a deadly fire in Jacksonville, Florida, and the subsequent test fires which demonstrated that arson investigators were wrong
