= New Lyme =

New Lyme may refer to:

- New Lyme Township, Ashtabula County, Ohio
- New Lyme, Wisconsin
