= Lime Lake (Sarasota, Florida) =

Lake in Florida, United States

- Whitehead Pond
- Interactive map of Lime Lake
- Location: Sarasota, Florida, United States
- Coordinates: 27°21′18″N 82°31′25″W
- Type: artificial lake
- Surface area: 2.87 acres (1.16 ha)

Whitehead Pond, known as Lime Lake, is an artificial 3-acre (1.2 ha) freshwater pond initially built as a stormwater pond to reduce flooding in the surrounding area. The pond lies at the easternmost edge of 22nd Street in Sarasota, Florida. The pond and its surrounding acreage were originally purchased by Wilmon Whitehead after he returned from World War II in 1947, where he raised his family.

Wilmon Whitehead sold the pond and many other acres to Sarasota County. The county redeveloped much of the land, built a school, and made the pond and surrounding area into a county-owned park known as Lime Lake Park. The Whitehead family still owns much of the land that wraps around Lime Lake. The original home that Wilmon Whitehead built still sits on the shore of the lake.
