= Cicely O'Bryen =

British diver

Personal information
- Nationality: British
- Born: 7 September 1899 Hampstead, Great Britain
- Died: 17 March 1984 (aged 84) Watlington, Great Britain

Sport
- Sport: Diving

Catherine Cicely O'Bryen (7 September 1899 – 17 March 1984) was a British diver. She competed in the women's 3 metre springboard event at the 1924 Summer Olympics.
