= Wilfred Burne =

British diver (1903-1989)

Personal information
- Nationality: British
- Born: 13 May 1903
- Died: 12 August 1989 (aged 86); Wimbledon, England

Sport
- Sport: Diving

Wilfred Burne (13 May 1903 – 12 August 1989) was a British diver. He competed in the men's 10 metre platform event at the 1928 Summer Olympics.
