= Limay (disambiguation) =

Limay is a municipality of Bataan, the Philippines.

Limay may also refer to:

- Limay, Yvelines, a commune of France
  - Canton of Limay
- Limay River, a river in Argentina

== See also ==
- Limay formation, a geologic formation in Argentina
- Limay Mahuida, a village in Argentina
- Limay Refinery, an oil refinery in the Philippines
- Limey
- San Juan de Limay, a municipality in Nicaragua
