= Gladys Luscombe =

British diver

Personal information
- Nationality: British
- Born: 13 November 1908; Newton Abbot, England
- Died: 6 June 1946 (aged 37); Torquay, England

Sport
- Sport: Diving

Gladys Luscombe (13 November 1908 – 6 June 1946) was a British diver. She competed in the women's 3 metre springboard event at the 1924 Summer Olympics.
