= Lime Lake (Washington) =

- Location within Washington (state)
- Location: Pend Oreille County, Washington
- Coordinates: 48°52′27″N 117°20′15″W
- Type: lake
- Basin countries: United States
- Surface elevation: 2,560 ft (780 m)

Lime Lake is a lake in the U.S. state of Washington.

Lime Lake was named for the lime sediment it contains.

== See also ==
- List of lakes in Washington
