= Glyme =

Glyme may refer to:

- Any of the E-series glycol ethers (glymes), a class of solvents
- Dimethoxyethane (glyme), the simplest glycol ether
- River Glyme, a river in Oxfordshire, England
