= Signe Johansson-Engdahl =

Swedish diver (1905–2010)

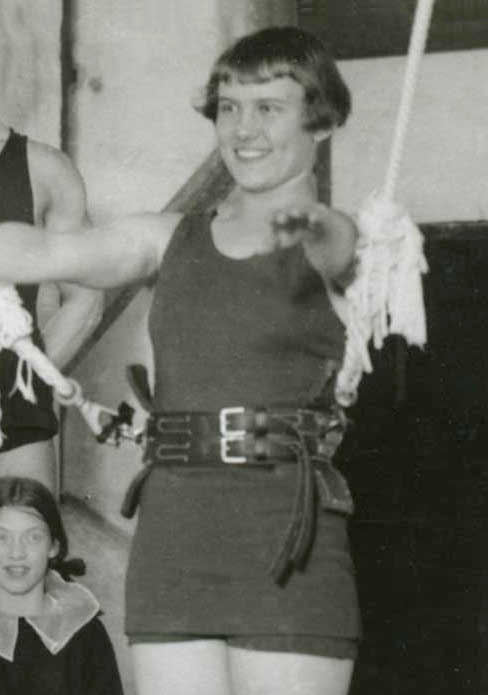

Personal information
- Full name: Signe Dagmar Charlotta Johansson-Engdahl
- Nationality: Swedish
- Born: 27 May 1905 Stockholm, Sweden
- Died: 9 May 2010 (aged 104) Stockholm, Sweden

Sport
- Sport: Diving
- Club: Stockholms KK

Signe Dagmar Charlotta Johansson-Engdahl (27 May 1905 – 9 May 2010) was a Swedish diver. She competed at the 1924 Summer Olympics in the 3 m springboard and placed fifth. From the death of Erna Sondheim on 9 January 2008 until her own death, she was believed to be the oldest living person to have competed in the Olympic games. She was married to the Olympic runner Nils Engdahl, and her sister-in-law Märta Johansson was also an Olympic diver.
