= Märta Johansson (diver) =

Swedish diver (1907–1998)

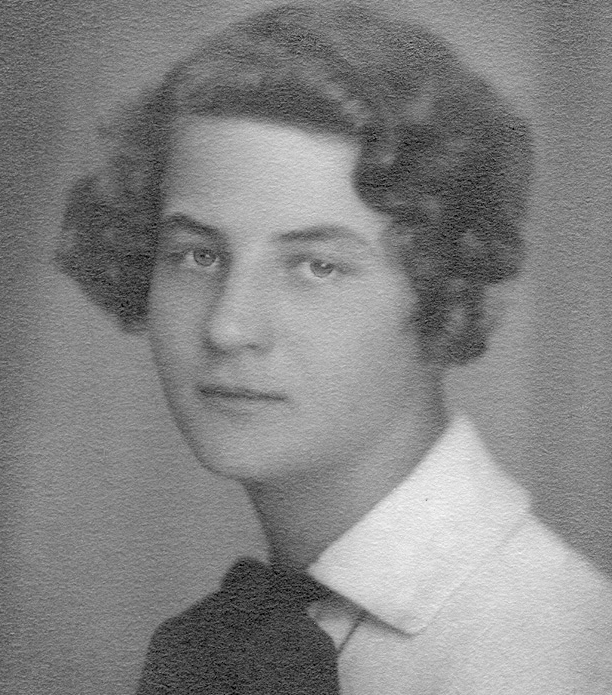

Personal information
- Born: 24 January 1907 Stockholm, Sweden
- Died: 6 January 1998 (aged 90) Sköndal, Stockholm, Sweden

Sport
- Sport: Diving
- Club: Stockholms KK

Märta Ester Lovisa Johansson (later Engdahl, 24 January 1907 – 6 January 1998) was a Swedish diver. She competed in the 3 m springboard at the 1924 Summer Olympics, but failed to reach the final. Her sister-in-law Signe Johansson-Engdahl was also an Olympic diver, and her elder brother Nils Johansson was an Olympic ice hockey player.
