= Gregory Matveieff =

British diver

Personal information
- Nationality: British
- Born: 25 October 1901 Westminster, England
- Died: 15 August 1965 (aged 63) Bristol, England

Sport
- Sport: Diving

Gregory Matveieff (25 October 1901 – 15 August 1965) was a British diver. He competed in the men's 3 metre springboard event at the 1924 Summer Olympics.
