= Terry Miller (water polo) =

British water polo player (1932–2014)

Personal information
- Full name: Terence Charles Miller
- Nationality: British
- Born: 2 March 1932 Lambeth, London, England
- Died: 7 May 2014 (aged 82)

Sport
- Sport: Water polo

Terence Charles Miller (2 March 1932 – 7 May 2014) was a British water polo player. He competed at the 1952 Summer Olympics and the 1956 Summer Olympics. Miller died on 7 May 2014, at the age of 82.
