= Lime Lake Township, Murray County, Minnesota =

Lime Lake Township, Minnesota
- Township
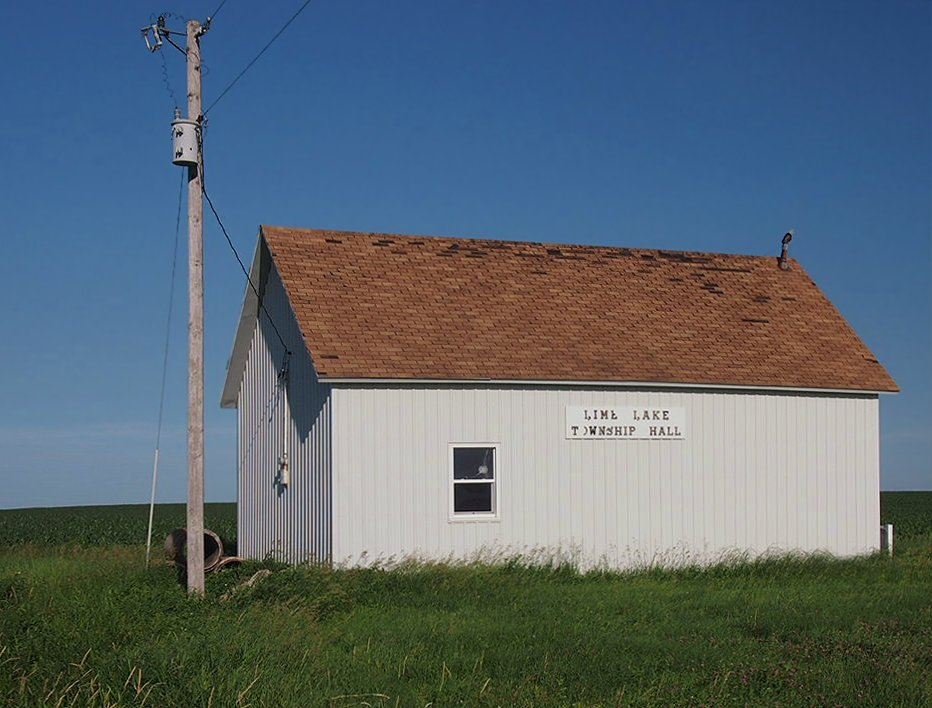
- Lime Lake Township Hall

- Location within the state of Minnesota Lime Lake Township, Minnesota (the United States)
- Coordinates: 43°58′16″N 95°39′10″W
- Country: United States
- State: Minnesota
- County: Murray

Area
  - Total: 34.9 sq mi (90.4 km^{2})
  - Land: 34.5 sq mi (89.3 km^{2})
  - Water: 0.46 sq mi (1.2 km^{2})
- Elevation: 1,555 ft (474 m)

Population (2000)
  - Total: 225
  - Density: 6.5/sq mi (2.5/km^{2})
- Time zone: UTC-6 (Central (CST))
  - Summer (DST): UTC-5 (CDT)
- FIPS code: 27-37088
- GNIS feature ID: 0664783

Lime Lake Township is a township in Murray County, Minnesota, United States. The population was 225 at the 2000 census.

Lime Lake Township was organized in 1873, and named after Lime Lake.

== Geography ==
According to the United States Census Bureau, the township has a total area of 34.9 square miles (90 km^{2}), of which 34.5 square miles (89 km^{2}) is land and 0.4 square miles (1.0 km^{2}) (1.29%) is water.

== Demographics ==
As of the census of 2000, there were 225 people, 85 households, and 61 families residing in the township. The population density was 6.5 inhabitants per square mile (2.5/km^{2}). There were 91 housing units at an average density of 2.6 per square mile (1.0/km^{2}). The racial makeup of the township was 96.44% White, 0.44% Asian, and 3.11% from two or more races. Hispanic or Latino of any race were 0.44% of the population.

There were 85 households, out of which 42.4% had children under the age of 18 living with them, 63.5% were married couples living together, 4.7% had a female householder with no husband present, and 28.2% were non-families. 24.7% of all households were made up of individuals, and 11.8% had someone living alone who was 65 years of age or older. The average household size was 2.65 and the average family size was 3.18.

In the township the population was spread out, with 32.0% under the age of 18, 2.2% from 18 to 24, 33.8% from 25 to 44, 18.7% from 45 to 64, and 13.3% who were 65 years of age or older. The median age was 38 years. For every 100 females, there were 122.8 males. For every 100 females age 18 and over, there were 121.7 males.

The median income for a household in the township was $37,500, and the median income for a family was $41,563. Males had a median income of $27,500 versus $20,625 for females. The per capita income for the township was $14,354. About 3.8% of families and 7.8% of the population were below the poverty line, including 5.7% of those under the age of eighteen and 10.7% of those 65 or over.

== Politics ==
Lime Lake Township is located in Minnesota's 1st congressional district, represented by Mankato educator Tim Walz, a Democrat. At the state level, Lime Lake Township is located in Senate District 22, represented by Republican Doug Magnus, and in House District 22A, represented by Republican Joe Schomacker.
