= Limey (band) =

English pop-rock band

Limey was a mid-1970s English pop/rock band. They released two albums, Limey and Silver Eagle in the UK on RCA Records. They toured with Andy Fairweather Low in 1976.

== Members ==
At the time of the release of their self-titled debut album, The band comprised Brian Engel (guitar, vocals), Robin Le Mesurier (guitar, Moog synthesizer), Dave Bowker (bass guitar, harmonica, formerly of Eclection and Swampfox), Ian Kewley (keyboards and Moog, formerly of Samson and Strider), and Mac McInerney (drums and percussion). It is also known that Garth Watt-Roy featured as part of the collective during some point in their timeline. B.J. Cole played the steel guitar on their first album, and Jim Rodford and Bob Henrit appeared on their second album, Silver Eagle.

After the band split up, Bowker briefly joined Kenny. Kewley and Watt-Roy joined Q-Tips, where Kewley formed a songwriting partnership with Paul Young, which continued into the latter's solo career.

== Musical style ==
The band's music had elements of American country-rock, but comparisons were also drawn to early Genesis.

== Discography ==
=== Albums ===
- 1975: Limey
- 1977: Silver Eagle

=== Singles ===
- 1975: "Georgia Moon"
- 1976: "Both in Love with You"
- 1977: "Silver Eagle"
