= John Derbyshire (swimmer) =

British swimmer

Personal information
- Full name: John Henry Derbyshire
- Nickname: "Rob"
- National team: Great Britain
- Born: 28 November 1878 Chorlton-cum-Hardy, England
- Died: 25 November 1938 (aged 59) St Pancras, London, England

Sport
- Sport: Swimming
- Strokes: Freestyle, water polo
- Club: Osborne Swimming Club
Medal record
Men's swimming
Representing Great Britain
Olympic Games
Gold medal – first place	1908 London	4×200 m freestyle
Intercalated Games
Bronze medal – third place	1906 Athens	4×250 m freestyle relay

John Henry "Rob" Derbyshire (29 November 1878 – 25 November 1938) was an English freestyle swimmer and water polo player from Chorlton, Lancashire, who competed in the 1900 Summer Olympics (maybe), 1906 Intercalated Games, 1908 Summer Olympics and 1912 Summer Olympics. He and Alice Derbyshire founded swimming clubs in Hammersmith.

== Life ==
At the 1906 Intercalated Games in Athens, Derbyshire won a bronze medal as a member of the British 4×250 metre freestyle relay team and also competed in the 100 metre freestyle and 400 metre freestyle events. Two years later, in London, he won a gold medal as a member of the British 4×200 metre freestyle relay team and was second in his heat of 100 metre freestyle and did not advance. Four years later, in Stockholm, he was third in his heat of 100 metre freestyle and did not advance. The International Olympic Committee credits him with a gold medal in water polo at the 1900 Summer Olympics, but this is incorrect as sources contemporary to the Games indicate that he was in England too soon after the tournament to have been in Paris. The Daily Telegraph, dated Saturday, August 11, 1900 reported that Derbyshire did not make the trip and was replaced by Thomas Coe, who like Derbyshire, was a member of the Osborne Swimming Club.

In 1921, Derbyshire was a founding member of the Penguin Swimming Club, later becoming the Hammersmith Penguin Swimming Club through their merger with the Hammersmith Ladies Swimming Club (which was founded by his wife Alice five years before in 1916).

== Legacy ==
In 1950, Alice Derbyshire gave a shield to the club she had co-founded in memory of her husband. It was later named the Rob Derbyshire Memorial Trophy and is awarded yearly to the person who has done best for the club.

In 1976, the club he and Alice Derbyshire had created was renamed the West London Penguin Swimming and Water Polo Club.

In 2005, he was posthumously inducted into the International Swimming Hall of Fame.

== See also ==
- List of members of the International Swimming Hall of Fame
- List of Olympic medalists in swimming (men)
- World record progression 4 × 200 metres freestyle relay
