= Taylor Girlz =

American rap-dance trio

- Genres: Rap; Dance; R&B
- Years active: 2013–present
- Label: RCA Records
- Members: Daysha Taylor; Ti Taylor; Tiny

Taylor Girlz are an American rap-dance-R&B musical trio consisting of sister rappers Daysha Taylor (born December 25, 1995) and Ti Taylor (born August 7, 1998 in Alabama), and dancer-choreographer Tiny. Raised in Atlanta, the Taylor sisters were inspired by their father's rapping to develop their own rhymes. They began working with Tiny in 2013. Now a full-fledged girl group, they first gained popularity in 2015 with their "Woozie" dance video.

In 2016 they released two singles produced by Bolo Da Producer (Silentó of "Watch Me (Whip/Nae Nae)" fame), "Steal Her Man" and "Wedgie," both featuring third Taylor sister Trinity. Both became hugely popular viral dance challenges, bringing the trio to prominence and a record deal with RCA Records.

The "Steal Her Man" challenge video received over 33 million YouTube views, the "Wedgie" video over 13 million. "Steal Her Man" hit No. 1 on Billboard's Bubbling Under R&B/Hip-Hop Chart, and the group appeared on Pandora Radio's Trendsetters Chart in November 2016. As of this writing the two dance singles have received a combined 40 million streams on Spotify, Apple Music and Vevo.

In February 2017 RCA released the group's EP Who Are Those Girlz!?.
