= Lime Lake (Murray County, Minnesota) =

Lake in the state of Minnesota, United States

- Location within Minnesota
- Location: Murray County, Minnesota
- Coordinates: 43°57′0″N 95°39′48″W
- Type: lake

Lime Lake is a lake in Murray County, in the U.S. state of Minnesota.

Lime Lake was named for the natural limestone in and around the lake.

== See also ==
- List of lakes in Minnesota
