= Diving at the 1924 Summer Olympics – Men's 10 metre platform =

Men's 10 metre platform at the Games of the VIII Olympiad
- Venue: Piscine des Tourelles
- Dates: 19 July (semifinals); 20 July (final)
- Competitors: 20 from 10 nations

Medalists
1st place, gold medalist(s)		Albert White	United States
2nd place, silver medalist(s)		David Fall	United States
3rd place, bronze medalist(s)		Clarence Pinkston	United States

The men's 10 metre platform, also reported as plongeons de haut vol variés (English: varied high diving), was one of five diving events on the diving at the 1924 Summer Olympics programme. The competition was actually held from both 10 metre and 5 metre platforms. Divers performed four compulsory dives - standing inward plain dive, standing backward dive with twist, running forward somersault dive and running reverse somersault dive (5 metre platform) - and four dives of the competitor's choice for a total of eight dives. The competition was held on Saturday, 19 July 1924, and Sunday, 20 July 1924. Twenty divers from ten nations competed.

== Results ==
=== First round ===
The three divers who scored the smallest number of points in each group of the first round advanced to the final.

==== Group 1 ====
Rank	Diver	Nation	Points	Score	Notes
1	Clarence Pinkston	United States	6	507.5	Q
2	Erik Adlerz	Sweden	11	475.2	Q
3	Eugène Lenormand	France	13	435.6	Q
4	Luigi Cangiullo	Italy	20	398.8	
5	Eric MacDonald	Great Britain	25	345.5	
6	Henk Lotgering	Netherlands	30	303.0	
7	Santiago Ulio	Spain	35	204.8	

==== Group 2 ====
Rank	Diver	Nation	Points	Score	Notes
1	Albert White	United States	5	491.8	Q
2	Helge Öberg	Sweden	10	435.4	Q
3	Hannes Kärkkäinen	Finland	16	408.2	Q
4	Albert Knight	Great Britain	19	394.5	
5	Gustave Van Heymbeeck	Belgium	27	354.3	
6	Étienne Vincent	France	28	354.0	

==== Group 3 ====
Rank	Diver	Nation	Points	Score	Notes
1	David Fall	United States	6	472.9	Q
2	Adolf Hellquist	Sweden	9	442.8	Q
3	Sven Palle Sørensen	Denmark	16	400.0	Q
4	André Cochinal	France	21	374.2	
5	Lauri Kyöstilä	Finland	23	363.4	
6	Henk Hemsing	Netherlands	30	306.0	
7	Antonio de Tort	Spain	35	229.4	

=== Final ===
Rank	Diver	Nation	Points	Score
1st place, gold medalist(s)	Albert White	United States	9	487.3
2nd place, silver medalist(s)	David Fall	United States	11.5	486.5
3rd place, bronze medalist(s)	Clarence Pinkston	United States	16.5	473.0
4	Erik Adlerz	Sweden	19	468.9
5	Eugène Lenormand	France	24	437.7
6	Helge Öberg	Sweden	31	429.0
7	Sven Palle Sørensen	Denmark	36	404.6
8	Adolf Hellquist	Sweden	37.5	403.2
9	Hannes Kärkkäinen	Finland	40.5	380.9

== Sources ==
- Comité Olympique Français (1924). "Les Jeux de la VIIIe Olympiade - Rapport Officiel" (PDF). pp. p. 462. Archived from the original (pdf) on 10 April 2008.
- Herman de Wael (3 August 2003). "Diving 1924". Archived from the original on 11 June 2007.
