= Diving at the 1924 Summer Olympics – Men's plain high diving =

Men's plain high diving at the Games of the VIII Olympiad
- Venue: Piscine des Tourelles
- Dates: 14 July (semifinals); 15 July (final)
- Competitors: 25 from 10 nations

Medalists
1st place, gold medalist(s)		Dick Eve	Australia
2nd place, silver medalist(s)		John Jansson	Sweden
3rd place, bronze medalist(s)		Harold Clarke	Great Britain

The men's plain high diving, also reported as plongeons de haut vol ordinaires (English: regular high diving), was one of five diving events on the diving at the 1924 Summer Olympics programme. The competition was actually held from both 10 metre and 5 metre platforms. The competitors performed four times a forward plain dive: two from the 10 metre and two from the 5 metre platforms. The competition was held on Monday 14 July 1924, and Tuesday 15 July 1924. Twenty-five divers from ten nations competed.

== Results ==
=== First round ===
The three divers who scored the smallest number of points in each group of the first round advanced to the final.

==== Group 1 ====
Rank	Diver	Nation	Points	Score	Notes
1	Dick Eve	Australia	13.5	157	Q
2	Pete Desjardins	United States	13.5	155	Q
3	Raymond Vincent	France	17	155	Q
4	Erik Adlerz	Sweden	17.5	151	
5	Yrjö Valkama	Finland	19.5	150	
6	Albert Dickin	Great Britain	25.5	141	
7	Sven Palle Sørensen	Denmark	38	125	
8	Gustave Van Heymbeeck	Belgium	41	118	
9	Francisco Ortíz	Spain	41.5	117	

==== Group 2 ====
Rank	Diver	Nation	Points	Score	Notes
1	Arvid Wallman	Sweden	8.5	165	Q
2	Clarence Pinkston	United States	10	157	Q
3	Albert Knight	Great Britain	12	156	Q
4	Volmer Otzen	Denmark	22	137	
5	Georges Garreau	France	27	127	
6	Hugo Koivuniemi	Finland	28	123	
7	Henk Lotgering	Netherlands	32.5	116	
8	Antonio Tort	Spain	40	90	

==== Group 3 ====
Rank	Diver	Nation	Points	Score	Notes
1	Harold Clarke	Great Britain	9	162	Q
2	Ben Thrash	United States	17	146	Q
3	John Jansson	Sweden	17	144	Q
4	Émile Dauvet	France	19.5	147	
5	Herold Jansson	Denmark	21	141	
6	Jussi Elo	Finland	21.5	141	
7	Santiago Ulio	Spain	36	102	
8	Henk Hemsing	Netherlands	39	94	

=== Final ===
Rank	Diver	Nation	Points	Score
1st place, gold medalist(s)	Dick Eve	Australia	13.5	160
2nd place, silver medalist(s)	John Jansson	Sweden	14.5	157
3rd place, bronze medalist(s)	Harold Clarke	Great Britain	15.5	158
4	Ben Thrash	United States	23.5	145
5	Raymond Vincent	France	26.5	144
6	Pete Desjardins	United States	28	141
7	Albert Knight	Great Britain	31	137
8	Arvid Wallman	Sweden	31.5	136
9	Clarence Pinkston	United States	41	125

== Sources ==
- Comité Olympique Français (1924). "Les Jeux de la VIIIe Olympiade - Rapport Officiel" (PDF). pp. p. 456. Archived from the original (pdf) on 10 April 2008.
- Herman de Wael (3 August 2003). "Diving 1924". Archived from the original on 11 June 2007.
