= Deaths in July 1998 =

The following is a list of notable deaths in July 1998.

Entries for each day are listed alphabetically by surname. A typical entry lists information in the following sequence:

- Name, age, country of citizenship at birth, subsequent country of citizenship (if applicable), reason for notability, cause of death (if known), and reference.

== July 1998 ==
=== 1 ===
- Francis Ambrière, 90, French author.
- Margarita Azurdia, 67, Guatemalan sculptor, painter, poet, and performance artist.
- Jane Bell, 88, Canadian track and field athlete and Olympic champion (1928).
- Dumitru Berciu, 91, Romanian historian and archaeologist.
- Ed Connolly, 58, American baseball player (Boston Red Sox, Cleveland Indians).
- Stig Järrel, 88, Swedish actor, film director and revue artist.
- Claire Kelly, 64, American actress and model.
- Dimitris Liantinis, 55, Greek philosopher, writer and university professor, suicide.
- Martin Seymour-Smith, 70, British poet, literary critic, and biographer.
- Rodney Smith, Baron Smith, 84, British surgeon.
- Toyonobori, 67, Japanese sumo wrestler, heart failure.

=== 2 ===
- Leon Brinkopf, 71, American baseball player (Chicago Cubs).
- Shen Chang-huan, 84, Taiwanese politician and diplomat.
- Tony De Vit, 40, English DJ and music producer, bronchial failure.
- Carl M. Freeman, 87, American real estate developer and manager, traffic collision.
- Joe Graboski, 68, American basketball player.
- Miklós Gábor, 79, Hungarian actor.
- Brian Johnston, 64, New Zealand Olympic field hockey player (1956).
- Valter Külvet, 34, Estonian athlete and Olympian (1988), beaten.
- Juan José Nogués, 89, Spanish football player and manager.
- Errol Parker, 72, French-Algerian jazz pianist, liver cancer.
- Reg Potter, 83, British Olympic water polo player (1948).
- Sohrab Shahid-Saless, 54, Iranian film director and screenwriter, liver failure.
- Kay Thompson, 88, American author, actress and singer.

=== 3 ===
- Arun Kumar Ahuja, 81, Indian film actor and producer.
- Enzo Bartolini, 84, Italian rower and Olympian (1936).
- Danielle Bunten Berry, 49, American game designer and programmer, lung cancer.
- Alf Boyd, 77, Scottish football player.
- Sadeq Chubak, 81, Iranian author of short fiction, drama, and novels.
- Al Couppee, 78, American gridiron football player (Washington Redskins).
- Louis L. Goldstein, 85, American politician.
- Peter C. Hains III, 97, American army officer and Olympic modern pentathlete (1928).
- Billie Hughes, 50, American songwriter, musician and record producer, heart attack.
- Bernhard Häring, 85, German Catholic theologian, and priest.
- Carl Koch, 86, American architect.
- George Lloyd, 85, British composer.
- Rhoda Martin, 78, Canadian Olympic fencer (1948).
- Elizabeth Riddell, 88, Australian poet and journalist.
- Lev Rokhlin, 51, Soviet / Russian army officer, shot.
- Kazimierz Sokołowski, 90, Polish ice hockey player and Olympian (1932, 1936).
- Duncan White, 80, Sri Lankan track and field athlete and Olympic medalist (1948).

=== 4 ===
- Gladys Ambrose, 67, English actress, cancer.
- Gregg Burge, 40, American tap dancer and choreographer, brain tumor.
- Kurt Franz, 84, German SS officer and commander of the Treblinka extermination camp.
- Denis Ségui Kragbé, 60, Ivorian Olympic shot putter and discus thrower (1964, 1968).
- Peter Monteverdi, 64, Swiss carmaker, cancer.
- Lee Moody, 81, American baseball player.
- Lin Newborn, 24, American anti-racist skinhead.
- M. N. Sathyaardhi, 85, Indian writer and freedom fighter.
- Jay Taylor, 30, American basketball player (New Jersey Nets), burned.
- Aurelio Chu Yi, 69, Panamanian Olympic judoka (1964).

=== 5 ===
- Frank Creagh, 74, New Zealand boxer.
- Cleeve Horne, 86, Canadian portrait painter and sculptor, respiratory-related illness.
- Sid Luckman, 81, American football player (Chicago Bears) and member of the Pro Football Hall of Fame.
- Maria Mercè Marçal, 45, Catalan poet, professor, writer and translator from Spain, breast cancer.
- Frank Righeimer, 89, American fencer and Olympic medalist (1932, 1936).
- Johnny Speight, 78, English television scriptwriter, pancreatic cancer.
- Stevie Hyper D, 31, British drum and bass MC, heart attack.

=== 6 ===
- Semon Knudsen, 85, American automobile executive.
- Georges Maton, 84, French Olympic cyclist (1936).
- Alan Revill, 75, English cricketer.
- Roy Rogers, 86, American singer and actor (The Roy Rogers Show), congestive heart failure.
- Ed Sanicki, 74, American baseball player (Philadelphia Phillies).

=== 7 ===
- Moshood Kashimawo Olawale Abiola, 60, Nigerian businessman, politician and aristocrat, homicide.
- M. Athar Ali, 73, Indian historian, liver cancer.
- F. Tillman Durdin, 91, American foreign correspondent for The New York Times.
- Lenore Romney, 89, American actress and political figure, stroke.

=== 8 ===
- Lilí Álvarez, 93, Spanish sportswoman, author, journalist, and Olympian (1924).
- Constance Cox, 85, British script writer and playwright.
- Kohei Murakoso, 92, Japanese runner and Olympian (1936), respiratory disease.
- Dušan Vukotić, 71, Yugoslav and Croatian cartoonist and author, heart attack.
- Philip Charles Wilkins, 85, American district judge (United States District Court for the Eastern District of California).

=== 9 ===
- Knut Bergsland, 84, Norwegian linguist.
- Jim Flora, 84, American artist, stomach cancer.
- David Fulker, 61, British behavioural geneticist.
- Lester King, 59, Jamaican cricket player.
- Jadwiga Klimaj, 66, Polish Olympic shot putter (1960).
- Katherine Russell, 89, English social worker and university teacher.
- Halvor J. Sandsdalen, 87, Norwegian farmer, journalist, poet, playwright and children's writer.
- Aldo Stellita, 50, Italian bassist and songwriter, lung cancer.

=== 10 ===
- Lonnie Eggleston, 80, American basketball player (St. Louis Bombers).
- Willie Fry, 43, American football player (Pittsburgh Steelers), heart attack.
- Ray Neil, 77, American baseball player.
- Billy Patterson, 79, American football player (Chicago Cardinals, Pittsburgh Steelers).
- Elijah Pitts, 60, American football player (Green Bay Packers, Los Angeles Rams, New Orleans Saints), stomach cancer.
- William Preston, 76, American actor.
- Victor Smith, 85, Royal Australian Navy officer.

=== 11 ===
- Octav Botnar, 84, Romanian-British businessman and founder of Datsun, stomach cancer.
- John Boyd-Carpenter, Baron Boyd-Carpenter, 90, British politician.
- Komla Agbeli Gbedemah, 85, Ghanaian politician.
- Emma Humphreys, 30, British convict, accidental overdose.
- Panagiotis Kondylis, 54, Greek philosopher, intellectual and historian.
- Guy Lafitte, 71, French jazz saxophonist.
- John J. Tominac, 76, United States Army officer and recipient of the Medal of Honor.

=== 12 ===
- M. M. S. Ahuja, 69, Indian endocrinologist.
- Wilson Francisco Alves, 70, Brazilian football player and manager.
- Jimmy Driftwood, 91, American folk music songwriter and musician, heart attack.
- Bo Giertz, 92, Swedish theologian, novelist and bishop.
- Arkady Ostashev, 72, Russian mechanical engineer.
- Maithripala Senanayake, 82, Sri Lankan politician.

=== 13 ===
- Watkins Moorman Abbitt, 90, American politician and lawyer, leukemia.
- Gauri Ayyub, 67, Indian social worker, activist and writer, acute arthritis.
- Red Badgro, 95, American football player (New York Yankees, New York Giants, Brooklyn Dodgers), football coach and member of the Pro Football Hall of Fame, fall.
- Keith Beebe, 77, American baseball player (New York Giants).
- Stanley Bergerman, 94, American producer of horror films, cancer.
- John Béchervaise, 88, Australian writer, photographer, artist, historian and explorer.
- Konstantinos Kollias, 97, Prime Minister of Greece during the military junta.
- Jean René Célestin Parédès, 83, French film actor, heart attack.
- Ben Zion Abba Shaul, 73, Israeli Sephardic rabbi.
- Sigismund von Braun, 87, German diplomat and politician.

=== 14 ===
- Rex Applegate, 84, American army officer.
- Haim Ben-Asher, 94, Israeli politician.
- Beryl Bryden, 78, English jazz singer.
- Glenn E. Duncan, 80, United States Air Force officer and World War II flying ace.
- Miroslav Holub, 74, Czech poet and immunologist.
- Herman David Koppel, 89, Danish composer and pianist.
- Richard McDonald, 89, American entrepreneur, co-founder of McDonald's and inventor of the fast food system.
- Nguyen Ngoc Loan, 67, South Vietnamese general, cancer.
- Robert Augustine Ward Lowndes, 81, American science fiction author and editor.
- Karl Schirdewan, 91, German communist activist and East German politician.
- Angus John Mackintosh Stewart, 61, British writer.
- Thomas Martin Thompson, 43, American convicted murderer, execution by lethal injection.

=== 15 ===
- Malcolm Booker, 82, Australian diplomat, author and journalist.
- Fred Hergert, 85, Canadian ice hockey player (New York Americans).
- Henry J. Leir, 98, American industrialist, financier, and philanthropist.
- Kazimierz Lis, 88, Polish football player.
- Joseph Desmond O'Connor, 78, British linguist, pneumonia.
- S. Shanmuganathan, 38, Sri Lankan Tamil militant and politician, assassinated.

=== 16 ===
- John Ball, 73, English footballer.
- Gisella Caccialanza, 83, American prima ballerina, stroke.
- John Henrik Clarke, 83, African-American historian and professor, heart attack.
- Léopold Corriveau, 72, Canadian politician, member of the House of Commons of Canada (1970-1984).
- Philip J. Corso, 83, American Army officer, heart attack.
- Jess Dobernic, 80, American baseball player (Chicago White Sox, Chicago Cubs, Cincinnati Reds).
- Mahbub ul Haq, 64, Pakistani economist and politician.
- Lucien Lamoureux, 77, Canadian politician and Speaker of the House of Commons of Canada.
- Robert Ruszkowski, 56, Polish Olympic canoeist (1964).
- Wilfred Thorpe, 81, American football player (Cleveland Rams).

=== 17 ===
- Robert Cornog, 86, American physicist and engineer.
- Lamberto Gardelli, 82, Italian-born Swedish conductor.
- Gladstone Guest, 81, English football player.
- Lillian Hoban, 73, American illustrator and children's writer.
- Marc Hunter, 44, New Zealand singer, songwriter and record producer, cancer.
- Karl-Heinz Höcker, 82, German theoretical nuclear physicist.
- Paul H. Kocher, 91, American academic and writer.
- James Lighthill, 74, British mathematician.
- Joseph Maher, 64, Irish-American actor, playwright and director, brain tumor, brain cancer.
- Hervé Mirouze, 73, French football player and coach.
- Hugh Reilly, 82, American actor, emphysema.
- Claudia Testoni, 82, Italian Olympic hurdler, sprinter and long jumper (1936).
- Adam Wright, 22-23, Australian rugby league footballer.

=== 18 ===
- Emilio Alfaro, 65, Argentine actor, and theatre and film director.
- Solon Barnett, 77, American football player (Green Bay Packers).
- Florence Bird, 90, Canadian broadcaster, journalist, and senator.
- Hans Feibusch, 99, German painter and sculptor.
- Mykola Lebed, 89, Ukrainian political activist, nationalist and guerrilla fighter.
- Betty Marsden, 79, English comedy actress.
- Svein Bjørn Olsen, 53, Norwegian footballer.
- Balangoda Ananda Maitreya Thero, 101, Sri Lankan Buddhist monk.

=== 19 ===
- Frank Altimari, 69, American judge.
- Giliana Berneri, French communist activist.
- Rune Nilsen, 74, Norwegian triple jumper and Olympian (1952).
- Antoine Tisné, 65, French composer.
- Ralph Toohy, 71, Canadian Football League player.
- Elmer Valo, 77, Slovak American baseball player and coach.

=== 20 ===
- Norah Borges, 97, Argentine artist.
- June Byers, 76, American women's professional wrestler, pneumonia.
- Alberto Cavallari, 70, Italian journalist and writer.
- Tossy Spivakovsky, 91, Russian-American violin virtuoso.

=== 21 ===
- Hans van Kesteren, 90, Dutch footballer.
- Doug Miller, 28, American gridiron football player (San Diego Chargers), lightning strike.
- Alan Shepard, 74, American astronaut (Mercury-Redstone 3, Apollo 14), naval aviator and test pilot, complications from leukemia.
- Kenneth Watson, 66, British television actor, pancreatic cancer.
- Robert Young, 91, American actor (Marcus Welby, M.D., Father Knows Best, Window on Main Street), Emmy winner (1957, 1958, 1970), respiratory failure.

=== 22 ===
- Eugene Aserinsky, 77, American sleep researcher, traffic collision.
- Fritz Buchloh, 88, German football manager, player, and Olympian (1936).
- Michael Denison, 82, English actor.
- Don Dunphy, 90, American television and radio sports announcer.
- Judy Malcolm, 87, American film actress.
- Corbett Monica, 68, American comedian, cancer.
- Hermann Prey, 69, German bass-baritone, heart attack.
- Antonio Saura, 67, Spanish artist and writer.
- Laszlo Szapáry, 88, Austrian Olympic sports shooter (1952, 1960, 1964).
- Tjokropranolo, 74, Indonesian politician and military officer.

=== 23 ===
- Harvie Branscomb, 103, American theologian and academic.
- Vladimir Dudintsev, 79, Russian writer.
- André Gertler, 90, Hungarian classical violinist.
- Mark Hampton, 58, American designer.
- John Hopkins, 67, English film, stage and television writer, fall.
- R. Tudur Jones, 77, Welsh nationalist theologian.
- Vladimir Kärk, 83, Estonian Olympic basketball player (1936).
- John Klumb, 82, American football player (Chicago Cardinals, Pittsburgh Steelers).
- Northrup Rand Knox, 69, American banker and community leader.
- Djibril Diop Mambéty, 53, Senegalese actor, film director and poet, lung cancer.
- Matteo Manuguerra, 73, Tunisian-French baritone.
- Med Park, 65, American basketball player (St. Louis Hawks, Cincinnati Royals).
- Muzz Patrick, 83, Canadian ice hockey player and coach.
- Wilbur Schwandt, 94, American musician, songwriter.
- Manuel Mejía Vallejo, 75, Colombian writer.

=== 24 ===
- Gus Alex, 82, Greek-American mobster, heart attack.
- Alta Allen, 93, American silent film actress.
- Ronnie Grieveson, 88, South African cricketer.
- Berta Hrubá, 52, Czech field hockey player and Olympic medalist (1980).
- Henri Ziegler, 91, French aerospace engineers, aviation pioneer and first president of Airbus.

=== 25 ===
- Les Dodson, 82, American gridiron football player (Pittsburgh Steelers).
- David Durand, 77, American actor.
- Tal Farlow, 77, American jazz guitarist, esophageal cancer.
- Tiny Rowland, 80, British businessman and corporate raider, cancer.
- Étienne Vincent, 95, French Olympic diver (1924).

=== 26 ===
- Salvador Alanís, 85, Mexican athlete and Olympian (1932).
- Sava Antić, 68, Serbian football player, manager and Olympian (1956).
- Manzoor Alam Beg, 66, Bangladeshi photographer.
- Rainey Bennett, 91, American artist, illustrator and muralist.
- David J. McCloud, 53, American air force general, plane crash.
- Seán Ó hEinirí, 83, Irish seanchaí and monolingual Irish speaker.
- Zeki Kuneralp, 83, Turkish diplomat, multiple sclerosis.
- Aymoré Moreira, 86, Brazilian football player and coach.

=== 27 ===
- Binnie Barnes, 95, English actress.
- Zlatko Čajkovski, 74, Croatian football player, coach, and Olympian (1948, 1952).
- Russell M. Carneal, 80, American politician and judge.
- Elio Augusto Di Carlo, 79, Italian ornithologist, historian and physician.
- Chuck Fenenbock, 79, American football player.
- John Gilliland, 62, American radio broadcaster and documentarian.
- Gísli Halldórsson, 71, Icelandic actor.
- Elizabeth Karlin, 54, American doctor and advocate for women's reproductive rights, brain tumor.
- William McChesney Martin, 91, American businessman and Chair of the Federal Reserve.
- Muzz Patrick, 83, Canadian ice hockey player, coach, and manager (New York Rangers).
- Robin Richmond, 86, English cinema organist and BBC Radio presenter.
- Farid Shawqi, 77, Egyptian actor, screenwriter and film producer.
- Bill Tuttle, 69, American baseball player (Detroit Tigers, Kansas City Athletics, Minnesota Twins), cancer.

=== 28 ===
- Mykola Bakay, 67, Ukrainian singer, composer, poet and author.
- Wilson Teixeira Beraldo, 81, Brazilian physician and physiologist.
- Zbigniew Herbert, 73, Polish poet, essayist, drama writer and moralist.
- Adam Hollanek, 75, Polish science fiction writer and journalist.
- David Jones, 84, English cricket player.
- Olga de Blanck Martín, 82, Cuban pianist, guitarist and composer.
- Lenny McLean, 49, English boxer, bodyguard and actor, brain cancer, lung cancer.
- Consalvo Sanesi, 87, Italian racecar driver.
- Tadashi Yamamoto, 72, Japanese Olympic triple jumper (1952).

=== 29 ===
- Jorge Pacheco Areco, 78, Uruguayan politician.
- Eigil Johansen, 82, Danish Olympic wrestler (1952).
- Doris Nolan, 82, American actress.
- Jerome Robbins, 79, American choreographer, director and dancer (West Side Story), stroke.
- Fabrice Simon, 47, Haitian artist and fashion designer, AIDS.
- Oothout Zabriskie Whitehead, 87, American actor, cancer.

=== 30 ===
- Maurice Bardèche, 90, French art critic and journalist.
- Bharathan, 51, Indian film director and artist.
- Donald C. Davis, 77, United States Navy admiral, heart attack.
- Orestes Marengo, 91, Italian Roman Catholic prelate.
- Laila Schou Nilsen, 79, Norwegian sportsperson and Olympic medalist (1936, 1948).
- Stevan Pavlović, 72, Serbian long-distance runner and Olympian (1952).
- Buffalo Bob Smith, 80, American children's television host, cancer.
- Kenneth A. Walsh, 81, United States Marine Corps officer, World War II flying ace and Medal of Honor recipient, heart attack.

=== 31 ===
- Leroy Edgar Burney, 91, American physician and public health official.
- Jean de Baroncelli, 84, French writer.
- Erling Evensen, 84, Norwegian cross-country skier and Olympic medalist (1948).
- Sylvia Field, 97, American actress.
- Arvid Hanssen, 66, Norwegian journalist, newspaper editor, poet, novelist and children's writer.
- André Labeylie, 72, French cyclist.
- Ioan Ploscaru, 86, Romanian bishop of the Greek-Catholic Church.
- John E. Powers, 87, American politician.
- Richie Powers, 67, American basketball referee, stroke.
- Herbert Widmayer, 84, German football player and manager.
