= Diving at the 1924 Summer Olympics – Men's 3 metre springboard =

Men's 3 metre springboard at the Games of the VIII Olympiad
- Venue: Piscine des Tourelles
- Dates: 16 July (semifinals); 17 July (final)
- Competitors: 17 from 9 nations

Medalists
1st place, gold medalist(s)		Albert White	United States
2nd place, silver medalist(s)		Pete Desjardins	United States
3rd place, bronze medalist(s)		Clarence Pinkston	United States

The men's 3 metre springboard, also reported as plongeons du tremplin (English: trampoline diving), was one of five diving events on the diving at the 1924 Summer Olympics programme. The competition was actually held from both 3 metre and 1 metre boards. Divers performed six compulsory dives - standing backward plain dive, standing forward dive with twist, standing inward piked dive with twist, standing reverse piked dive, standing reverse plain dive with twist (3 metre board) and a standing forward somersault piked dive (1 metre board) - two jury-drawn dives and four dives of the competitor's choice for a total of twelve dives. The competition was held on Wednesday 16 July 1924, and Thursday 17 July 1924.

A point-for-place system was used. For each dive, the divers were ranked according to their dive score and awarded points based on their rank for that dive (the best dive earned 1 point, the next-best 2 points, and so on).

Seventeen divers from nine nations competed.

== Results ==
=== First round ===
The three divers who scored the smallest number of points in each group of the first round advanced to the final.

==== Group 1 ====
Place	Diver	Nation	Points	Score
1	Clarence Pinkston	United States	5	672
2	Dick Eve	Australia	13	522.3
3	Curt Sjöberg	Sweden	15	523
4	Rémy Weil	France	18	497.9
5	Henk Lotgering	Netherlands	25	459.2
6	Eric MacDonald	Great Britain	29	433.2

==== Group 2 ====
Place	Diver	Nation	Points	Score
1	Albert White	United States	5	681.9
2	Adolf Hellquist	Sweden	13	494.5
3	Henk Hemsing	Netherlands	14	455.2
4	Gregory Matveieff	Great Britain	21	414.1
5	Antoine Jacob	France	23	425.4
6	Arthur Bischoff	Switzerland	29	385

==== Group 3 ====
Place	Diver	Nation	Points	Score
1	Pete Desjardins	United States	5	662.8
2	Edmund Lindmark	Sweden	10	557
3	Julius Balasz	Czechoslovakia	16	488
4	Paul Raeth	France	19	455.5
5	Atte Lindqvist	Finland	25	398.8

=== Final ===
Place	Diver	Nation	Points	Score
1st place, gold medalist(s)	Albert White	United States	7	696.4
2nd place, silver medalist(s)	Pete Desjardins	United States	8	693.2
3rd place, bronze medalist(s)	Clarence Pinkston	United States	15	653
4	Edmund Lindmark	Sweden	22	599.1
5	Dick Eve	Australia	26	564.3
6	Adolf Hellquist	Sweden	30	544.9
7	Curt Sjöberg	Sweden	34	538.3
8	Henk Hemsing	Netherlands	39	490.8
9	Julius Balasz	Czechoslovakia	44	463.1

== Sources ==
- Comité Olympique Français (1924). "Les Jeux de la VIIIe Olympiade - Rapport Officiel" (PDF). pp. p. 466. Archived from the original (pdf) on 10 April 2008.
- Herman de Wael (3 August 2003). "Diving 1924". Archived from the original on 11 June 2007.
