= Otzen =

Otzen is a surname. Notable people with the surname include:

- Christina Otzen (born 1975), Danish sailor
- Per Marquard Otzen (born 1944) Danish Editorial Cartoonist, Politiken
- Johannes Otzen (1839–1911), German architect, urban planner, architectural theorist, and university teacher
- Robert Otzen (1872–1934), German infrastructure engineer
- Volmer Otzen, Danish diver
