= Kazimierz Sokołowski =

Kazimierz Sokołowski may refer to:

- Kazimierz Sokołowski (footballer) (born 1963), Polish football defender and manager
- Kazimierz Sokołowski (ice hockey) (1908–1998), Polish ice hockey player
