= Ulio =

Ulio is a surname. Notable people with the surname include:

- James Alexander Ulio (1882–1958), American military officer
- Santiago Ulio (1909–1981), Spanish diver
