= HaFraBa =

The Verein zur Vorbereitung der Autostraße Hansestädte–Frankfurt–Basel (English: Association for the preparation of the motorway Hanseatic cities–Frankfurt–Basel), commonly referred to as HaFraBa, was an organization dedicated to developing one of the first large Autobahn projects in Germany.

== Foundation and name ==
The association was founded on November 6, 1926 as "Verein zum Bau einer Straße für den Kraftwagen-Schnellverkehr von Hamburg über Frankfurt a.M. nach Basel" (English: Association for the building of a road for the automobile fast-moving traffic from Hamburg over Frankfurt to Basel) by Robert Otzen. On May 31, 1928 the association was renamed as the Verein zur Vorbereitung der Autostraße Hansestädte–Frankfurt–Basel to include the Hanseatic cities of Bremen and Lübeck into the planning. As the terms Hamburg and Hansestädte begin with the same letters the abbreviation HaFraBa could be maintained.

== Planned motorways and toll ==
Initial planning saw a motorway link from Hamburg to Hanover and from Frankfurt to Basel (and from Basel to Genoa) with later planning including Bremen and Lübeck. The plans almost matched the current Autobahn 5 and the Northern part of the Autobahn 7. In 1930, for each city, detailed plannings of the linkage to the Hafraba was presented in summaries subtitled "Städte an den Hafrabastraßen" (English: Cities on the roads of Hafraba) by J. F. Amberger (Heidelberg), Adolf Elsaesser (director of urban planning of Mannheim), Theodor Krebs (Darmstadt), Maurer (Mainz), Rehorn (chief of traffic of Kassel) and Carl Thalenhorst (senator of building authorities of Bremen) in the newspaper Hafraba-Mitteilungsblatt.

As the government saw no need to this project, the HaFraBa planned to implement a toll system to provide financing. The calculations resulted in the following prices:

- one car including the driver: 3 Pfennig per kilometer
- each additional person: 1 Pfennig per kilometer
- one truck: 2 Pfennig per kilometer
- loading: 0.5 Pfennig per ton and per kilometer

At first, the project was rejected by the Nazis but after the takeover by Adolf Hitler, the plans where partially adopted when building Autobahn 5 and Autobahn 7. The name of the association was later changed to Gesellschaft zur Vorbereitung der Reichsautobahnen (English: Society for the Preparation of the Autobahnen of the Third Reich).

== Literature ==
- Vahrenkamp, Richard (June 23, 2010), The German Autobahn 1920-1945: Hafraba Visions and Mega Projects (PDF) (in German), Lohmar/Köln: Josef Eul Verlag GmbH, ISBN 978-3-89936-940-3, DNB 1005500924, archived from the original (PDF) on July 28, 2011
