= Ruth Bleier =

American neurophysiologist (1923–1988)

Ruth Harriet Bleier
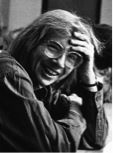
- Born: November 17, 1923; New Kensington, Pennsylvania, United States
- Died: January 4, 1988 (aged 64)
- Education: Goucher College; Woman's Medical College of Pennsylvania
- Occupations: Neurophysiologist; Activist; Feminist
- Children: 2

Ruth Harriet Bleier (November 17, 1923 – January 4, 1988) was an American neurophysiologist who is also one of the first feminist scholars to explore how gender biases have shaped biology. Her career consisted of combining her academic interests with her commitment to social justice for women and the lower class.

== Early life and education ==
Bleier was born in New Kensington, Pennsylvania, on November 17, 1923. She was also the daughter of Russian or East European 1905 immigrants and was raised in New Kensington, Pennsylvania with her four brothers. She received her B.A. from Goucher College in 1945, and subsequently received her M.D. from Woman's Medical College of Pennsylvania in 1949. She married Leon Eisenberg, and together they raised 2 children and ran a medical clinic for the impoverished population of Baltimore.

== Career ==
=== Medicine and scholarship ===
Following medical school, Bleier interned at the Sinai Hospital in Baltimore, Maryland and then practiced general medicine in the inner city of Baltimore for ten years. Due to her lack of cooperation when subpoenaed by the House Un-American Activities Committee (HUAAC), she was placed on the HUAAC blacklist resulting in Bleier losing her hospital privileges. Bleier gave up her medical practice in order to teach psychiatry and physiology at the Adolph Meyer Laboratory of Neuroanatomy. Since she lost her legal ability to practice medicine, Bleier went to Johns Hopkins University School of Medicine in 1957 to study neuroanatomy with Professor Jerzy Rose, completing her post-doctoral fellowship in 1961. She then joined the University of Wisconsin-Madison department of Neurophysiology in 1967; at the same time Bleier was also working with Weisman Center of Mental Retardation and the Wisconsin Regional Primate Center. As a result of her neuroanatomy work, Bleier is a known authority on the animal hypothalamus.

In the 1970s, Bleier began to see how the biological sciences were affected by sexism and other cultural biases, and thus devoted herself to the application of feminist analyses and viewpoint to the practices and theories of science. Bleier helped establish the Woman's Studies Program at the University of Wisconsin in 1975, and served as chair from 1982 to 1986. She also began to focus on improving women's access and station in higher education. Bleier argued against the idea of sociobiology as an explanation of conventional gender roles. In her work she demonstrated how gender, sexuality, and science, are constantly changing in response to social values and ideas rather than being static and judgment-free. She published work that brought together feminist theories and natural sciences: Science and Gender: A Critique of Biology and Its Theories on Women and Feminist Approaches to Science.

=== Activism and advocacy ===
Bleier advocated for civil rights with the Maryland Committee for Peace in the early 1950s. She also advocated for the end of the Korean War; this work lead to the subpoena from HUAAC, which was run by Senator Joseph McCarthy at the time period. At the hearing, Bleier reported the Committee for Peace had no members and would not confirm that she was head of the committee.

Sticking to her activist routes, Bleier was a founding member of the Association of Faculty Women (AFW) at the University of Wisconsin-Madison. The Association challenged the administration to reassess the status and salaries of female instructors campus-wide and to rectify inequalities. The Association succeeded in equaling pay for men and women university workers and also succeeded in integrating gymnasiums by having the women faculty have a group shower in the men's locker room. Bleier was chair of the AFW when Title IX was signed in to law and was pivotal in achieving more equitable conditions for women's athletics at Wisconsin.

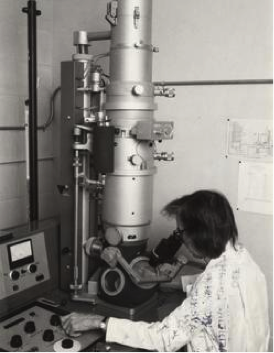
Ruth Bleier looking into her electron microscope, 1980's

== Publications ==
Bleier has published works detailing the anatomy of the cat, guinea pig, and rhesus monkey hypothalamuses. Her books regarding biology and feminism, Science and Gender: A Critique of Biology and Its Theories on Women (1984) and Feminist Approaches to Science (1986), have become prominent readings for women's studies to explore the biological differences of sexes and the origins of gender differences.

== Personal life ==
Bleier came out as a lesbian after her marriage to her husband ended in divorce and began her work to create lesbian rights within the women's movement. She created a lesbian-friendly restaurant, called “Lysistrata.” She also organized lesbian social events, a feminist bookstore. Additionally, Bleier advocated for abortion rights with her partner, Elizabeth Karlin.

== Death and legacy ==
Bleier died at home in Wisconsin on January 4, 1988, from cancer at sixty-four years old. The University of Wisconsin annually awards the Ruth Bleier scholarships in order to encourage young women to go into careers studying the natural sciences, medicine, or engineering, and the University of Wisconsin's Department of History of Medicine has an endowed chair in her honor.
