= Albert Knight =

Albert Knight may refer to:

- Albert Knight (cricketer) (1872-1946), English cricket player
- Albert Knight (politician) (1817-after 1881), merchant and political figure in Quebec
- Albert Knight (diver) (1900-1964), British diver
