= Francisco Ortíz (diver) =

Spanish diver

Francisco Ortiz
Personal information
- Full name: Francisco Ortiz Martín
- Nationality: Spanish
- Born: 27 May 1899 Alicante, Spain
- Died: 1 May 1951 (aged 51)

Sport
- Sport: Diving

Francisco Ortiz Martín (27 May 1899 – 1 May 1951) was a Spanish diver. A member of Bahía de Alicante swimming club, he competed in the men's plain high diving event at the 1924 Summer Olympics, where he finished in 28th position.
