= Ben Thrash =

American diver

Personal information
- Born: May 7, 1897 Curtis, Nebraska, United States
- Died: February 26, 1966 (aged 68) Long Beach, California, United States

Sport
- Sport: Diving

Ben Thrash (May 7, 1897 – February 26, 1966) was an American diver. He competed in the men's plain high diving event at the 1924 Summer Olympics.
