= Hugo Koivuniemi =

Finnish diver

Personal information
- Nationality: Finnish
- Born: 28 December 1894; Vyborg, Russian Empire
- Died: 25 May 1963 (aged 68); Helsinki, Finland

Sport
- Sport: Diving

Hugo Koivuniemi (28 December 1894 – 25 May 1963) was a Finnish diver. He competed in the men's plain high diving event at the 1924 Summer Olympics.
