= Georges Garreau =

French diver (1902–1986)

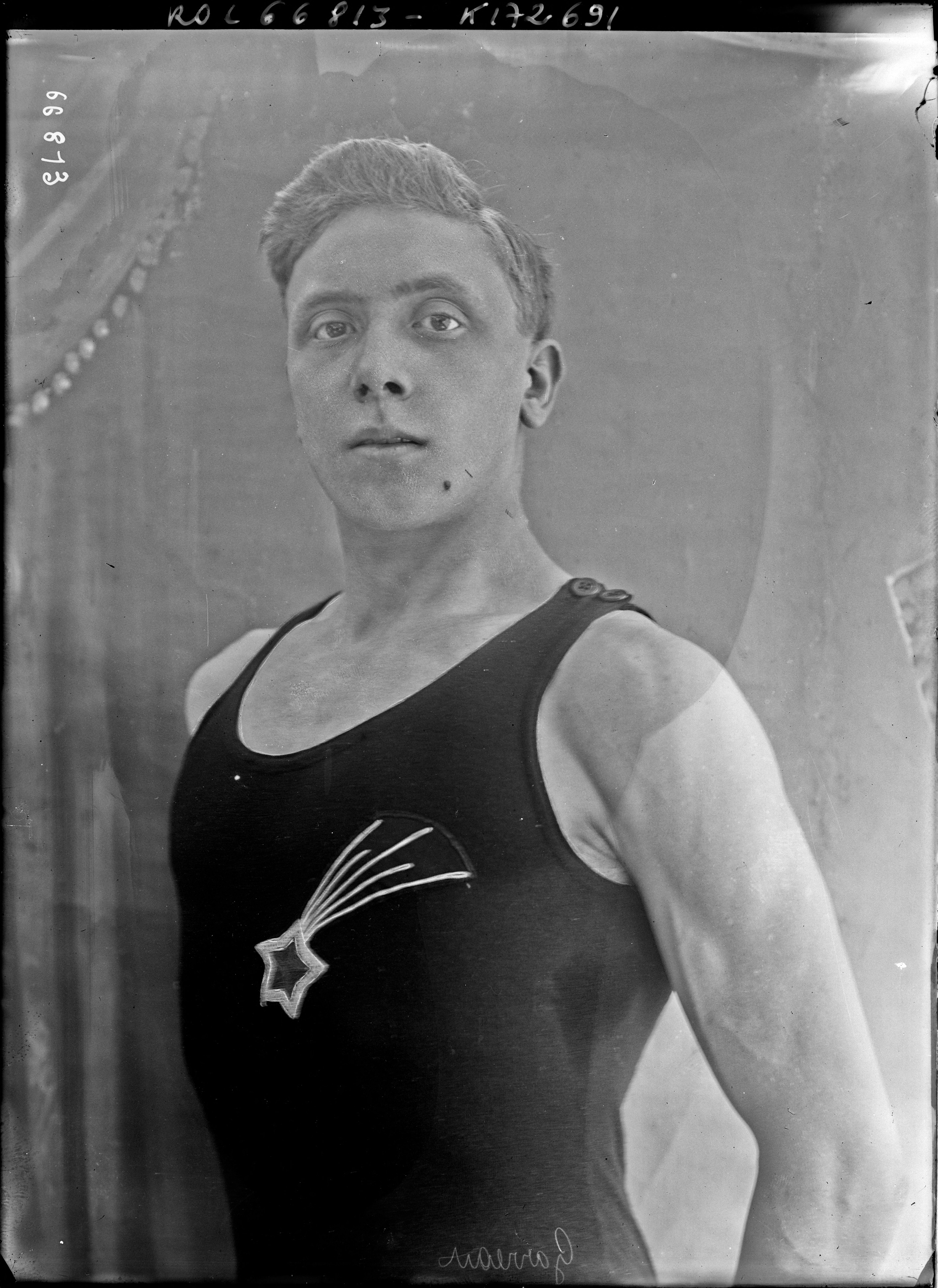

Personal information
- Nationality: French
- Born: 20 September 1902 Paris, France
- Died: 21 June 1986 (aged 83) Paris, France

Sport
- Sport: Diving

Georges Garreau (20 September 1902 – 21 June 1986) was a French diver. He competed in the men's plain high diving event at the 1924 Summer Olympics.
