= Antoine Jacob (diver) =

French diver

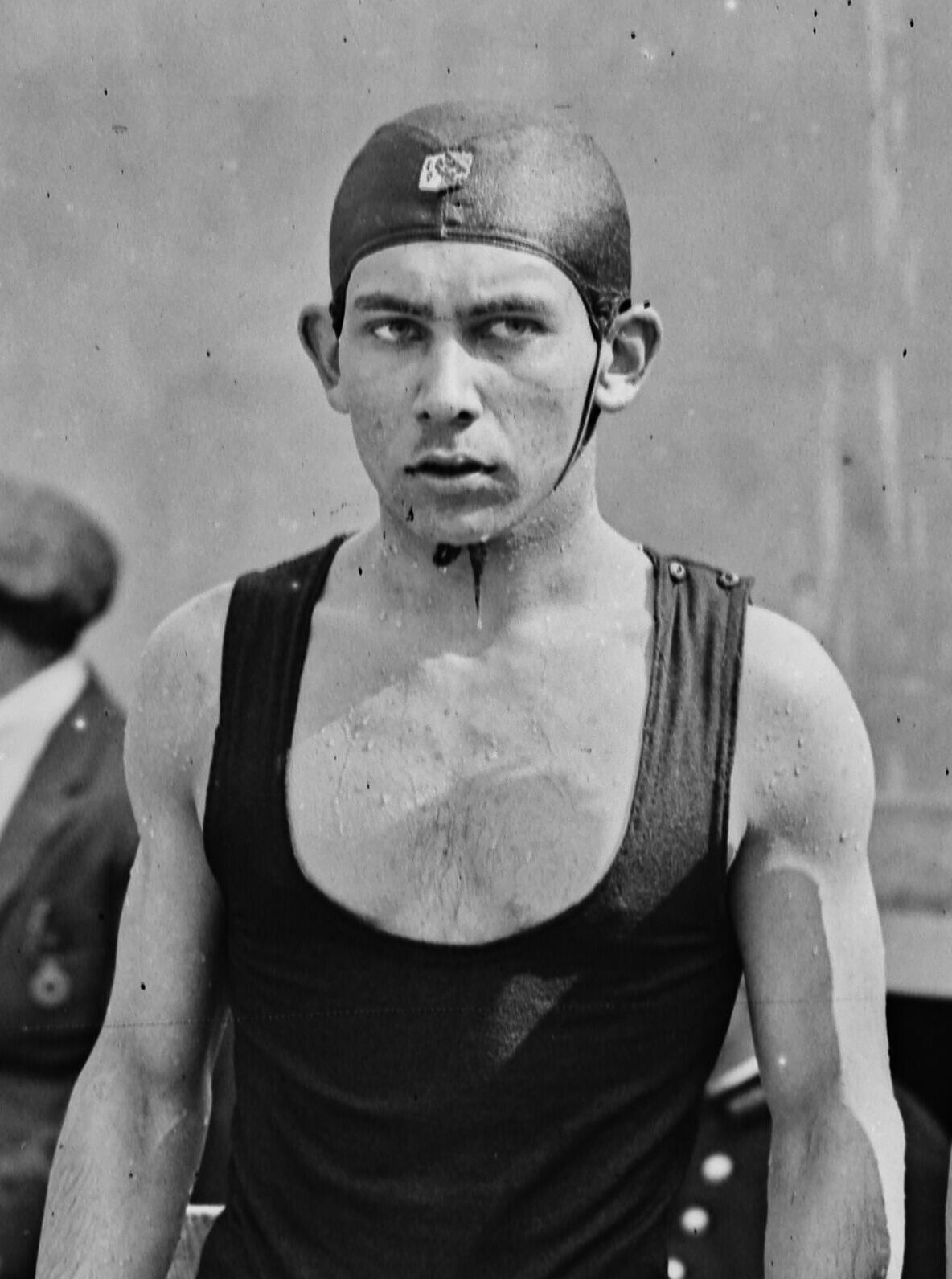
- Antoine Jacob in 1924

Personal information
- Nationality: French
- Born: 1906

Sport
- Sport: Diving

Antoine Jacob (born 1906, date of death unknown) was a French diver. He competed in the men's 3 metre springboard event at the 1924 Summer Olympics.
