= Paul Raeth =

French diver

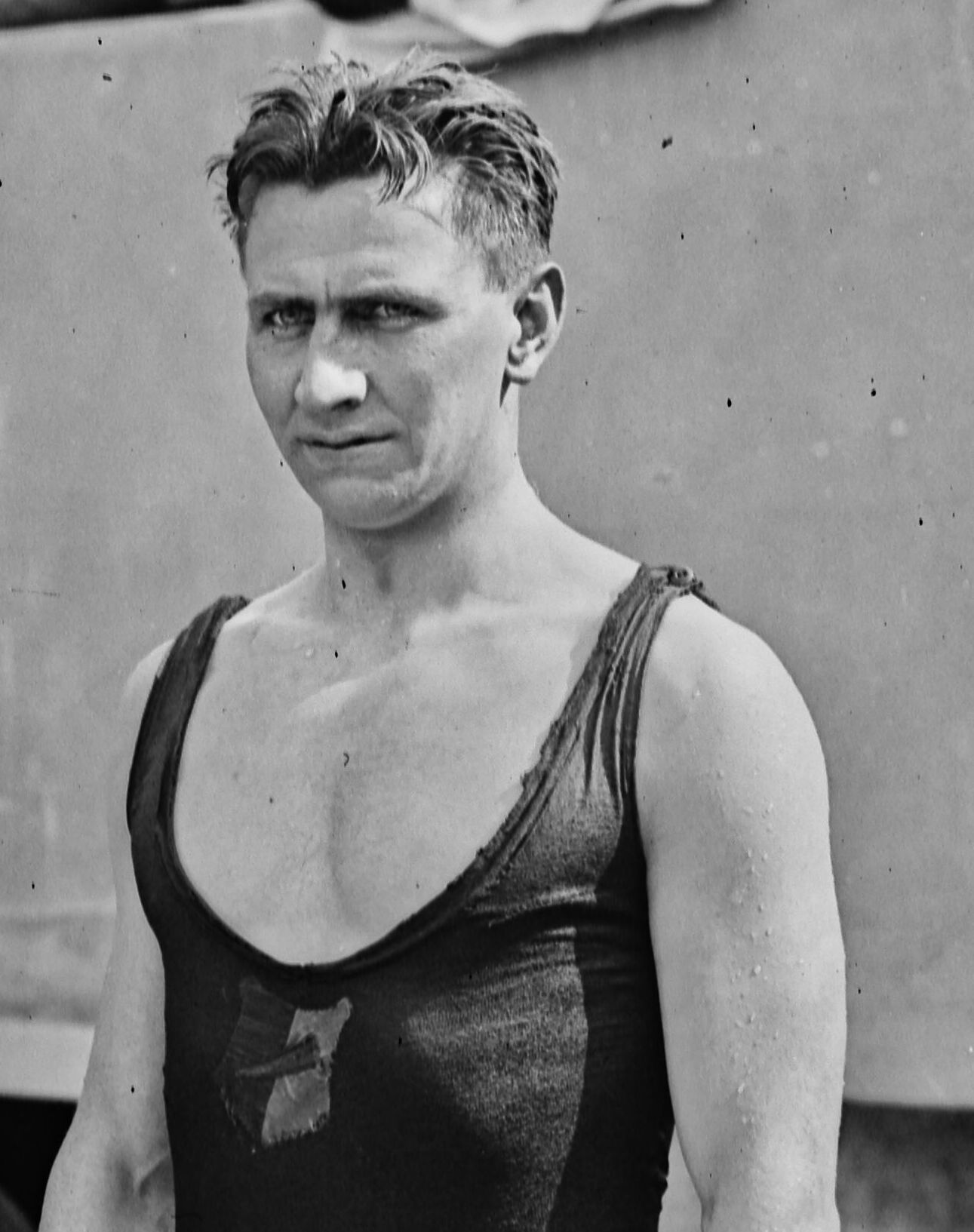
- Paul Raeth in 1924

Personal information
- Nationality: French
- Born: 20 November 1898; Colmar, France
- Died: 8 July 1989 (aged 90); Colmar, France

Sport
- Sport: Diving

Paul Raeth (20 November 1898 – 8 July 1989) was a French diver. He competed in the men's 3 metre springboard event at the 1924 Summer Olympics.
