= Émile Dauvet =

French diver

Personal information
- Nationality: French
- Born: 25 March 1907; Les Iffs, France
- Died: 31 January 1925 (aged 17); Paris, France

Sport
- Sport: Diving

Émile Dauvet (25 March 1907 – 31 January 1925) was a French diver. He competed in the men's plain high diving event at the 1924 Summer Olympics.
