= Bundesautobahn 5 =

German motorway

A 5
- Bundesautobahn 5

Route information
- Length: 445 km (277 mi)

Major junctions
- North end: A 7 at the Hattenbach triangle in Breitenbach am Herzberg, Hesse
- South end: Swiss border in Weil am Rhein, Baden-Württemberg

Location
- Country: Germany
- States: Hessen, Baden-Württemberg

Highway system
- Roads in Germany; Autobahns; List; Federal; List; State; E-roads
← A 4	→ A 6

Bundesautobahn 5 (translates from German as Federal Motorway 5, short form Autobahn 5, abbreviated as BAB 5 or A 5) is a 445 km (277 mi) long Autobahn in Germany. Its northern end is the Hattenbach triangle intersection (with the A 7). The southern end is at the Swiss border near Basel. It runs through the German states of Hessen and Baden-Württemberg and connects on its southern ending to the Swiss A 2.

The A5 passes by the Frankfurt Airport.

== History ==
=== Nazi era ===
Construction for the first section, between Frankfurt and Darmstadt was started on 23 September 1933 by Adolf Hitler. Propaganda falsely celebrated the project as "the Führer's Autobahn" and "Germany's first Autobahn," but the AVUS race track in Berlin was opened in September 1921. The first public Autobahn was the Cologne-Bonn highway which was inaugurated August 1932 (later called A 555). It was downgraded to a state highway (German: Bundesstrasse) in order to let the Nazi propaganda proclaim that the Reichsautobahn Frankfurt-Darmstadt was the first ever built in Germany.

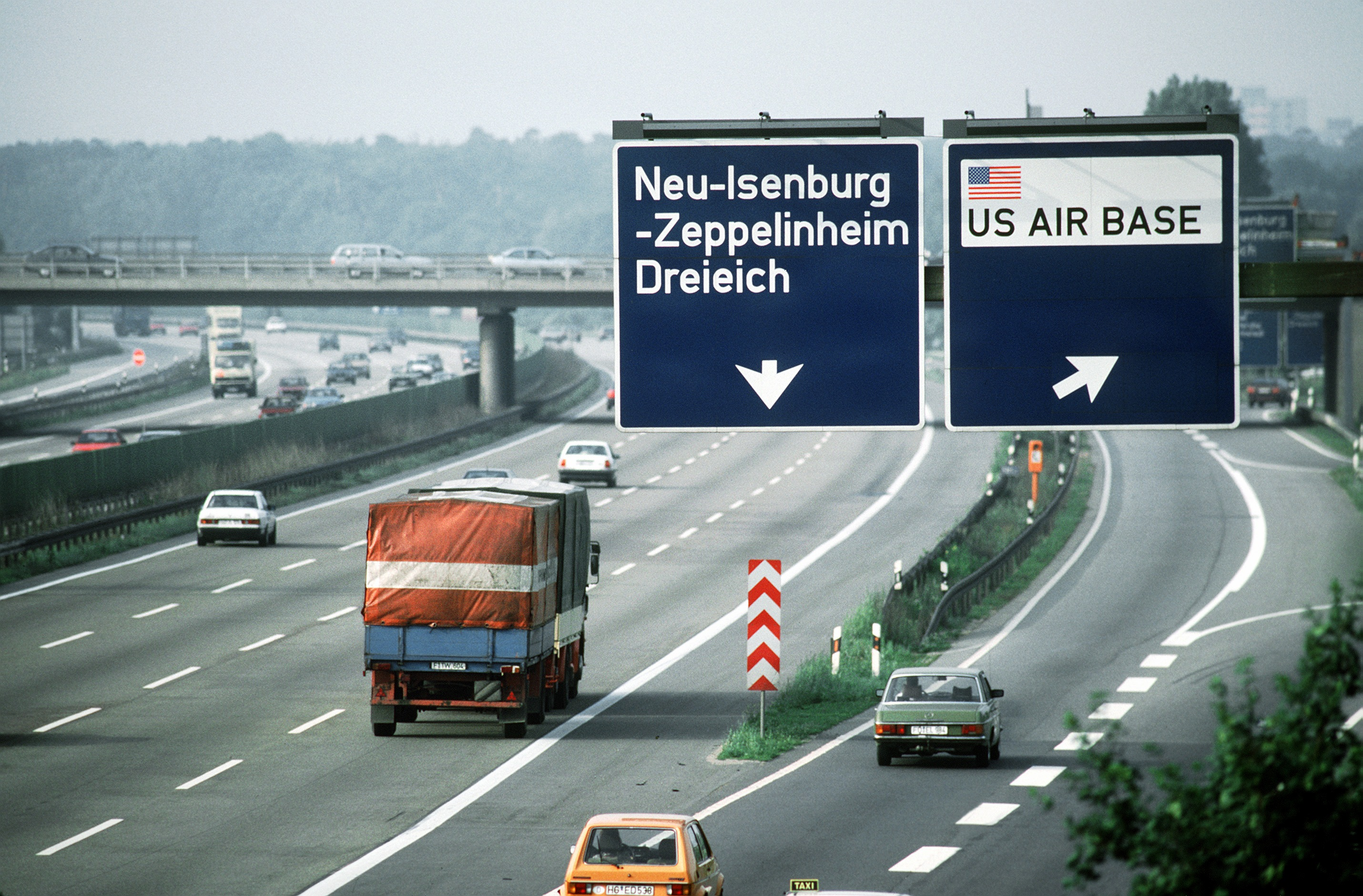
Motorway exit from the A5 to the US Rhein-Main Air Base in 1988

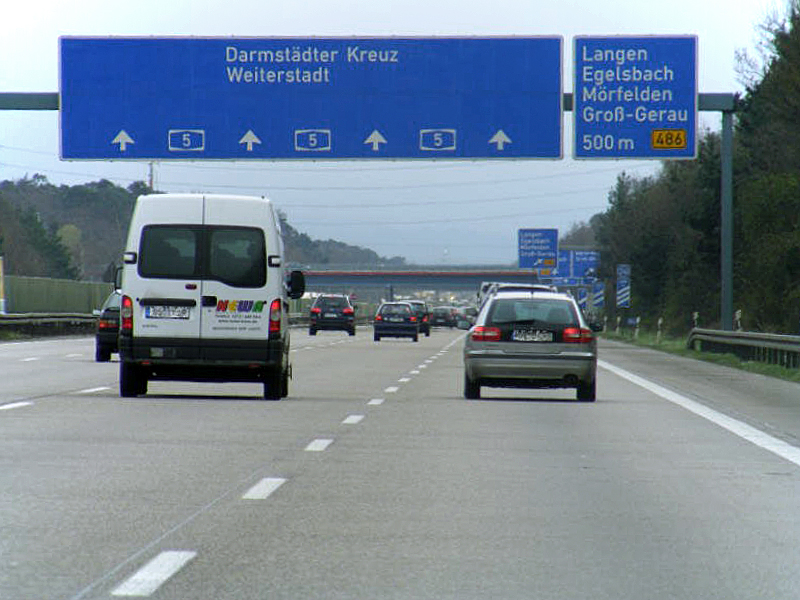
Rare sight in Europe: 4 lanes in each direction of travel for 21 kilometers. The section between Zeppelinheim and Darmstadt, it is the oldest Autobahn.

In 1926, a private association proposed a highway from Hamburg via Frankfurt to Basel (HaFraBa); these plans were stopped in the Reichstag by a coalition of Communists and Nazis. Hitler still used these plans after he came to power in 1933. Work progressed slowly, however, because Hitler favored east–west routes. The HaFraBa was renamed "Gesellschaft zur Vorbereitung der Reichsautobahnen", which translates "Company for the preparation of the Reich highways".

=== Post war ===
A 5 in 1975 (blue represents parts that were built, orange represents parts that were planned but never built)

After the war, plans to continue the A 5 to the north were abandoned for ecological reasons. Instead, an already completed section of the proposed A 48 near Gießen was used to connect the A 5 to the A 7 from Hamburg. The HaFraBa route was finally completed in 1962, which led to the A 5 southern route Darmstadt, Heidelberg, Karlsruhe, Rastatt, Baden-Baden, Freiburg, Weil am Rhein, ending at the Swiss border near Basel, at the Bundesautobahn 98 and B3. Near Frankfurt, the highway is one of the busiest in Germany with an average of 150,000 vehicles per day.

The part between Frankfurt and Darmstadt with a length of about 25 km was the first and still is Germany's longest Autobahn section with 8 lanes. The A5 runs parallel and just west of the Bundesstraße 3 for many kilometers, crossing the B3 near Rastatt. In the city of Karlsruhe, the A5 meets the A 8.

A 10 km (6.2 mi) section of A 5 south of Frankfurt were installed with overhead lines for hybrid trucks to use starting in May 2019. Siemens built the lines with Scania AB providing the trucks.

== Gallery ==
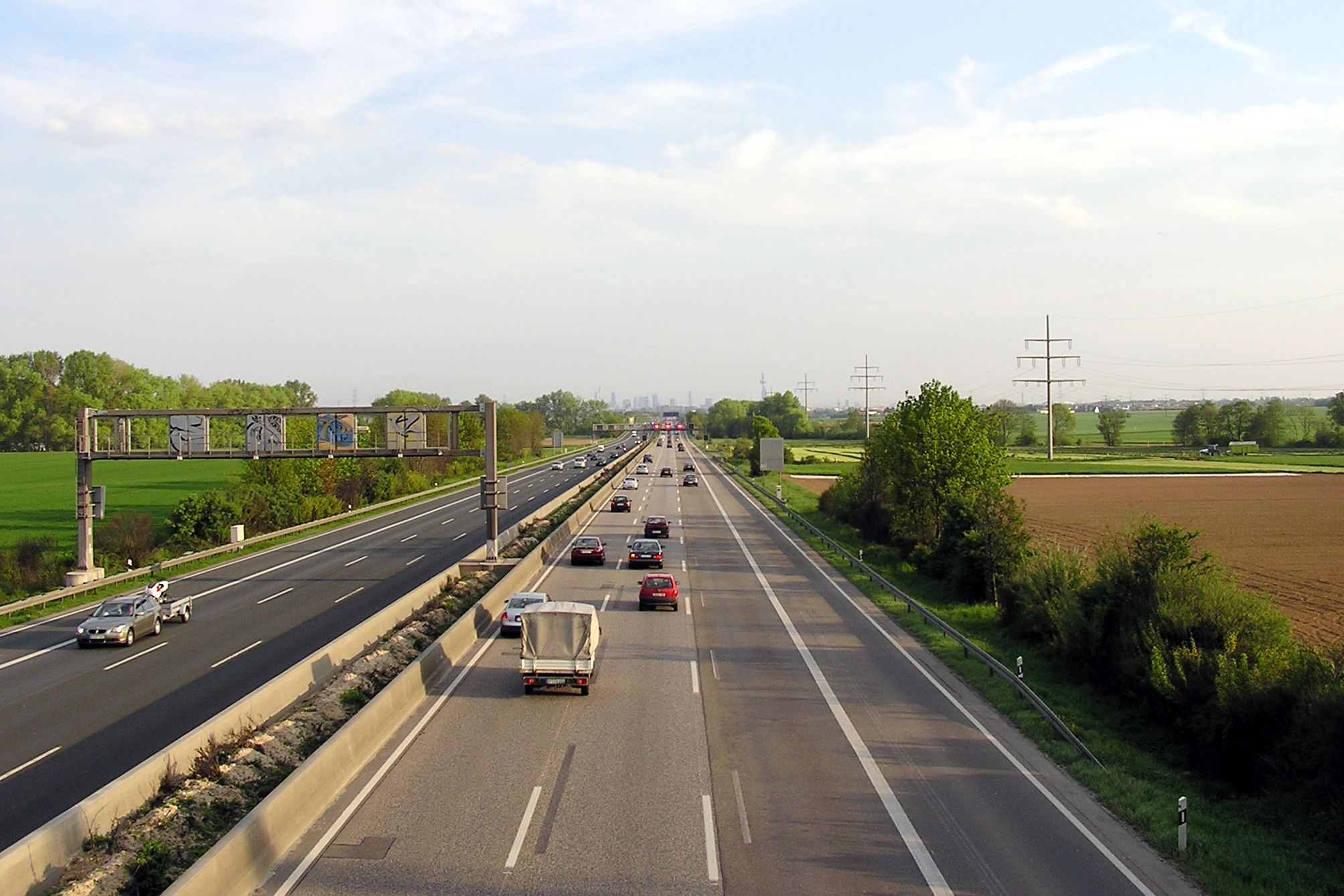
Bundesautobahn 5 at Frankfurt

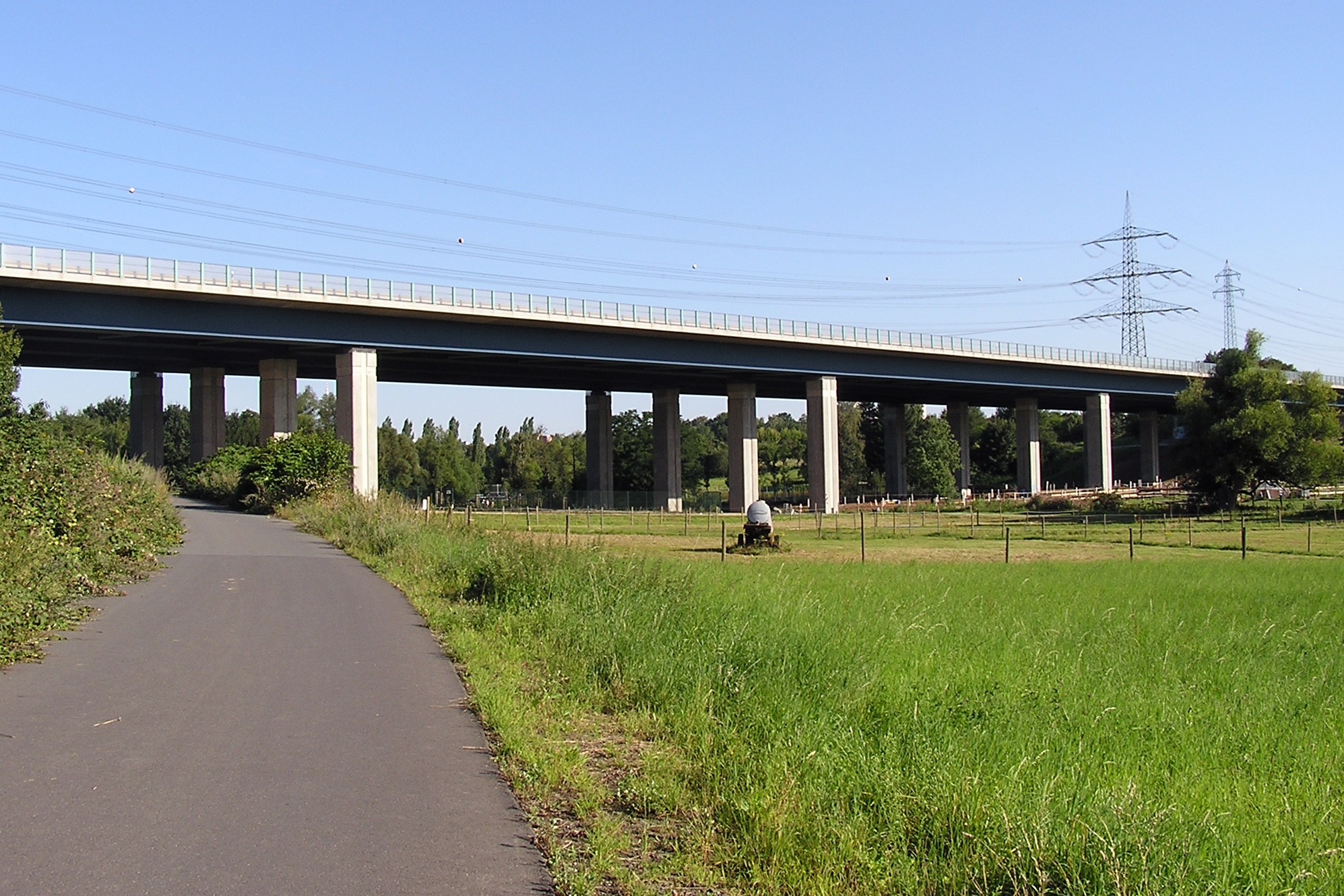
Cross "kurz" at Frankfurt

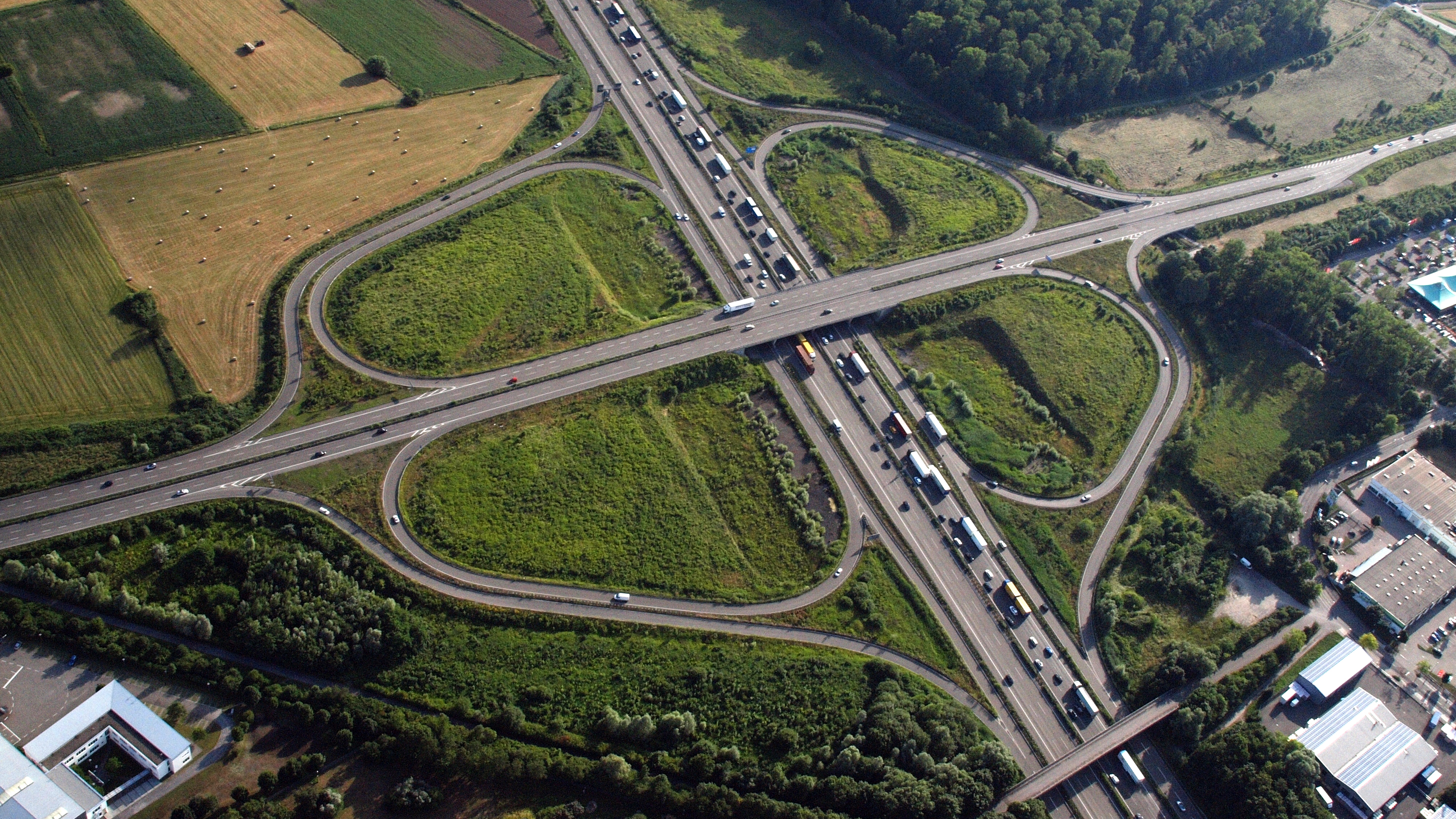
A5 at North Karlsruhe

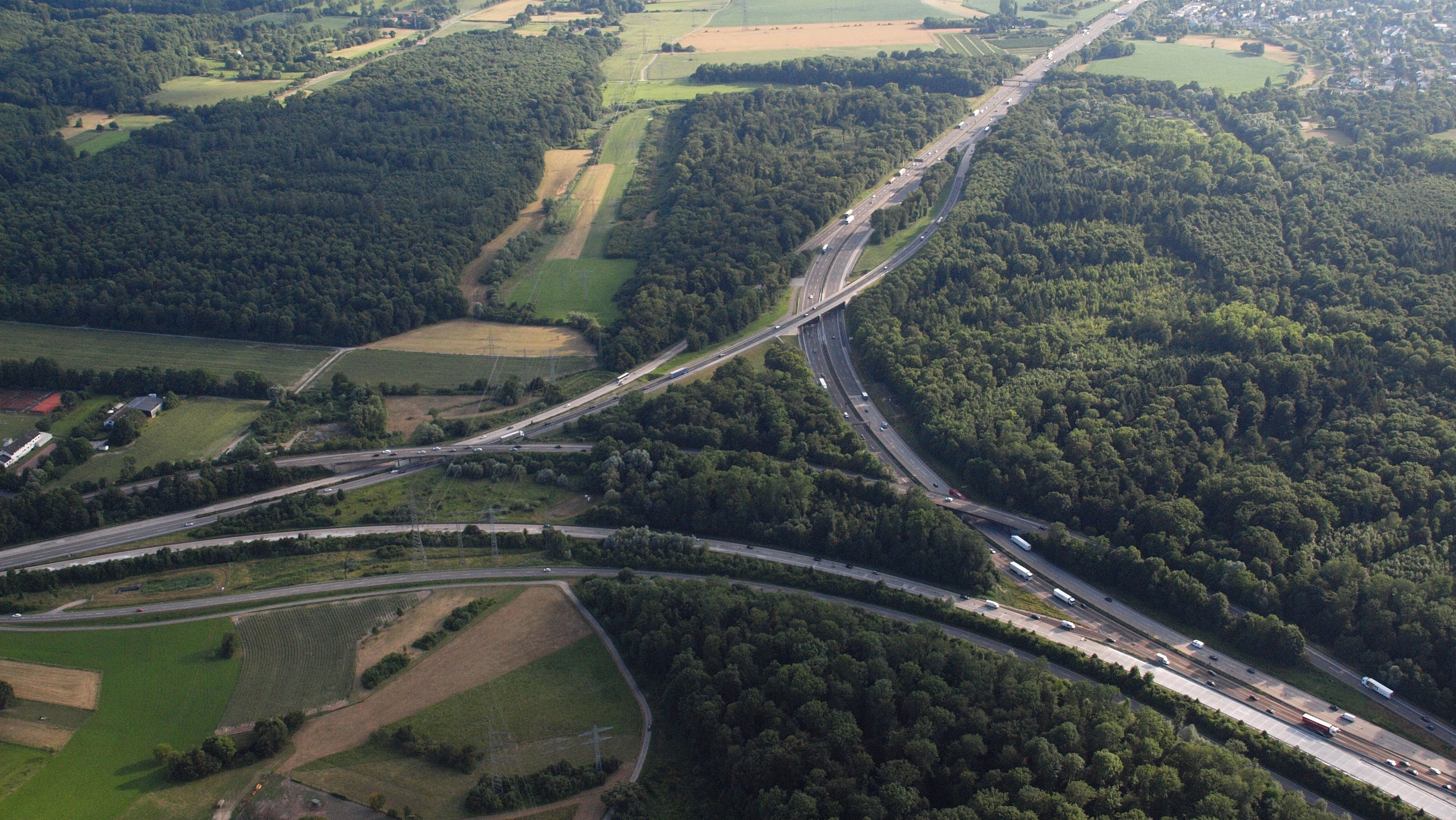
Autobahndreieck at Karlsruhe
