= Jussi Elo =

Finnish diver

Personal information
- Nationality: Finnish
- Born: 6 January 1898; Hämeenlinna, Grand Duchy of Finland
- Died: 15 June 1957 (aged 59); Hämeenlinna, Finland

Sport
- Sport: Diving

Jussi Elo (6 January 1898 – 15 June 1957) was a Finnish diver. He competed in the men's plain high diving event at the 1924 Summer Olympics.
