= Raymond Vincent =

French diver (1906–1979)

Personal information
- Nationality: French
- Born: 5 May 1906; Paris, France
- Died: 30 October 1979 (aged 73); Florianópolis, Brazil

Sport
- Sport: Diving

Raymond Vincent (5 May 1906 – 30 October 1979) was a French diver. He competed in the men's plain high diving event at the 1924 Summer Olympics.

Vincent was the brother of Olympic diver Étienne Vincent.
