= André Cochinal =

French diver

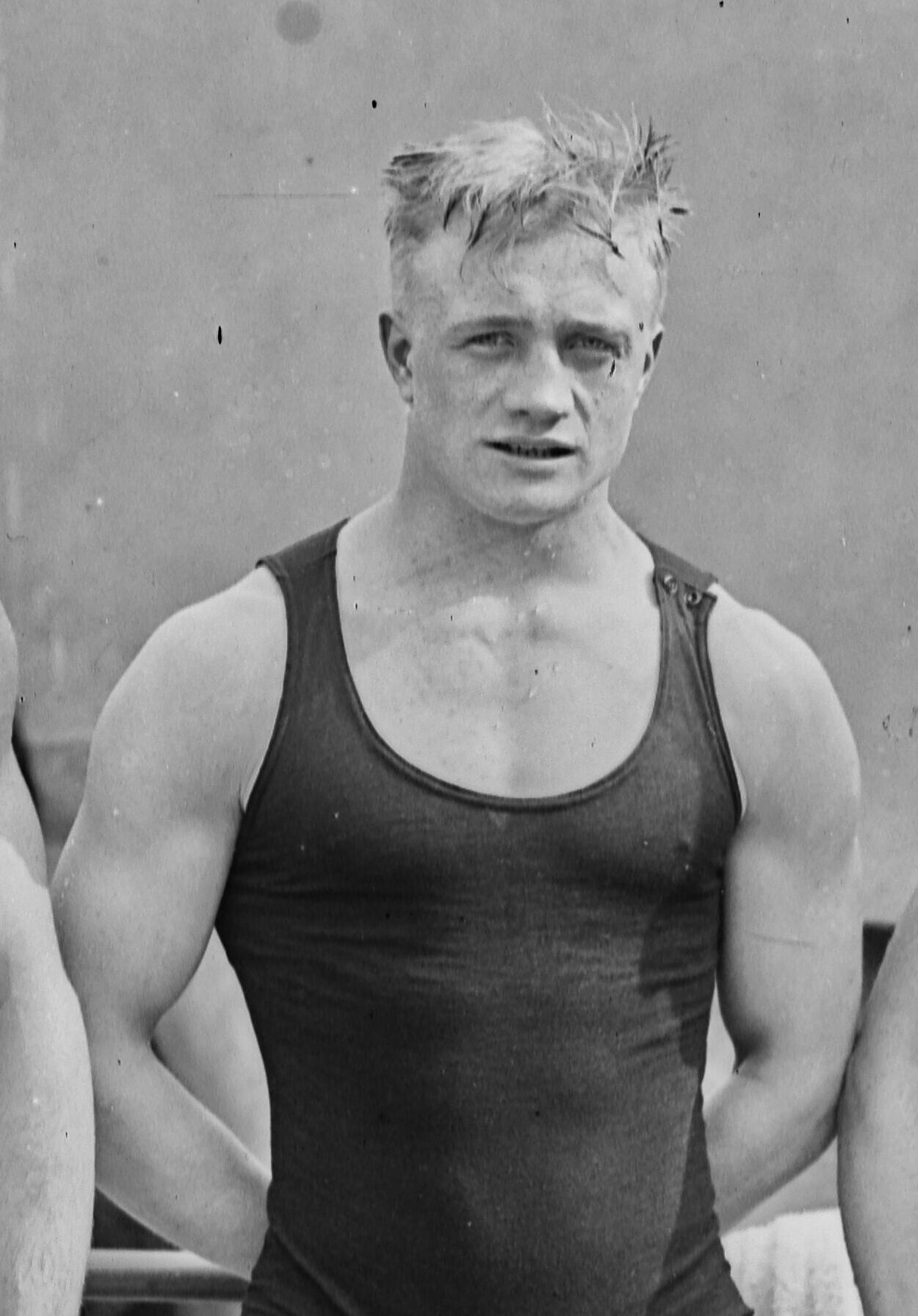
- Aimé Cochinal in 1924

Personal information
- Nationality: French
- Born: 19 April 1905 Lyon, France
- Died: 8 August 1989 (aged 84) Longjumeau, France

Sport
- Sport: Diving

André Cochinal (1905-1989) was a French diver. He competed in the men's 10 metre platform event at the 1924 Summer Olympics.
