= Hannes Kärkkäinen =

Finnish diver

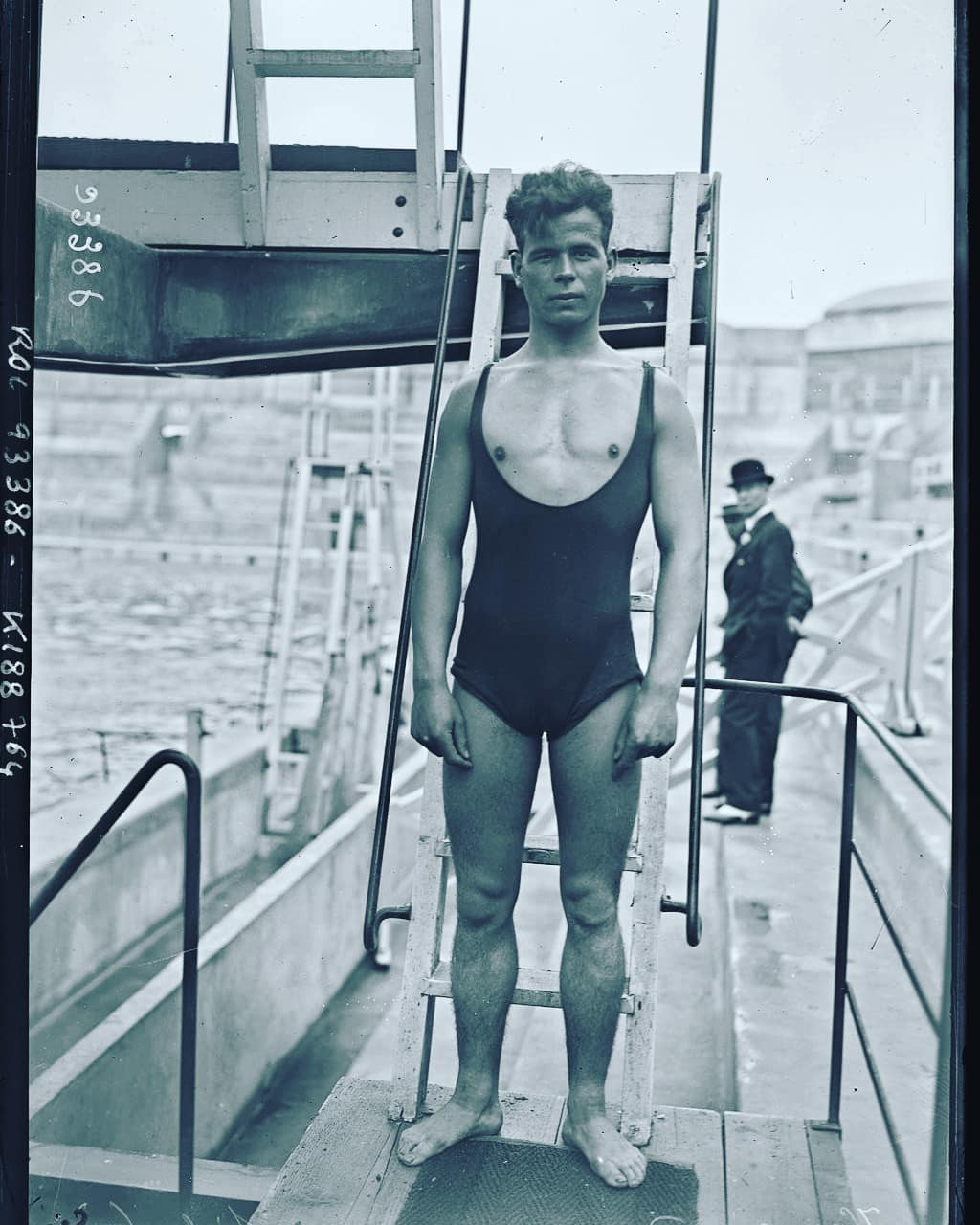
- Kärkkäinen in the 1924 Summer Olympics

Personal information
- Nationality: Finnish
- Born: 17 July 1902; Lappeenranta, Grand Duchy of Finland
- Died: 21 April 1938 (aged 35); Sandarmoh, Russian SFSR, Soviet Union

Sport
- Sport: Diving

Hannes Kärkkäinen (17 July 1902 – 21 April 1938) was a Finnish diver who competed in the men's 10 metre platform event at the 1924 Summer Olympics.
