= Curt Sjöberg =

Swedish artistic gymnast

- Full name: Curt Josef Sjöberg
- Born: 26 January 1897 Stockholm, United Kingdoms of Sweden and Norway
- Died: 12 April 1948 (aged 51) Stockholm, Sweden

Gymnastics career
- Discipline: Men's artistic gymnastics
- Country represented: Sweden
- Club: Stockholms Gymnastikförening; Sim- och Idrottsklubben Hellas
Medal record
Men's artistic gymnastics
Representing Sweden
Olympic Games
Gold medal – first place	1920 Antwerp	Team, Swedish system

Curt Josef Sjöberg (January 26, 1897 – April 12, 1948) was a Swedish gymnast and diver who competed in the 1920 Summer Olympics, in the 1924 Summer Olympics, and in the 1928 Summer Olympics. He was born and died in Stockholm.

Sjöberg was part of the Swedish team, which won the gold medal in the gymnastics men's team, Swedish system event in 1920. In 1924 he finished seventh in the 3 metre springboard competition. Four years later he was eliminated in the first round of the 1928 3 metre springboard event.
