= Atte Lindqvist =

Finnish diver

Personal information
- Nationality: Finnish
- Born: 26 October 1894; Vyborg, Russian Empire
- Died: 26 June 1972 (aged 77); Helsinki, Finland

Sport
- Sport: Diving

Atte Lindqvist (26 October 1894 – 26 June 1972) was a Finnish diver. He competed in the men's 3 metre springboard event at the 1924 Summer Olympics.
