= Gustave Van Heymbeeck =

Belgian diver

Personal information
- Nationality: Belgian
- Born: 20 May 1900

Sport
- Sport: Diving

Gustave Van Heymbeeck (born 20 May 1900, date of death unknown) was a Belgian diver. He competed in two events at the 1924 Summer Olympics.
