= M. N. Sathyaardhi =

Indian writer

M. N. Sathyardhi
- Born: 13 April 1913; Lahore, British India
- Died: July 4, 1998 (aged 85)
- Occupation: writer

M.N. Sathyardhi (1913-1998) was a writer and freedom fighter from Kerala, India.

== Early life ==
He was born on 13 April 1913 in Lahore in Punjab. His father was a Malayali working in the Punjab government service. After intermediate studies he joined National College, Lahore, but could not complete his studies due to his involvement in the freedom struggle. In 1928, he was arrested in connection with the Anders assassination case and was exiled to India. He reached Calcutta where he met Bhagat Singh and became a member of Hindustan Socialist Republic Association. He had to go underground to escape arrest and he reached Punjab where he was associated with Anusheelan Samithi an extremist organisation. He spent two years there and got armed training from the organisation. Following the assassination of the Governor of Punjab he was again arrested and sentenced for rigorous imprisonment. While in jail, he took his Honors in Urdu language. While being taken to the prison in the Andamans, he escaped police custody and went underground. He became involved in the activities of the Communist Party of India. In 1946 he joined a journal named Progressive Papers Ltd. and in 1947, following the partition of India, he came to India as a refugee. In addition to Malayalam and English he was proficient in Hindi, Punjabi, Urdu, Bengali, and Persian. In 1958, he came to Kerala and settled in Kozhikode. He got the Kerala Sahitya Academy award for his work on India's freedom struggle, 'Swathanthrya Samaram' in 1989, and for lifetime contribution in 1996. He died on 4 July 1998.

== Works ==
- Vilaykku vaangam (വിലക്ക് വാങ്ങാം) Translation from Bengali .. of Bimal Mithra
- Prabhukkalum Bhrutyarum
- Jahannara
- Begum Mary Biswas
- Jawaharlal Nehru
- Netajiyude Balyam
- Chourangi
- Agneeswaran
- Nellinte Geetham
- Mushinja Pudava
- Muyalinte Lokam
- Padma Meghna
- Rakthasakshikal
- Navika kalapathile Idimuzhakkam
- Golanthara Yathra
- Goopiyum Baghayum
