= Albert White (diver) =

American diver (1895–1982)

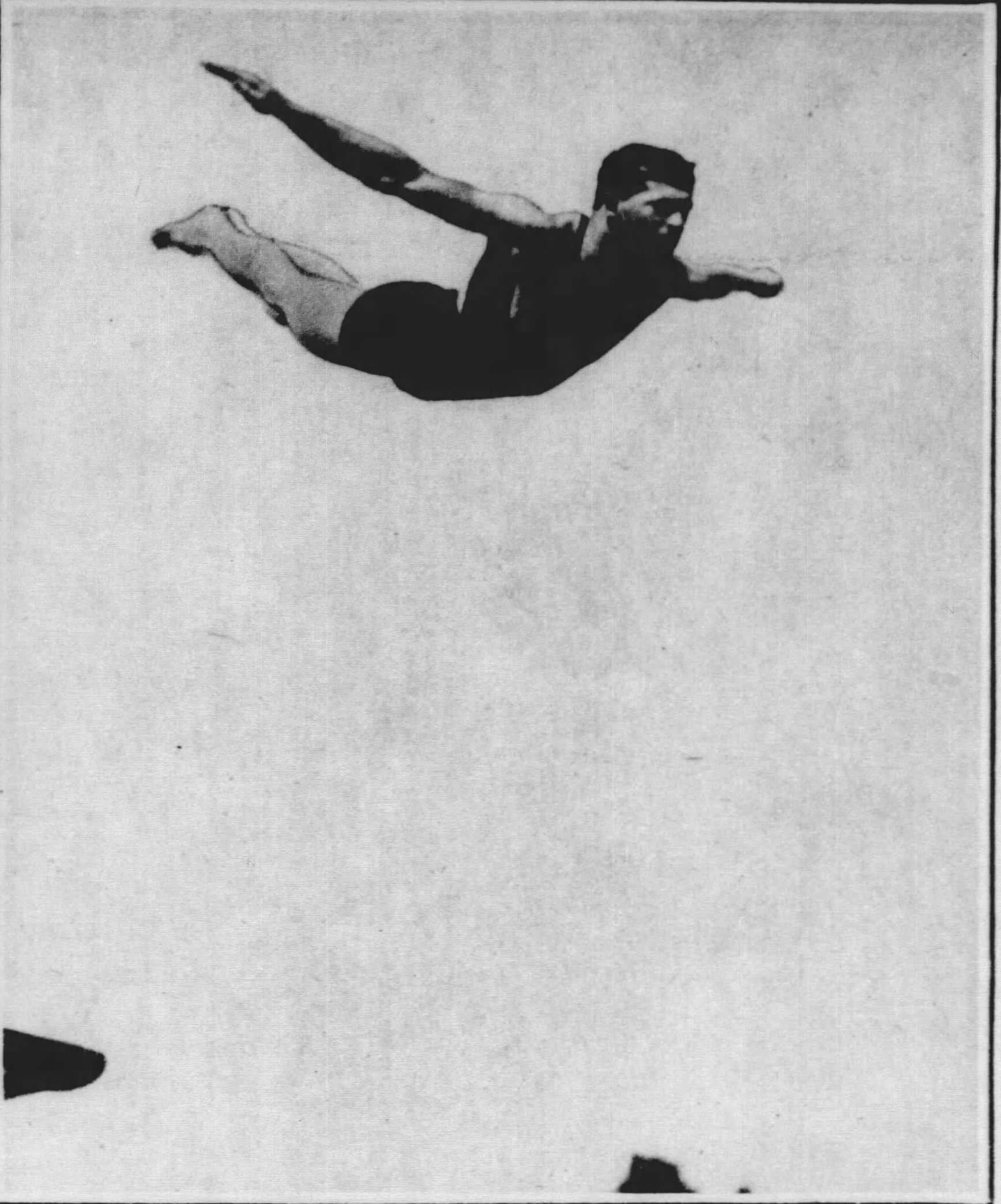
- White doing a swan dive in 1925

Personal information
- Born: May 14, 1895 Oakland, California, United States
- Died: July 8, 1982 (aged 87) Richmond, California, United States

Sport
- Sport: Diving
Medal record
Representing the United States
Olympic Games
Gold medal – first place	1924 Paris	3 m springboard
Gold medal – first place	1924 Paris	10 m platform

Albert Cosad White (May 14, 1895 – July 8, 1982) was an American diver who competed in the 1924 Summer Olympics. He competed collegiately for Stanford University, and was also the captain of Stanford's gymnastics team, which won the Pacific Coast Conference championship in 1921.

In 1924 he won the gold medal in the 3 m springboard competition as well as in the 10 metre platform event.

== See also ==
- List of members of the International Swimming Hall of Fame
