= Harold Clarke (diver) =

British diver

Personal information
- Born: 1888 Wandsworth, Great Britain
- Died: 11 March 1969 (aged 80–81) Christchurch, New Zealand

Sport
- Sport: Diving
Medal record
Representing Great Britain
Olympic Games
Bronze medal – third place	1924 Paris	plain high diving

Harold Clarke (1888 – 11 March 1969) was a British diver who competed in the 1908 Summer Olympics, in the 1920 Summer Olympics, and in the 1924 Summer Olympics.

In 1908 he was eliminated in the semi-finals of the 3 metre springboard competition. Twelve years later he finished ninth in the plain high diving event. In 1924 he won the bronze medal in the plain high diving competition.
