= Luigi Cangiullo =

Italian diver (1897–1930)

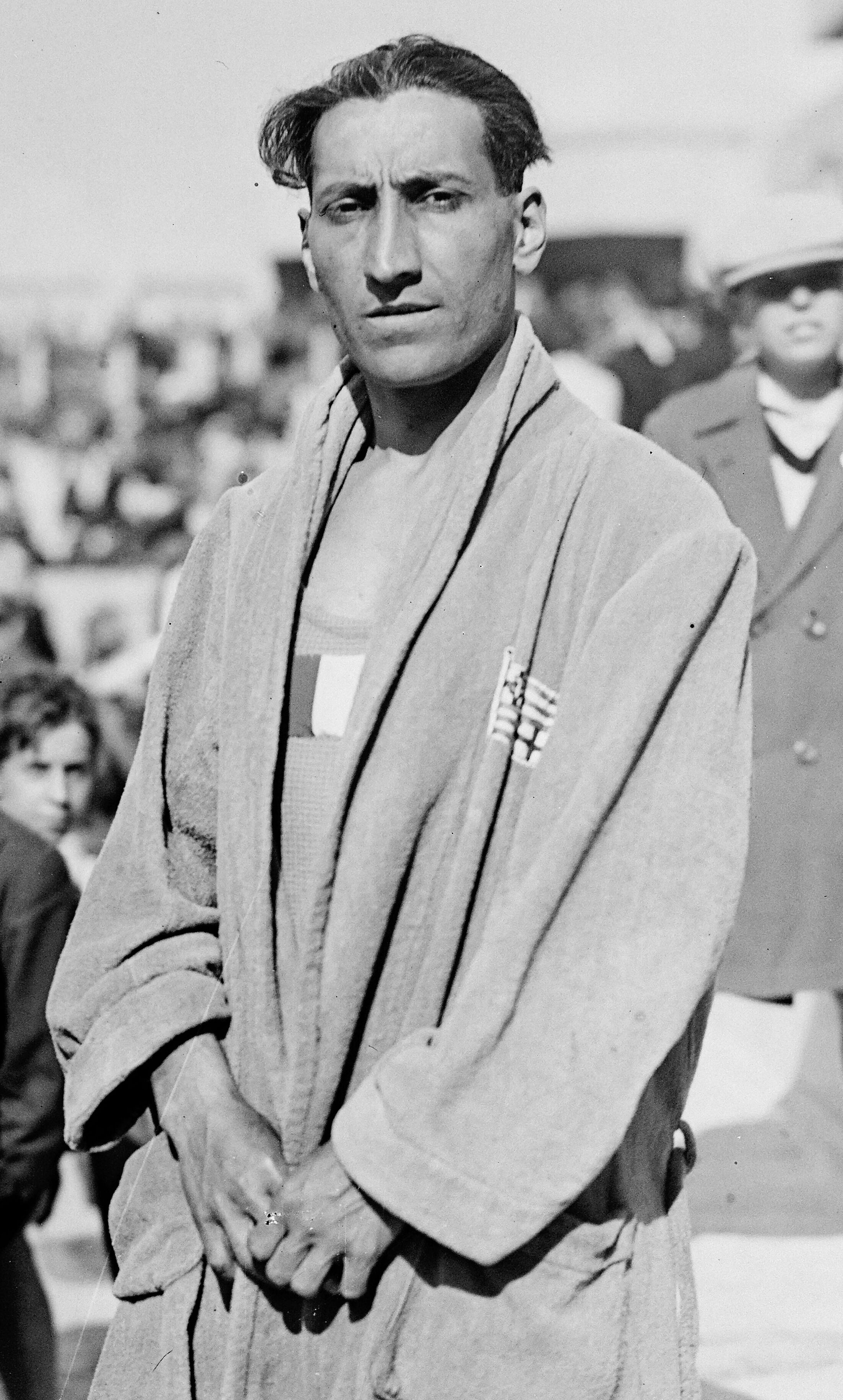
- Luigi Cangiullo in 1928

Personal information
- Nationality: Italian
- Born: 1897; Naples, Kingdom of Italy
- Died: 1 September 1930 (aged 32–33); Milan, Kingdom of Italy

Sport
- Sport: Diving

Luigi Cangiullo (1897 – 1 September 1930) was an Italian diver. He competed at the 1924 Summer Olympics and the 1928 Summer Olympics.
