= Arthur Bischoff =

Swiss diver

Personal information
- Nationality: Swiss
- Born: 12 May 1901
- Died: 25 August 1976 (aged 75)

Sport
- Sport: Diving

Arthur Bischoff (12 May 1901 – 25 August 1976) was a Swiss diver. He competed at the 1924 Summer Olympics and the 1928 Summer Olympics.
