= Volmer Otzen =

Danish diver

Personal information
- Nationality: Danish
- Born: 3 October 1899; Copenhagen, Denmark
- Died: 26 December 1979 (aged 80); Hovedstaden, Denmark

Sport
- Sport: Diving

Volmer Otzen (3 October 1899 – 26 December 1979) was a Danish diver. He competed in the men's plain high diving event at the 1924 Summer Olympics.
