= Étienne Vincent =

French diver (1902–1998)

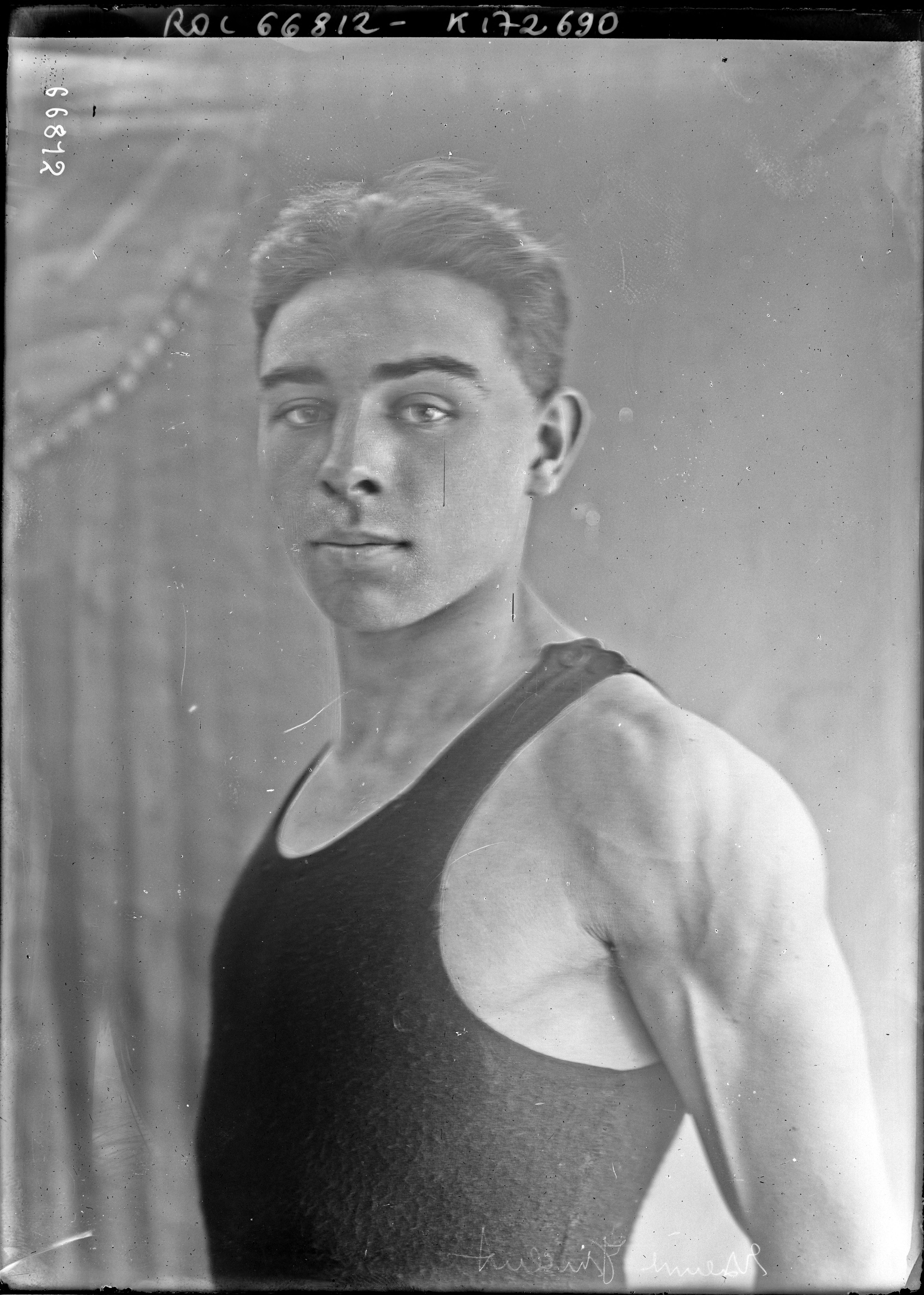

Personal information
- Full name: Étienne Jules Marie Alexandre Vincent
- Nationality: French
- Born: 27 October 1902 Nantes, France
- Died: 25 July 1998 (aged 95) Tournan-en-Brie, France

Sport
- Sport: Diving

c

Étienne Vincent (27 October 1902 – 25 July 1998) was a French diver. He competed in the men's 10 metre platform event at the 1924 Summer Olympics.

Vincent was the brother of Olympic diver Raymond Vincent.
