= David Fall =

American diver (1902–1964)

Dave Fall
Personal information
- Full name: David Athelstane Fall
- Born: December 4, 1902 Fairland, Oklahoma, U.S.
- Died: November 9, 1964 (aged 61) San Bernardino, California, U.S.
Medal record
Diving
Representing United States
Olympic Games
| Silver medal – second place | 1924 Paris | 10 m platform |

David Athelstane "Dave" Fall (December 4, 1902 – November 9, 1964) was an American diver who competed at the 1924 Summer Olympics.

Fall competed collegiately for Oregon State University and Stanford University. At the 1924 Olympics, he won the silver medal in the 10 metre platform event.
