= Dick Eve =

Australian diver

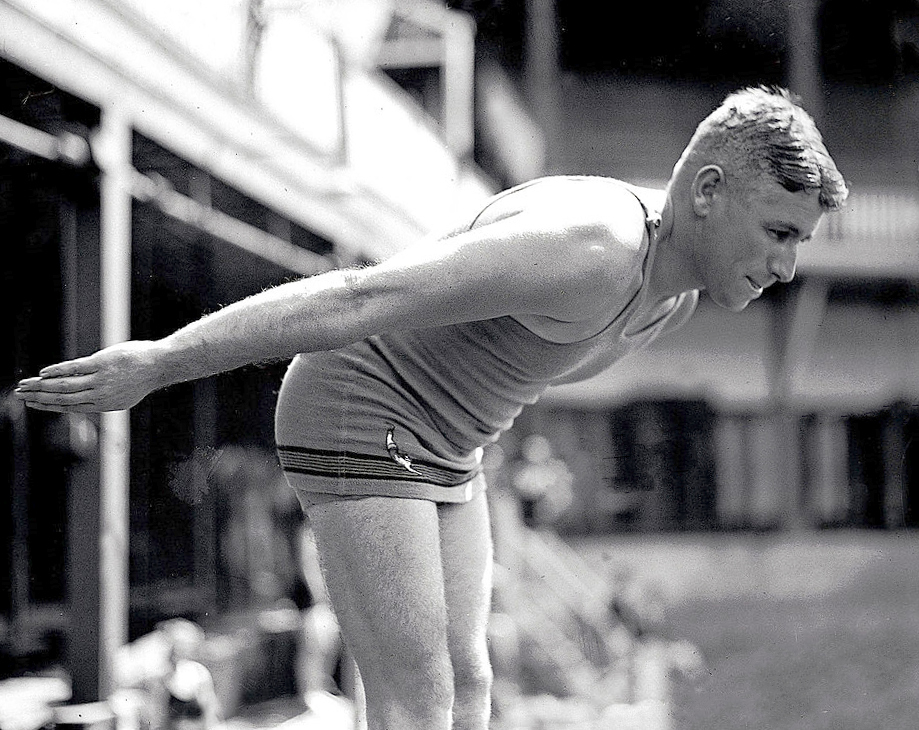
- Dick Eve in the 1920s

Personal information
- Born: 19 March 1901 Parramatta, New South Wales, Australia
- Died: 13 March 1970 (aged 68) Concord, New South Wales, Australia
- Height: 1.68 m (5 ft 6 in)

Sport
- Sport: Diving
- Club: Manly Amateur Swimming Club
Medal record
Representing Australia
Olympic Games
| Gold medal – first place | 1924 Paris | plain high diving |

Richmond Cavill "Dick" Eve (19 March 1901 – 13 March 1970) was an Australian diver who competed in the 1924 Summer Olympics. He won the gold medal in the plain high diving and finished fifth in the 3 metre springboard event. He was the first Australian Olympic diver to win a gold medal.

== Swimming career ==
Following the 1924 Olympics, Eve was barred from membership of Manly Amateur Swimming Club as he was considered a professional since he managed manly baths and lived on site. His "professional status" meant he was also ineligible for selection for the 1928 Summer Olympics.

== Personal life ==
Eve was the son of Albert Sidney Eve, a well-known swim instructor, and Fredda Cavill Eve, a member of the famous Cavill swimming family. His grandfather was Frederick Cavill and his brother was Australian sports administrator Jim Eve.

== See also ==
- List of members of the International Swimming Hall of Fame
