= Eugène Lenormand =

French diver

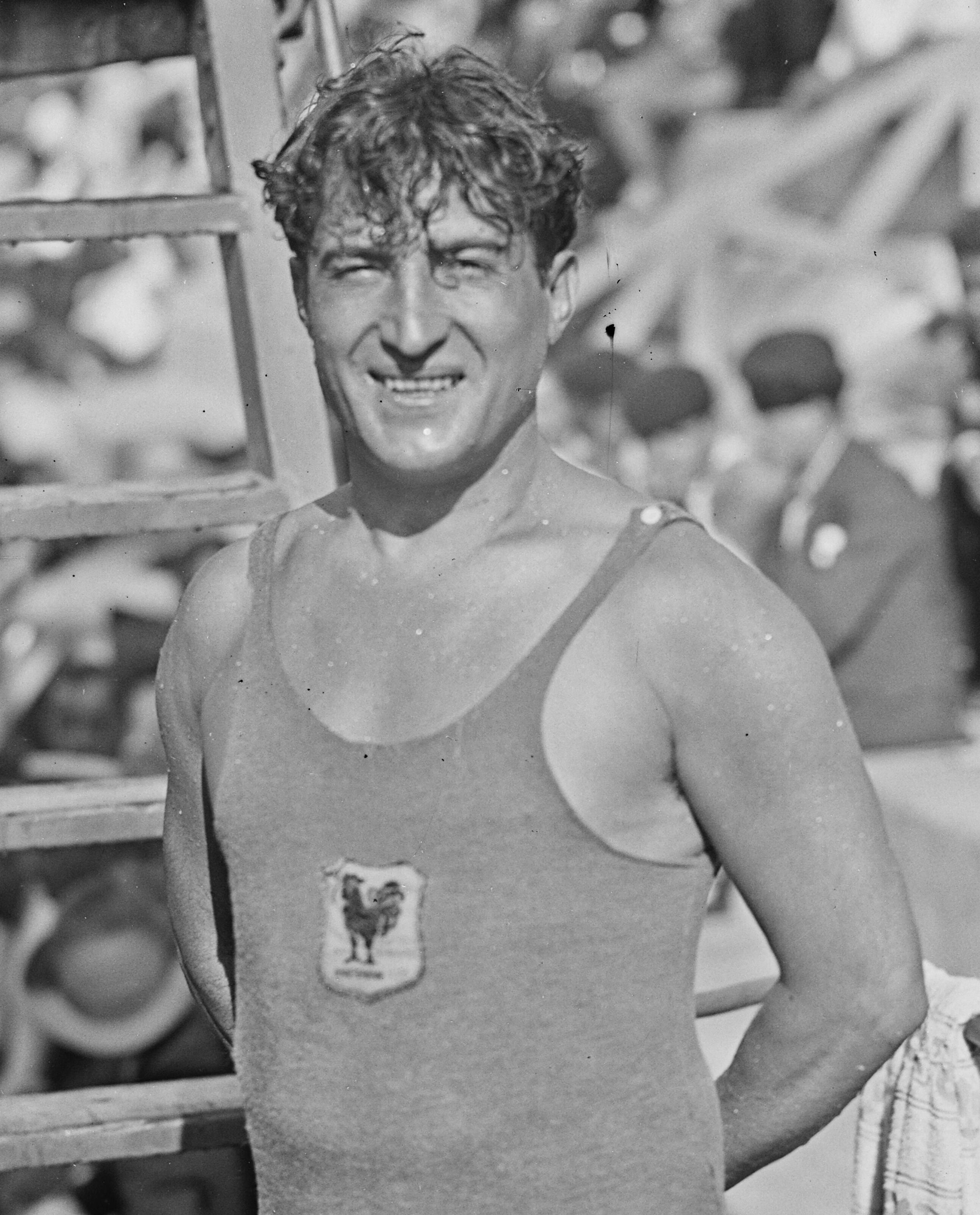
- Eugène Lenormand in 1929

Personal information
- Nationality: French
- Born: 9 October 1891; Paris, France
- Died: 9 January 1974 (aged 82); Paris, France

Sport
- Sport: Diving

Eugène Lenormand (9 October 1891 – 9 January 1974) was a French diver. He competed at the 1924 Summer Olympics and the 1928 Summer Olympics.
