= Adolf Hellquist =

Swedish diver

Personal information
- Nationality: Swedish
- Born: 30 August 1901; Stockholm, Sweden-Norway
- Died: 9 December 1971 (aged 70); Stockholm, Sweden

Sport
- Sport: Diving

Adolf Hellquist (30 August 1901 – 9 December 1971) was a Swedish diver. He competed in two events at the 1924 Summer Olympics.
