= Antonio de Tort =

Spanish diver

Personal information
- Nationality: Spanish
- Born: 1893 Barcelona, Spain
- Died: Unknown

Sport
- Sport: Diving

Antonio de Tort (born 1893, date of death unknown) was a Spanish diver. He competed in two events at the 1924 Summer Olympics.
