= Robert Otzen =

German infrastructure engineer

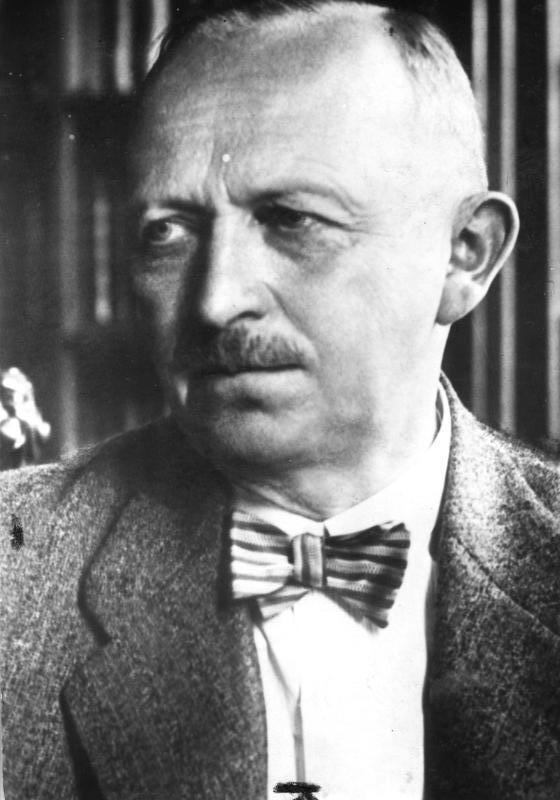
Robert Otzen (1932)

Robert Friedrich Ehlert Otzen (9 May 1872 in Giesensdorf – 3 October 1934 in Hanover) was a German infrastructure engineer.

He is considered the inventor of the word Autobahn when he was head of the Stufa car lobby group (Bahn being the German word for railway), the equivalent of motorway (British English) or freeway (US English).. When a single high speed roadway was built on the Hamburg-Frankfurt-Basel route, Otzen felt that only an entire network of such roads would attract the political support needed for such a project to be built.
