= Elizabeth Karlin =

Doctor of internal medicine and women's health

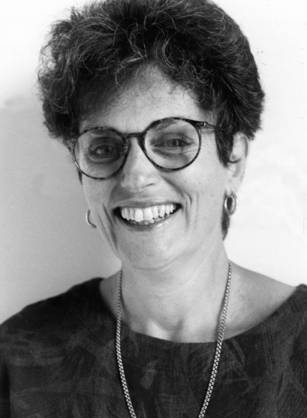
- Born: March 3, 1944; New York City, New York, U.S.
- Died: July 27, 1998 (aged 54); Arena, Wisconsin, U.S.
- Education: Antioch College; University of Wisconsin
- Occupations: Internal Medicine; Feminist; Activist

Elizabeth Ann Karlin (March 3, 1944 – July 27, 1998) was an American doctor of internal medicine and women's health as well a leading advocate for women's reproductive rights. By mentoring the founders of Medical Students for Choice, Karlin helped clinicians to provide women with comprehensive care, including timely access to abortion. Originally from New York City, Karlin worked for a short time in Tanzania, where her husband Steven Feierman was engaging in research, before returning to her home in Madison, Wisconsin where she worked throughout the duration of her career. Through her work with abortion access, Karlin was recognized for her work commitment to serving women and her pro-choice stance.

== Education ==
Karlin attended and graduated from Bronx High School of Science, an elite and specialized public high school in New York City; she graduated at 16 years old. Karlin then went on to achieve her bachelor's degree from Antioch College in Ohio. After receiving her bachelor's degree from Antioch College, Elizabeth Karlin attended the University of Wisconsin School of Medicine and Public Health to receive her M.D.

== Career ==
At the beginning of her career, Karlin worked as a general practitioner in Tanzania. After returning from Tanzania, Karlin went back to Madison, Wisconsin and worked in an internal medicine practice. In 1990, after concern about the lack of physicians trained in abortions, Karlin changed her practice from internal medicine to women's health after first studying with a fellow physician in Madison. Karlin then became the director of the Women's Clinic in Madison Wisconsin's West Side.

Karlin thought of herself as an unapologetic feminist physician and fought for women's reproductive rights and female healthcare. Through her work she became an advocate for women's rights and health issues. In the late 1980’s, she advocated locally and nationally for pro-choice rights. She explained in the New York Times that "I don't do abortions because it's a filthy job and somebody has to do it. I do them because it is the most challenging medicine I can think of. I provide women with nurturing, preventive care to counteract a violent religious and political environment. I hope to do it well enough to prevent repeat abortions. Like coronary artery surgery, an abortion is a response to things gone wrong. It is not the underlying disease. Ignoring the disease is bad medicine."

== Death and legacy ==
Karlin died at the age of 54 on July 27, 1998, in her home in Wisconsin, due to complications from a brain tumor. She was survived by her children Joshua and Jessica Feierman and her partner Anne Topham. The Elizabeth Karlin Fellowship in Women's Health was created and is awarded by the University of Wisconsin to women who train to become leaders in areas of women's health and women's health research. Medical Students for Choice established the Elizabeth Karlin Early Achievement Award in her name.

== Awards and achievements ==
- 1992 – Feminist of the Year Award - Wisconsin Chapter of the National Organization for Women
- 1996 – Elizabeth Blackwell Award - Given to "women physicians who have made an outstanding contribution to the cause of women in the field of medicine."
