= Henk Hemsing =

Dutch diver

Personal information
- Nationality: Dutch
- Born: 20 September 1891; Amsterdam, Netherlands
- Died: 1 April 1971 (aged 79); Hilversum, Netherlands

Sport
- Sport: Diving

Henk Hemsing (20 September 1891 – 1 April 1971) was a Dutch diver. He competed in three events at the 1924 Summer Olympics.
