= Sven Palle Sørensen =

Danish diver

Personal information
- Nationality: Danish
- Born: 23 November 1898; Copenhagen, Denmark
- Died: 9 January 1978 (aged 79); Frederiksberg, Denmark

Sport
- Sport: Diving

Sven Palle Sørensen (23 November 1898 – 9 January 1978) was a Danish diver. He competed at the 1920 Summer Olympics and the 1924 Summer Olympics.
