= Kazimierz Sokołowski (ice hockey) =

Polish ice hockey player

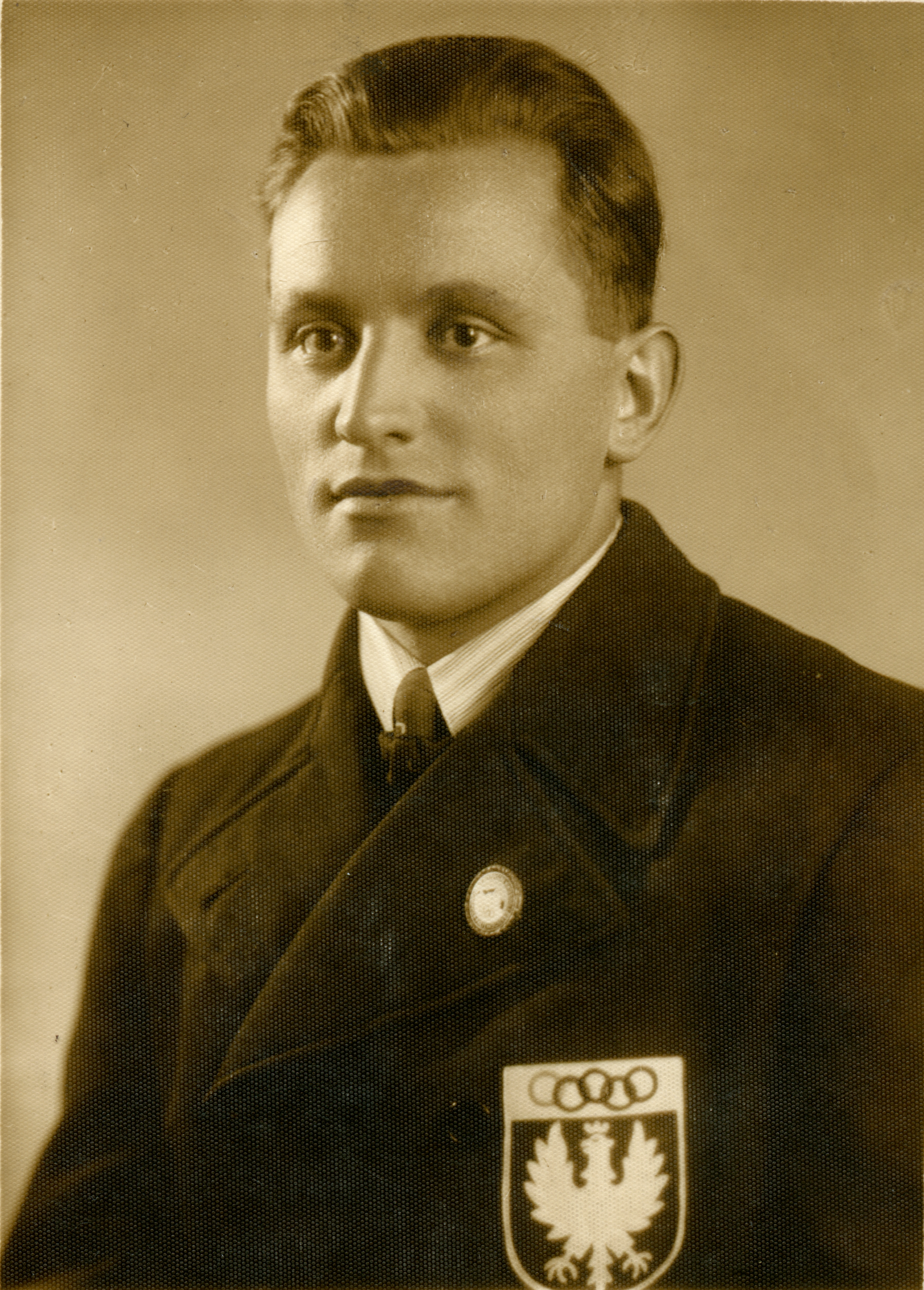
- Kazimierz Sokołowski
- Born: 26 March 1908 Lemberg, Austria-Hungary (now Lviv, Ukraine)
- Died: 3 July 1998 (aged 90) Tarnów, Poland
- Height: 5 ft 11 in (180 cm)
- Weight: 172 lb (78 kg; 12 st 4 lb)
- Position: Defence
- Played for: Lechia Lwów; Wisła Kraków
- National team: Poland
- Playing career: 1929–1947

Kazimierz Jan Sokołowski (26 March 1908 – 3 July 1998), was a Polish ice hockey player. He played for Lechia Lwów and Wisła Kraków during his career. He also played for the Polish national team at the 1932 and 1936 Winter Olympics, and multiple World Championships.
