= Santiago Ulio =

Spanish diver

Personal information
- Nationality: Spanish
- Born: 31 May 1909; Barcelona, Spain
- Died: 3 June 1981 (aged 72); Barcelona, Spain

Sport
- Sport: Diving

Santiago Ulio (31 May 1909 – 3 June 1981) was a Spanish diver. He competed in two events at the 1924 Summer Olympics.
