= Albert Knight (diver) =

British diver

Personal information
- Full name: Albert Reginald Knight
- Nationality: British
- Born: 1900
- Died: 1964 (aged 63–64) Romford, England

Sport
- Sport: Diving
Medal record
Representing Great Britain
European Championships
Bronze medal – third place	1926 Budapest	Platform

Albert Reginald "Reggie" Knight (1900–1964) was a British diver. He competed at the 1924 Summer Olympics and the 1928 Summer Olympics.
