= Diving at the 1924 Summer Olympics =

Diving at the Games of the VIII Olympiad
- Venue: Piscine des Tourelles
- Dates: 14 July 1924 through 20 July 1924
- No. of events: 5
- Competitors: 71 from 14 nations

At the 1924 Summer Olympics in Paris, five diving events were contested. The competitions were held from Monday, 14 July 1924 to Sunday, 20 July 1924.

== Medal summary ==
The events are labelled as 3 metre springboard, 10 metre platform and plain high diving by the International Olympic Committee, and appeared on the 1924 Official Report as plongeons du tremplin, plongeons de haut vol variés (men) or plongeons de haut vol ordinaires (women) and plongeons de haut vol ordinaires (men), respectively. The high diving and 10 metre platform events included dives from both 10 metre and 5 metre platforms, while the springboard events included dives from 3 metre and 1 metre springboards.

=== Men ===
Event	Gold	Silver	Bronze
3 m springboard	Albert White (USA)	Pete Desjardins (USA)	Clarence Pinkston (USA)
10 m platform	Albert White (USA)	David Fall (USA)	Clarence Pinkston (USA)
Plain high diving	Dick Eve (AUS)	John Jansson (SWE)	Harold Clarke (GBR)

=== Women ===
Event	Gold	Silver	Bronze
3 m springboard	Elizabeth Becker-Pinkston (USA)	Aileen Riggin (USA)	Caroline Fletcher (USA)
10 m platform	Caroline Smith (USA)	Elizabeth Becker-Pinkston (USA)	Hjördis Töpel (SWE)

== Participating nations ==
A total of 71 divers (45 men and 26 women) from 14 nations (men from 13 nations - women from 9 nations) competed at the Paris Games:

- Australia (1) (men:1 women:0)
- Austria (3) (men:0 women:3)
- Belgium (2) (men:1 women:1)
- Czechoslovakia (2) (men:1 women:1)
- Denmark (4) (men:3 women:1)
- Finland (6) (men:6 women:0)
- France (12) (men:9 women:3)
- Great Britain (11) (men:5 women:6)
- Italy (1) (men:1 women:0)
- Netherlands (4) (men:2 women:2)
- Spain (3) (men:3 women:0)
- Sweden (11) (men:7 women:4)
- Switzerland (1) (men:1 women:0)
- United States (10) (men:5 women:5)

== Medal table ==
Rank	Nation	Gold	Silver	Bronze	Total
1	United States	4	4	3	11
2	Australia	1	0	0	1
3	Sweden	0	1	1	2
4	Great Britain	0	0	1	1
Totals (4 entries)		5	5	5	15
