= Cosmetology =

Study and application of beauty treatment

Cosmetology (from Greek κοσμητικός, kosmētikos, 'beautifying'; and -λογία, -logia, 'study of') is the study and application of beauty treatment. Branches of specialty include hairstyling, skin care, cosmetics, manicures/pedicures, non-permanent hair removal such as waxing and sugaring, and permanent hair removal processes such as electrology and intense pulsed light (IPL).

In the United States as of 2018, an occupational license is required in all states to be a cosmetologist, with the average cost of a certificate from a for-profit school being $17,000 and 1,500 required hours (ten times the hours required for an EMT) with cosmetologists making a median wage of $25,000.

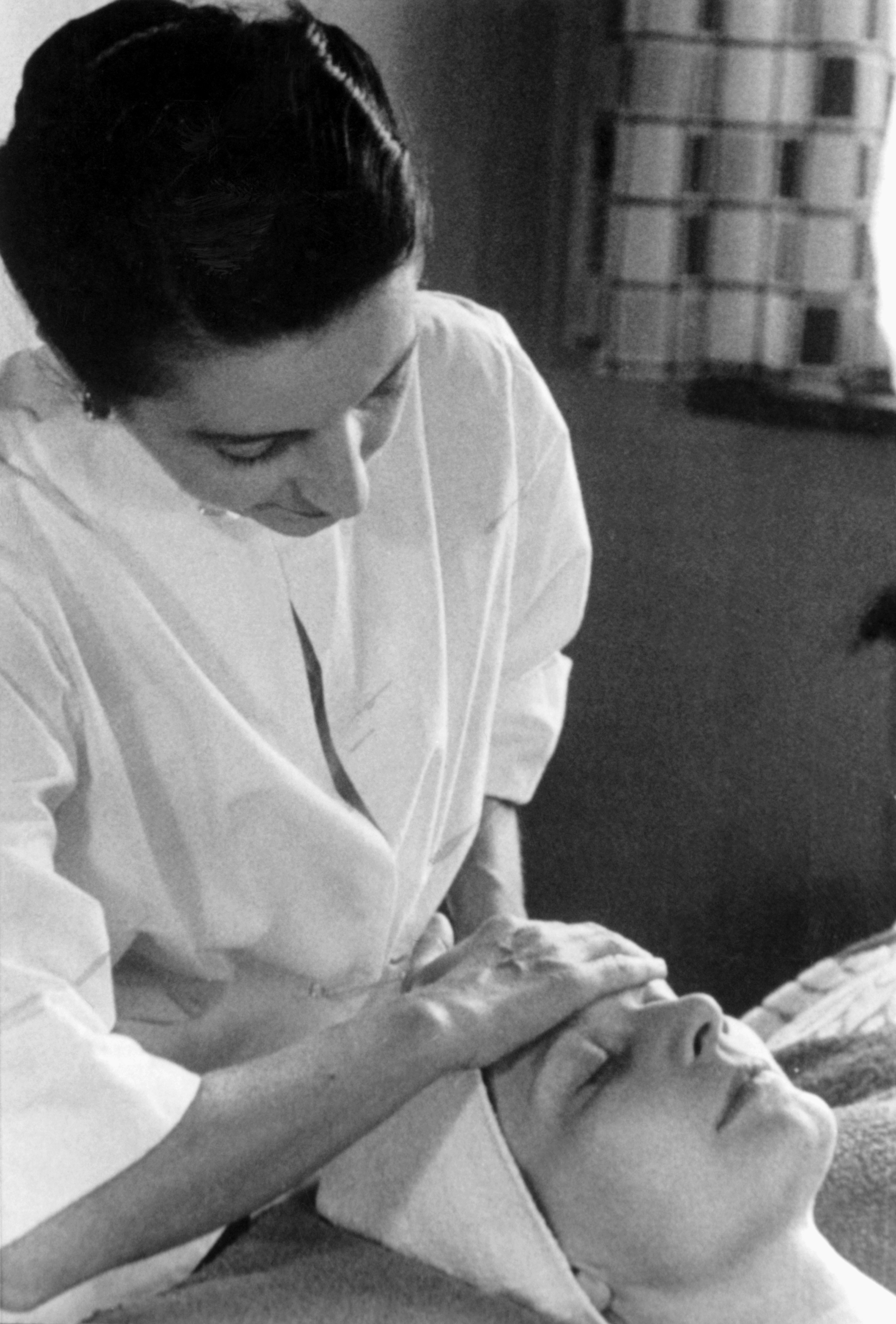
Austrian cosmetologist and entrepreneur Elisabeth Sigmund with a client, 1957

== History ==
=== Origin ===
The history of cosmetology dates all the way back to ancient times. Cosmetology is believed to have originated in Ancient Egypt but can be traced back to many countries around the world.Egyptians used black eyeliner known as Kohl, not only for aesthetic purposes, but because they believed it protected their eyes against the sun. They also used natural ingredients like milk and honey to keep their skin soft and fresh. Many of the practices done in ancient Egypt are still used today in some variation.

=== Cosmetics In Ancient China ===
In late imperial China, cosmetics greatly influenced gender identity and the conceptualization of masculinity and femininity. Although fashion trends changed with time, a consistency found throughout paintings, whether they were from the Han or Tang dynasty, is that femininity was conveyed using three primary colors: white, red, and black. White lead powder was commonly used in imperial China, both in paintings and on the skin, to give the skin a pale complexion. Black pigments, like soot ink or charred wood, were used to color the eyebrows. And for the red pigments, safflower and shellac were most commonly used for the cheeks and lips. It was very popular in China to use cosmetics, that were meant for the face, in their paintings as well. Because the use of cosmetics in paintings are able to reflect the cosmetic trends at the time, historians were able to notice the influence western regions had on cosmetic trends in China and were able to link that influence back to the silk road exchange.

=== Cosmetics in America ===
In the eighteenth century, makeup was thought to be for both men and women. This changed soon after the American Revolution, as makeup used by any gender slowly started to become socially unacceptable. Makeup became associated with prostitution and was deemed vulgar, so women had to be discrete when applying any sort of cosmetic to their face. Women used ashes to darken their eyebrows, berries to stain their lips and cheeks, and makeshift creams to brighten the appearance of their skin. By the 1880's, entrepreneurs were creating and marketing their own product lines. For example, Florence Nightengale Grahm was a daughter of tenant farmers, and worked many low paying jobs. Eventually, she created her own elite cosmetic line and rebranded herself, along with her cosmetic brand, as Elizabeth Arden, which continues to be a successful beauty care line today. Although, makeup was becoming more socially acceptable, African Americans had a hard time finding beauty product suited for their skin and white beauty shop owners refused to sell any. That was until Madam C.J. Walker, and businesses alike, began gaining traction and demand through other ways of distribution. Although today a career in cosmetology is widely accepted and respected, back then it wasn't taken seriously. It wasn't until 1995 that the first museum of Cosmetology and Arts opened its doors. Hairdressing was transformed from a trade into a reputable career with the help of Paula Kent Meehan. Meehan took a scientific approach to cosmetics and combined the two by creating beauty care products based on the skin and hairs natural PH, this was a major breakthrough for people with sensitive skin that also wanted to indulge in cosmetics. This shift in hairdressing led future hairstylists to be trained intensively on the sciences behind hair chemistry.

== Cosmetology specialties ==
=== Cosmetologist ===
Cosmetologists are trained and licensed to perform cosmetic treatments to the hair, skin, and nails. This can be expanded into multiple parts including cutting and chemically treating hair, chemical hair removal, fashion trends, wigs, nails and skin care, skin and hair analysis; relaxation techniques including head, neck, scalp, hand and feet basic massage and aroma therapies; plus ability to expertly apply makeup applications to cover up dark spots or promote and can expand into further specialties such as reflexology; theatrical applications; cosmetics and others as listed below.

=== Esthetician ===
Estheticians are licensed professionals who are experts in maintaining and improving skin. An esthetician's general scope of practice is limited to the epidermis (the outer layer of skin). Estheticians work in many different environments such as salons, medi-spas, day spas, skin care clinics, and private practices. Estheticians may also specialize in treatments such as microdermabrasion, microcurrent (also known as non-surgical "face lifts"), cosmetic electrotherapy treatments (galvanic current, high frequency), LED (light-emitting diode) treatments, ultrasound/ultrasonic (low level), and mechanical massage (vacuum and G8 muscle vibrating).

An esthetician may undergo special training for treatments such as laser hair removal, permanent makeup application, light chemical peels, eyelash extensions, microblading, and electrology. In the US, estheticians must be licensed in the state in which they are working and are governed by the cosmetology board requirements of that state. Estheticians must complete a minimum 260–1500 hours of training and pass both a written and hands-on exam in order to be licensed in a given state. Utah, Virginia and Washington were the only states as of April 2015 to adopt the Master Esthetician License. Additional post graduate training is sometimes required when specializing in areas such as medical esthetics (working in a doctor's office). Estheticians work under a dermatologist's supervision only when employed by the dermatologist's practice. Estheticians treat a wide variety of skin issues that are cosmetic in nature, such as mild acne, hyperpigmentation, and aging skin; therefore, clients with skin disease and disorders are referred to a dermatologist or other medical professional. Estheticians are also referred to as beauticians within North America.

== Occupational hazards ==
Many chemicals in salon products pose potential health risks. Examples of hazardous chemicals found in common treatments (e.g., hair coloring, straightening, perms, relaxers, keratin treatments, Brazilian Blowouts, and nail treatments) include dibutyl phthalate, formaldehyde, lye (sodium hydroxide), ammonia, and coal tar. Allergies and dermatitis have forced approximately 20% of hairdressers to stop practicing their profession.

In the beauty and cosmetology industries, some of the products used in hair dyes and nail applications contain chemicals that have been shown to have adverse health effects for cosmetologists. A chemical combination known as the toxic trio is often part of the ingredient list in nail polish, hair dyes, and nail polish removers. The toxic trio consists of formaldehyde, toluene and dibutyl phthalate (DBP). DBP is commonly found in nail polish and is used as a binder to increase the amount of time that the polish stays on the nail. Toluene is an industrial solvent and is usually in nail polish removers. Formaldehyde can be found in a variety of beauty products but is generally found in hair straightening products and hair dyes as well as in some nail polishes. Each chemical member of the toxic trio has independently been found to have adverse reproductive effects in humans, so there concern that the presence of all three chemicals in cosmetologist supplies could pose a detrimental health risk for cosmetologists.

=== Demographics of the cosmetology industry ===
As a profession, cosmetology is predominantly female, with 30-34 years old being the largest age bracket. There are more than one million women registered and licensed as cosmetologists in the United States and roughly several million more work as hair stylists. Among cosmetologists, hairdressers and nail technicians make up a large part of the working population. Many cosmetologists begin their careers before they begin family planning, which may put them at higher risk for reproductive health effects from exposure to workplace cosmetology chemicals.

In the United States the Food and Drug Administration (FDA) is responsible for public safety regarding cosmetic products and the Food, Drug, and Cosmetic Act regulates these products. The Cosmetic Ingredient Review (CIR) utilizes an "Expert Panel" to review available data on cosmetic ingredients and determine whether or not chemical ingredients in cosmetic products are safe to use considering how they are currently utilized. However, this protocol is only helpful if applied to all cosmetology workplaces in the United States.

An investigation carried out by the Environmental Working Group revealed only 11% of more than 10,000 cosmetic ingredients documented by the FDA were evaluated in a CIR review. Research studies have shown that although "toxicological considerations play an increasingly significant role in product formulation; reproductive risks are not typically taken into account. It is also known that, "more than 9,000 chemicals are found in cosmetic products". Hairdressers use a wide range of products containing chemicals. "Hair dyes represent the largest segment of chemical products in the hair market today. As such, they are the main source of chemical exposure among hairdressers".

=== Chemical exposures ===
==== Toluene ====
Toluene is a clear, water insoluble liquid with a distinct and pungent smell, similar to paint thinners. Toluene is found in cosmetic products such as nail polish, nail glue, and hair dyes and is widely used as an industrial solvent and is used to make fingernail polishes, lacquers, adhesives, rubber, and paint thinners. It is used in the production of benzene, gasoline, nylon, plastics, and polyurethane. Toluene can be found on cosmetic labels under the names, benzene, toluol, phenylmethane, and methylbenzene.

Toluene enters the environment when materials like fingernail polish, paints, paint thinners, and adhesives are used. It rapidly mixes with the air and individuals who work with paint, lacquer, or dyes have greater exposures to toluene via dermal and respiratory routes. Toluene inhalation during pregnancy has led to neonatal effects, including intrauterine growth retardation, premature delivery, congenital malformations, and postnatal developmental retardation.

==== Dibutyl phthalate ====
Dibutyl phthalate (DBP) is a manufactured chemical used as a plasticizer. It is used to make plastics more flexible and can be found in paints, glue, insect repellents, hair spray, nail polish, and rocket fuel. Due to its flexibility and film forming properties, it is an ideal ingredient in cosmetics and cosmetology products. DBP is mainly used in nail products as a solvent for dyes and as a plasticizer that prevents nail polishes from becoming brittle, but is also used in hair sprays, to help avoid stiffness by allowing them to form a flexible film on the hair.

Dibutyl phthalate has been linked to reproductive issues in humans if the mother is exposed while pregnant and has been banned for use by the European Union and certain phthalate esters have been shown to cause reproductive toxicity in animal models.

==== Formaldehyde ====
Formaldehyde is a colorless, strong smelling liquid that is highly volatile, making exposure to both workers and clients potentially unhealthy. Both the Environmental Protection Agency (EPA) and the Occupational Safety and Health Administration (OSHA) classify formaldehyde as a human carcinogen. Formaldehyde has been linked to nasal and lung cancer, with possible links to brain cancer and leukemia.

Growing evidence reveals that various popular hair-smoothing treatments contain formaldehyde and release formaldehyde as a gas. Formaldehyde is a common ingredient in Brazilian blowouts, Cadiveu, and Keratin Complete Smoothing Therapies. Four laboratories in California, Oregon, and Canada, confirmed a popular hair straightening treatment, the Brazilian Blowout, contained between 4% and 12% formaldehyde. Oregon OSHA demonstrated that other keratin-based hair smoothing products also contain formaldehyde, with concentrations from 1% to 7%.

Formaldehyde may be present in hair smoothing solutions or as a vapor in the air. Stylists and clients may inhale formaldehyde as a gas or a vapor into the lungs and respiratory tract. Formaldehyde vapor can also make contact with mucous membranes in the eyes, nose, or throat. Formaldehyde solutions may be absorbed through the skin during the application process of liquid hair straighteners. Solutions of formaldehyde can release formaldehyde gas at room temperature and heating such solutions can speed up this process. Exposure often occurs when heat is applied to the treatment, via blow drying and flat ironing.

Stylists and clients have reported acute health problems while using or after using certain hair smoothing treatments containing formaldehyde. Reported problems include nose-bleeds, burning eyes and throat, skin irritation and asthma attacks. Other symptoms related to formaldehyde exposure include watery eyes; runny nose; burning sensation or irritation in the eyes, nose, and throat; dry and sore throat; respiratory tract irritation; coughing; chest pain; shortness of breath; wheezing; loss of sense of smell; headaches; and fatigue.

=== Reproductive health and birth defects of the toxic trio ===
The presence of Formaldehyde, phthalates, and toluene (the toxic trio) in the work environment play a role in the risk of reproductive health effects for cosmetologists. Studies shows that there is a significant increase in premature birth and an increased risk of pregnancy disorders when hairdressers were compared to a referent group of teachers and salesclerks where the only occupational difference were exposure to the toxic trio. Hairdressers and cosmetologists have a slightly increased risk of having an infant with small gestational age. Reproductive disorders in relation to low birth weight were examined and found an increased risk of having infant with low birth weight; three of these studies showed a significant increase.

Case studies on toluene exposures have found increased incidences of urogenital, gastrointestinal, and cardiac anomalies among children of mothers who were exposed to organic solvents, such as toluene. Associations were found between pregnant women who inhaled Formaldehyde, phthalates, and toluene and adverse reproductive outcomes such as intrauterine growth retardation and premature delivery. Hairdressers report premature ovarian failure five times more frequently than women in non-cosmetologist occupations.

== Regulation of cosmetics in the U.S. ==
In the United States, the Federal Food, Drug, and Cosmetic Act (FD&C Act) defines cosmetics as “articles intended to be rubbed, poured, sprinkled, or sprayed on, introduced into, or otherwise applied to the human body…for cleansing, beautifying, promoting attractiveness, or altering appearance”. Products such as nail polish, hair coloring, straightening formulas, and shampoos fall under this definition of cosmetics. In the U.S., the FDA does not mandate premarket approval for cosmetic ingredients or products, with the exception of color. Additionally, the FDA is not legally responsible for cosmetic product or ingredient safety and does not have the authority to require manufactures to submit their safety data to the FDA. Instead, the cosmetic manufacturer is legally responsible for correctly labeling and producing their products with safe ingredients. U.S. cosmetic companies are also not required to register their product or ingredients with the FDA as registration is purely voluntary. The FDA cannot legally order a recall of cosmetic products in the U.S. even if they have been shown to have poor health outcomes. A product recall relies on the cosmetic manufacturer and is therefore completely voluntary.

In contrast, the European Union requires cosmetic products to undergo premarket safety testing and requires mandatory cosmetology product and ingredient registration. In general, the European Union approaches cosmetics and their production under the precautionary principle. The EU has banned 1,328 chemicals from use in cosmetics and does not permit animal testing for cosmetics.

=== OSHA requirements regarding formaldehyde ===
OSHA requires manufacturers, importers, and distributors to identify formaldehyde on any product that contains more than 0.1% formaldehyde (as a gas or in a solution), or if the product can release formaldehyde at concentrations greater than 0.1 parts per million (ppm). Safety data sheets (SDS) must also accompany the product and kept on premises with the product at all times. The SDS must explain why a chemical in the product is hazardous, how it is harmful, how workers can protect themselves, and what they should do in an emergency.

Salon owners and stylists are advised to look closely at the hair smoothing products they use (read product labels and SDS sheets) to see if they contain methylene glycol, formalin, methylene oxide, paraform, formic aldehyde, methanal, oxomethane, oxymethylene, or CAS Number 50-00-0. According to OSHA's Formaldehyde standard, a product containing any of these names should be treated as a product containing formaldehyde. OSHA's Hazard Communication standard (Right to Know) states that salon owners and other employers' must have a SDS for products containing hazardous chemicals. If salon owners or other employers decide to use products that contain or release formaldehyde they are required to follow the guidelines in OSHA's Formaldehyde standard.

The Occupational Safety and Health Act (OSHA), is responsible for inspections of worker health and safety. It is estimated 375,000 nail technicians work in nail salons in the United States. Yet in 2005, OSHA inspected only 18 nail salons because businesses are exempt from inspection if they have 10 employees or less. According to the Asian American Resource Workshop, Vietnamese nail salon workers hold 40% of nail technician licenses in the United States. "It's long hours, low hourly pay, and fierce competition from every corner of the block" and with such fierce competition between businesses, salaries are reduced even further. As a result, a majority of these immigrants are subject to low socioeconomic status; which subsequently reduces opportunity to be educated about the occupational chemicals they are exposed to in the workplace and reduces opportunity to seek health care if adverse health effects are experienced from chemical exposure.

== Cosmetology careers ==
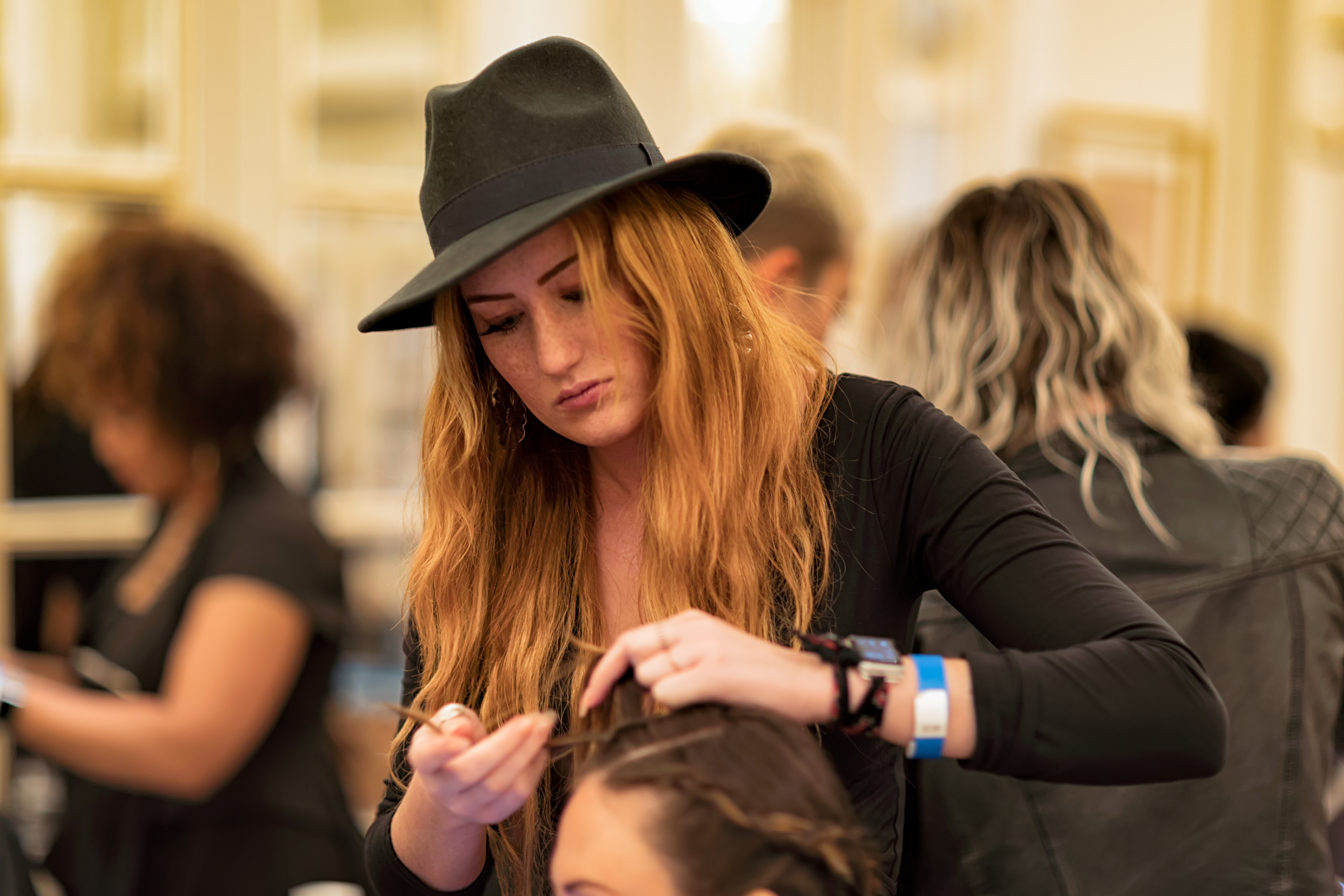
Hairstylists work outside of the everyday salon, as they are often hired for events, weddings, and film production. This image is a hairdresser working at Paris Fashion Week 2019.

In the United States, whether planning to study cosmetology or specialize in a specific area, each state has different requirements that must be fulfilled before obtaining a license.

For example, the State of Illinois Department of Financial and Professional Regulations requires each candidate to complete their hours through a licensed cosmetology school program where new skills are taught and learned such as hair coloring, styling, hair cutting and the usage of hazardous chemicals. After completing the minimum hours to obtain a state license, an online examination is required and is submitted via mail with other supported documentation. Bureau of Labor Statistics states that the median salary for a licensed cosmetologist is $28,770 as of May 2015. Illinois Metropolitan Division Areas, Chicago-Naperville-Arlington Heights has one of the highest employment rates with an annual rate of $27,750. Being a licensed cosmetologist opens the door to becoming self-employed and working at high-end salons. As a licensed cosmetologist, each has the option to choose which salon fits best to work in but a self-employed salon will bring more income as long as having the right business plan for it to succeed. Each candidate registering for a salon has to obtain a certificate of registration and present all required paperwork with the FEIN, Federal employer identification number to Illinois Department of Labor.

However, according to The New York Times, cosmetology schools are expensive and train students for low-paid jobs that do not allow students to pay back the debt. Iowa has the strictest requirements for a cosmetology degree: 2,100 hours of instruction. The Times interviewed over twenty former students. One typical student paid $21,000 for tuition and supplies at the Iowa School of Beauty. After getting her license in 2005, she was hired at a local Great Clips, at $9 an hour. Thirteen years after graduating, she owes more than $8,000 on her loans. In contrast, an Iowa emergency medical technician certification at a community college requires only 132 hours, according to the Times. Iowa is particularly expensive, but for-profit beauty schools across the U.S. charge an average of $17,000 for a cosmetology certificate. Community colleges would be cheaper, but when Iowa Central Community College applied to the state cosmetology board in 2004 to start a program, the Iowa Cosmetology School Association and Laʼ James International College sued, arguing that the state code prohibits public entities from competing with private entities. The community college agreed not to give certificate programs. According to The Times, the cosmetology schools have prevented efforts to lower the number of hours required for a certificate.

=== Notable cosmetologists ===
- Elizabeth Arden
- Kevyn Aucoin
- Tabatha Coffey
- Lino Carbosiero
- Ellis Faas
- Ruth Johns Ferguson
- John Frieda
- Marjorie Joyner
- Estée Lauder
- Annie Malone
- Anthony Mascolo
- Paul Mitchell
- Brad Mondo
- Alexander Ostroumov
- Karen Paba
- Leo Passage
- Helena Rubinstein
- Lydia Sarfati
- Vidal Sassoon
- Lee Stafford
- Amy Surginer Northrop
- Magdeleine Thenault Mondoloni
- Christine Valmy
- Jonathan Van Ness
- Madam C. J. Walker
- Florence E. Wall
- Tammy Wynette
