= Valmy (disambiguation) =

Valmy is a commune in the Marne department in north-eastern France.

Valmy may also refer to:

== People ==
- Valmy (name)

== Places ==
- Valmy, Nevada, unincorporated community in the United States
- Valmy, Wisconsin, unincorporated community in the United States

== Companies ==
- Valmy (company), a French manufacturer of medical supplies

== Other uses ==
- Battle of Valmy, battle of the French Revolutionary Wars
- French ship Valmy (1847), French ship of the line
