= Ostroumov =

Ostroumov (Russian: Остроумов; from ostryi um, meaning sharp intellect) is a Russian surname originated in clergy, derived from the words "blago-" ('good') +"-nrav" ('nature') and given to a clerical student as an epithet for his smartness. Its feminine counterpart is Ostroumova. The surname may refer to the following notable people:

- Alexander Ostroumov (1859–1920), Russian pharmaceutical chemist, perfume and cosmetics maker
- Alexander Ostroumov Bryner, Chinese-born Russian American retired lawyer and jurist
- Anna Ostroumova-Lebedeva (1871—1955), Russian artist
- Nikolai Ostroumov (1846–1930), Russian educationalist in Turkestan
- Sergey Ostroumov, Russian musician
- Olga Ostroumova (born 1947), Russian theater and film actress
