= Valmy (name) =

Valmy is both a surname and a given name. Notable people with the name include:

- André Valmy (1919–2015), French actor
- Christine Valmy (1926–2015), Romanian-American esthetician, consultant, and entrepreneur
- René Valmy (1920–1977), French sprinter
- Valmy Thomas (1925–2010), Puerto Rican baseball player
