= Florence E. Wall =

Cosmetic chemist

Florence Emeline Wall
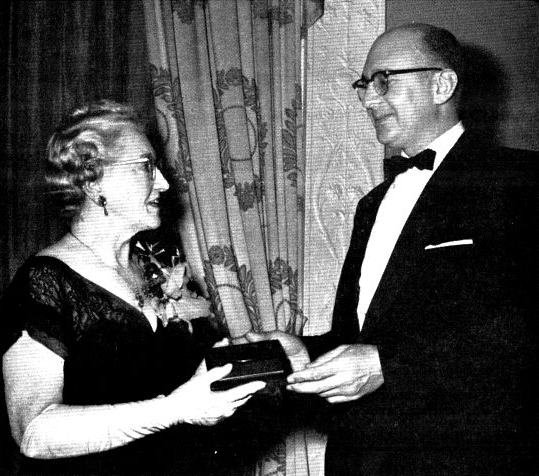
- Receiving the Society of Cosmetic Chemists Medal, 1956
- Born: 1893; Paterson, New Jersey, U.S.
- Died: October 2, 1988 (aged 95); Fairfield, Connecticut, U.S.
- Education: Hunter College, Columbia University
- Awards: Society of Cosmetic Chemists Medal
- Scientific career
- Fields: Cosmetic chemistry
- Workplaces: University of Pennsylvania

Florence Emeline Wall (1893 – October 2, 1988) was one of the first women to be recognized as a cosmetic chemist and the first woman to receive the medal of the Society of Cosmetic Chemists, in 1956. She was recognized then as "the foremost authority on this branch of education". She was inducted into the Cosmetology Hall of Fame at the New York World's Fair in 1965.

== Education ==
Wall graduated from St. Elizabeth's College in Convent Station, N.J., in 1913. She received bachelor's degrees in both Arts and Education, with honors in English and Chemistry. Initially a teacher, she was able to enter the chemical profession as men went to fight in World War I and women entered business and industry.

== Early career ==
Her first position, in 1917, was with the Radium Luminous Material Corporation of Orange, New Jersey. Luckily she was not one of the Radium Girls, workers who became ill from exposure to radioactive paints. Wall's job was to chemically analyse ores and measure the concentration of radium extracted from them. Her reports made clear that chemists at the plant routinely used protective laboratory equipment and procedures which were not utilized by dial painters. She later testified and wrote about her work at the plant.

Within a year, she had joined the Seydel Manufacturing Company, where she worked on the distillation of benzyl acetate and other benzoic acid derivatives. After examining a sample of her work, the U. S. Chemical Warfare Service asked her to supervise large-scale production of benzyl acetate and benzyl benzoate at the Fellows Medical Manufacturing Company, for coating military aircraft. After the plant closed at the end of the war, she worked briefly in 1919 for Ricketts Laboratory and then for the U. S. Motor Fuel Corporation on catalysts for gasoline. She was fired after reporting falsification of results at the plant and recommending that the pilot program there be terminated.

== Cosmetic chemistry ==
In 1923, she became one of the first women admitted as a Fellow of the American Institute of Chemists. After a brief period teaching in Cuba, Wall was hired by Inecto, Inc., a leading manufacturer of hair dyes, in 1924. Her original position was as a liaison between the development lab and the product testing salon. With strong technical and writing skills, and fluency in multiple languages, she was soon made the head of library research and technical advice. Eventually her title became "Director of trade education and technical publicity".

Florence E. Wall helped to found Inetco's Notox Institute for postgraduate education in hair dyeing in the 1920s, and developed curricula for beauty and cosmetology schools such as the Notox Institute and the Marinello Schools of Beauty, which were purchased by Inetco. She coined the term "canitics" when asked to write a text about the art and science of hair dyeing. Eventually Florence published 5 books, including Canitics: The Art and Science of Hair Dyeing, The Principles and Practice of Beauty Culture and a biography of chemist Charles Herty, and more than 300 articles on topics including the history of the cosmetics industry and the status of women chemists. She wrote articles for the Encyclopedia of Chemical Technology and the World Book Encyclopedia, and edited The Chemist for two years during 1929-1931.

She left Inetco as of December 1928 to work as a freelance lecturer, teacher and writer. She traveled for months in Europe, reaching out to chemists, physicians, lawyers, advertisers and merchandising people. Unable to find anyone to supervise her as a Ph.D. student, she took further classes at the School of Education at New York University, creating her own program of self-study in issues relating to cosmetology.

Marston L. Hamlin, an early employer, later said of her:

She has the admirable--but not too unusual--characteristics of intelligence, integrity and loyalty. But add to these restlessness, curiosity, ability to work untiringly, courage in entering new fields and a bit of Irish humor, and you have a unique human entity.

Beginning in 1936, Florence Wall taught the first college-accredited course on cosmetics, "Cosmetic Hygiene", at the School of Education at New York University. In 1938 she received her M.Sc. from New York University. She continued to teach until 1943, adding the specialized topics "Advanced Cosmetology" and "Teaching of Cosmetology," as well as a general class on "Teaching of Personal Grooming".

Wall promoted the idea that "Beauty is an Ensemble," involving makeup, hairstyling, weight control, posture, and general health.

Florence E. Wall was involved in the drafting of the Federal Food, Drug, and Cosmetic Act of 1938, testifying, attending all the hearings, and working with Senator Royal S. Copeland, who proposed the legislation.

In 1943, Wall became technical editor for General Aniline & Film Corporation, and moved to Easton, Pa. In 1945, she returned to New York as technical editor for the Ralph L. Evans Associates laboratories. By 1947, she had returned to freelance consulting.

== Recognition ==
She was a Fellow of the American Institute of Chemists, a member of the American Chemical Society (in the Paint and Varnish Division), the Society of Medical Jurisprudence, the Society of Cosmetic Chemists, and the History of Science Society. She was the first person to present a paper on cosmetics to the American Chemical Society. She was also active in the Women's Advertising Club of New York.

On December 13, 1956, she received the 9th Medal of the Society of Cosmetic Chemists, given as "our highest award for outstanding contributions to the science and art of cosmetics." She was the first woman to receive the medal.

She was inducted into the Cosmetology Hall of Fame at the New York World's Fair in 1965.
