= Marinello Schools of Beauty =

American private cosmetology school

- Type: For-profit
- Established: 1905
- Faculty: 260 as of May 2015
- Website: www.marinello.com

Marinello Schools of Beauty was a private, for-profit cosmetology school owned by B&H Education, Inc. with locations throughout the United States. It was shut down on February 5, 2016, by the U.S. Department of Education due to "pervasive and widespread misconduct that negatively affected all borrowers" who attended the school utilizing federal student aid. At that time, there were 56 locations throughout California, Connecticut, Kansas, Massachusetts, Nevada, and Utah.

Marinello provided students education and training in cosmetology, skin care, manicuring, barbering, hair design, massage therapy, advanced facial and body treatments, and master esthetics with laser certification, in addition to teacher training and short programs and workshops. The school was recognized by the Small Business Administration for its 60 percent graduate placement rate.

== History ==
Marinello Schools of Beauty was established in 1905 by Ruth Maurer in La Crosse WI. She started the schools to develop trained beauticians after she had developed a face cream in her kitchen that was distributed throughout Mexico, Canada, the United States, South America, England, Russia, South Africa, Australia, China and Japan. The schools were named after Giovanni Marinello, the founder of Modern Cosmetology.

Marinello's headquarters moved to New York in 1925, and then again to Los Angeles when the company was purchased by Scope Industries in 1963. Since March 2004, Marinello Schools of Beauty has been under the ownership of B&H Education, Inc., located in Beverly Hills, California. B&H Education, Inc. partnered with investment firms to purchase the company's remaining 13 campuses and acquire additional schools. Under their leadership, Marinello grew into a nationwide chain of beauty schools with 56 campuses in California, Connecticut, Kansas, Nevada, and Utah.

In 2015, Marinello Schools of Beauty had been under investigation due to stealing financial aid money from its students, which led to the closure of many of its schools. In February 2016, Marinello announced the closure of all 56 of its U.S. campuses.

On April 28, 2022, the U.S. Department of Education approved a $238 million dollar relief package to "tens of thousands of borrowers harmed by pervasive and widespread misconduct at Marinello Schools of Beauty". The department found the school "fail to teach its students" by not providing educators to students for long stretches of time between exams as well as using students as unpaid labor.

== Academics ==
Marinello provided the education and training necessary for students to pass the state licensing examination administered by their state board in order to obtain their license. In addition to the fundamental cosmetology skills taught, each program included a section on Health & Safety as well as Career Development.

Marinello was a private institution accredited by the National Accrediting Commission of Career Arts & Sciences (NACCAS). The NACCAS is listed by the U.S. Department of Education as a nationally recognized accrediting agency. Marinello also offered a $2,000 military scholarship to families of veterans at all campuses.

== Locations ==
The first Marinello Beauty School was opened by Ruth Maurer in 1905. The company headquarters moved to New York in 1925, but was relocated to Los Angeles in 1963 when Scope Industries purchased the school. As its closure, Marinello operated 56 facilities in California, Connecticut, Kansas, Nevada and Utah.

== Charitable Work ==
In 2011, the Marinello Schools of Beauty campus in Redding, California began participating in the Mannequin Head Recycling Project. Upon graduation, students donated mannequin heads, part of the 2,000 heads donated during the first year. All heads were re-manufactured as novelty figures, with proceeds going toward scholarship opportunities for students.

Marinello Schools of Beauty held an annual national competition to award talented high school seniors. The company announced winners for the Raw Talent Scholarship competition and gave away scholarships worth $10,000 and $5,000, and one-day professional beauty workshop sessions worth more than $1,000. Scholarships were awarded in Southern and Northern California, Utah, Nevada, Kansas and New England regions to winners who applied by writing an essay and participated in hands-on hairstyling or makeup application.

Students from Marinello Schools of Beauty in Paramount, California participated in a haircutting and makeup program for elderly residents across Southern California. On September 30, 2014, students cut hair, trimmed fingernails and gave makeovers on behalf of Volunteer Action for Aging.

Volunteers from the Marinello School of Beauty in Napa Valley, California volunteered to give haircuts and makeovers to the homeless in December 2014. Students cut hair for three hours at the Salvation Army Assistance Center.

The school participated in other charities as well, including makeovers for stressed college students at California State Polytechnic University, Pomona in Southern California. The school also participated in a Foster Care Youth Conference in Richmond, Virginia. The conference, put on by police, featured workshops to help foster kids think about the future.
