= Ruth Johns Ferguson =

American cosmetologist and entrepreneur

Ruth Elizabeth Booker Johns Ferguson (1902–1989) was an American cosmetologist and entrepreneur.

Ferguson was born in Salisbury, Maryland to a Methodist minister, Joseph E. A. Johns (b. 1868). The family moved to Philadelphia in the early 20th century, settling in Germantown, and she later married physician Emanuel Ralph Ferguson (1899-1985). Ferguson was a well known cosmetology expert and a successful Black business owner in mid-twentieth century Philadelphia.

Ferguson was a member of the National Beauty Culturists' League (NBCL), organized in 1919 in Philadelphia. As Tiffany M. Gill argues in Beauty Shop Politics: African American Women's Activism in the Beauty Industry, the NBCL was an incubator for Black women's leadership during the Jim Crow era. Ferguson also belonged to Theta Nu Sigma, which Cordelia Green Johnson, a wealthy Chicago real estate owner and president of the NBCL, started in 1946. Members of the sorority held bachelor's degrees granted by the National Institute of Cosmetology. Ferguson served as Theta Nu Sigma's president for a number of years.

In the 1940s Ferguson, along with her friend Naomi T. Fassett (1908-1983), opened a franchise of the Apex School of Beauty and Culture, one of the first beauty school for Black women in Philadelphia. In this sense, Ferguson could be said to follow in the footsteps of Madame C.J.Walker. The school, located at 525 S. Broad Street, operated for 35 years.

Ferguson's papers are held by the Pennsylvania Historical Society.
