= Karen Paba =

Venezuelan cosmetologist, entrepreneur and philanthropist

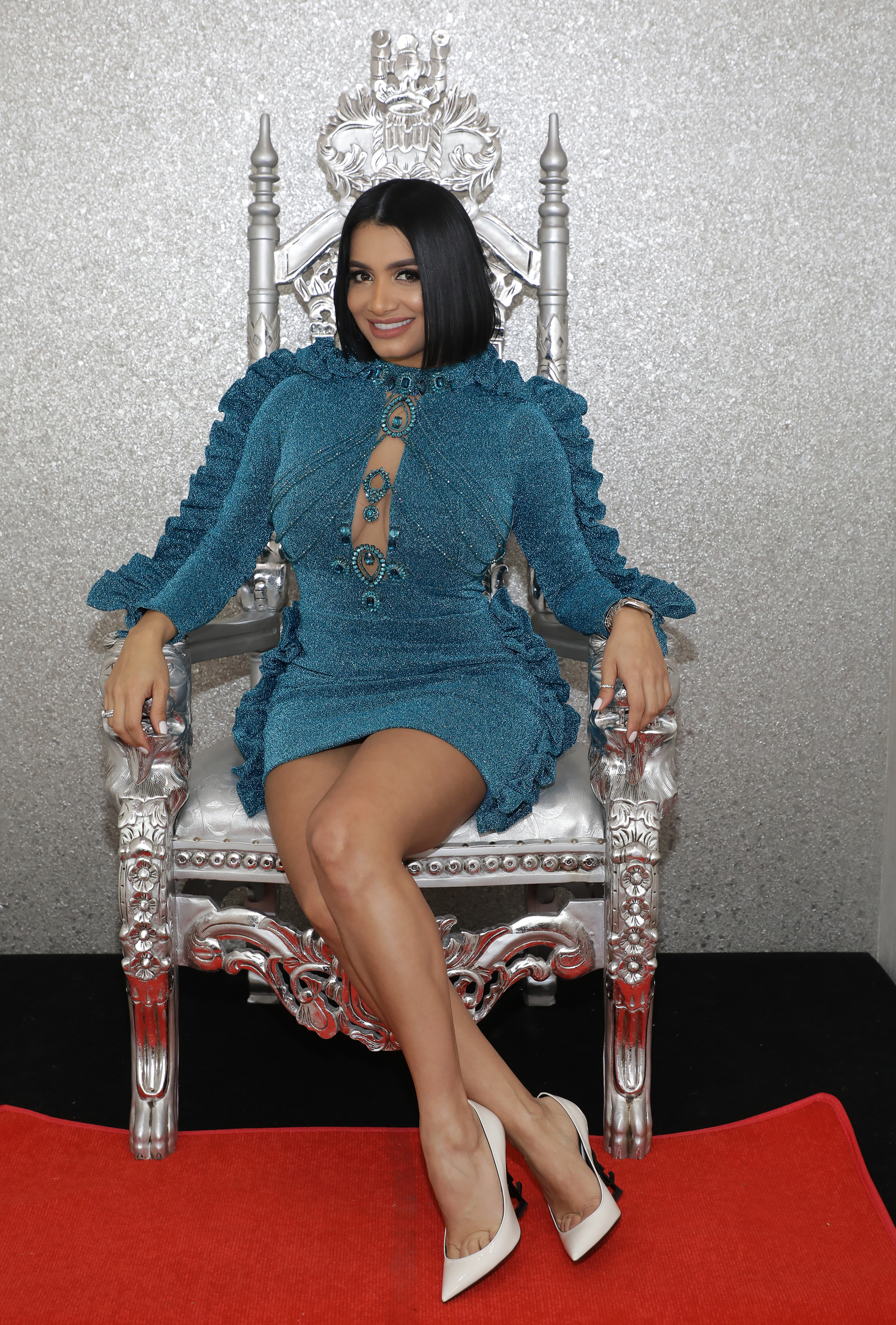
Karen Paba, photographed in Miami, FL January 2019

Karen Paba is a Venezuelan cosmetologist, entrepreneur and philanthropist whose work centers around eyebrows. She is known for hyperrealistic micropigmentation for which she created a custom technique for achieving prominent eyebrows. She has worked in the field of micropigmentation since 2014. In 2018, she launched an eyelash growth serum product called “Paba Lash”.

In 2017, Paba started a charity initiative called "Dono Mis Cejas" ("I Donate My Eyebrows") to offer her eyebrow restoration services free of charge to patients undergoing chemotherapy treatment.

Paba was born in Maracaibo, Venezuela, and moved to Florida in 2014. She has been working in the field of aesthetics since she was 19 years old. She owns an aesthetic studio in Miami, Florida.
