= Thalassotherapy =

Form of therapy using seawater

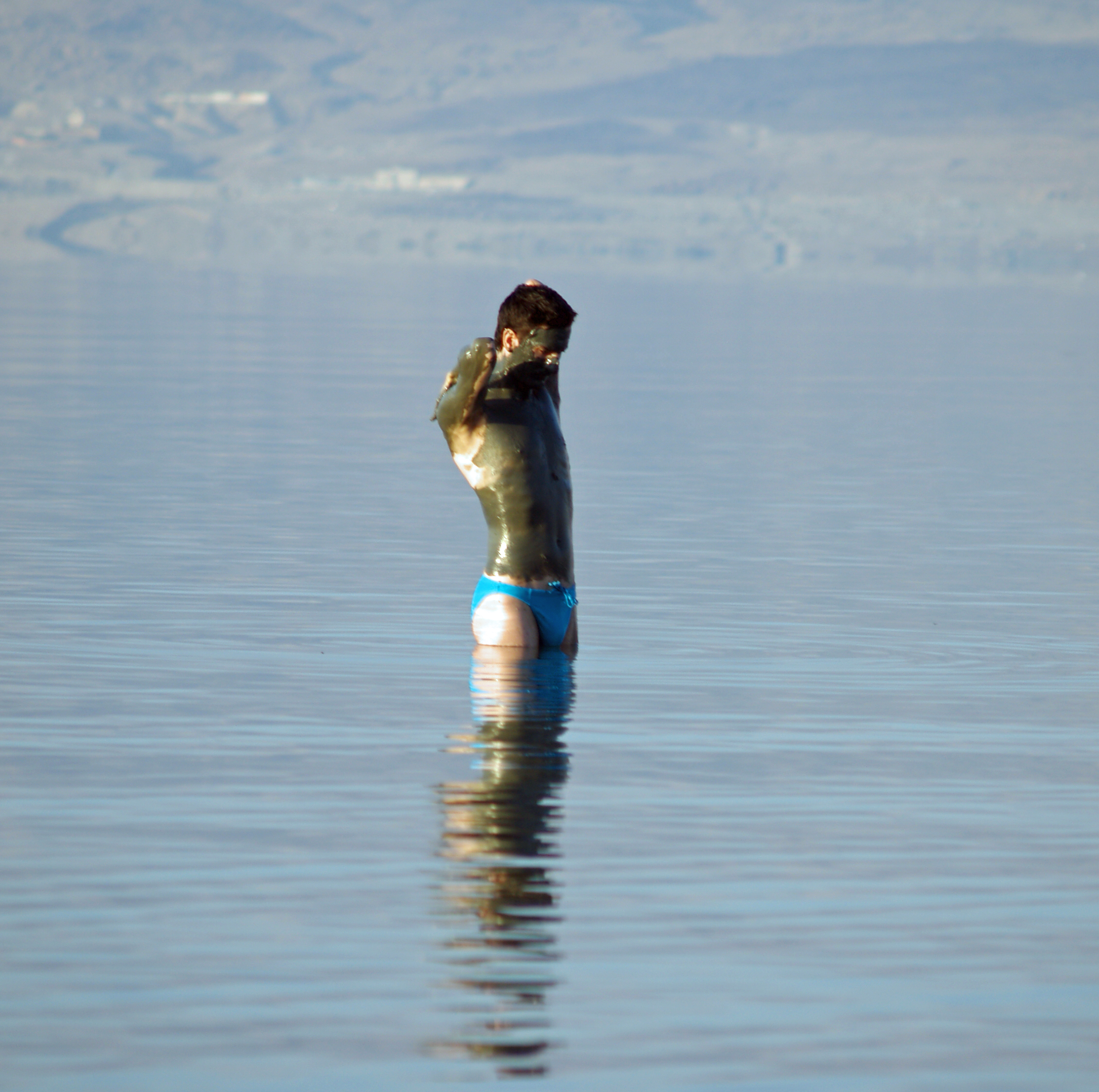
- A man wearing mud from the Dead Sea.
- MeSH: D013790

Thalassotherapy (from the Greek word thalassa, meaning "sea") is the use of seawater as a form of therapy. It also includes the systematic use of sea products and shore climate. There is no scientific evidence that thalassotherapy is effective.

== History ==
A particularly prominent practitioner was Dr. Richard Russell, whose efforts have been credited with playing a role in the populist "sea side mania of the second half of the eighteenth century", although broader social movements were also at play.

In the 19th century, heated saltwater public baths opened and became especially popular with higher classes. Others claim that the practice of thalassotherapy is older: "The origins of thermal baths and related treatments can be traced back to remote antiquity. Romans were firm believers in the virtues of thermalism and thalassotherapy".

== See also ==
- Balneotherapy, the medical use of bathing
- Halotherapy, the medical use of salts
- Water cure (therapy)
- Dead Sea
- Gurney's Seawater Spa and Thalasso Center, the only one of its kind in the continental US.
- Climatotherapy
- Lydia Sarfati, who introduced seaweed skin treatments to United States
