= Christine Valmy =

Romanian-American esthetician, consultant, and entrepreneur

- Born: Cristina Xantopol; October 25, 1926; Bucharest, Romania
- Died: January 18, 2015 (aged 88); Bucharest, Romania
- Occupations: Entrepreneur, consultant, esthetician
- Known for: Skin care, esthetics

Christine Valmy (October 25, 1926 – January 18, 2015) was a Romanian-American esthetician, consultant, and entrepreneur known as a pioneer in the fields of skin care and esthetics in the United States. Valmy founded the first esthetician school in the United States in 1965, and is widely credited as one of the most influential figures in modern aesthetics.

== Early life ==
Christine Valmy was born Cristina Xantopol in Bucharest, Romania, in 1926. She graduated from the law school of the University of Bucharest in 1946. During this period, she took a course in dermatology and skin care, which later formed the foundation of her career as an esthetician. In 1948, she opened her first salon in Bucharest, offering skin treatments based on traditional botanical remedies. To avoid the Communist pressures imposed by the Soviet Union, along with her mother and young daughter Marina, she emigrated to Greece in 1959. After working as the representative of a cosmetics company for Greece and Israel, Valmy and her family emigrated in the United States in 1960 penniless and unable to speak the language.

== Career in the United States ==
In New York City, Cristina Xantopol changed her name to Christine Valmy, inspired by the victory of the French over the Austrians during the French Revolution. After working in various places as an esthetician, she opened her own salon, but found teaching more rewarding. She persevered with her own techniques, now collectively known as the "Valmy method", with a philosophy to "reveal not to conceal" the natural beauty of a healthy, well-functioning skin.

In June 1966, Christine Valmy opened her first skin care school in New York. Her next step was to create an American association of skin care specialists (estheticians), an association which gained the respect of the international governing body of skin care professionals, CIDESCO. "Through her years", said the National Cosmetologists Association, "she has brought respectability and professionalism not only to the skin care and esthetics specialties but to cosmetology at large."

In 1975, after graduating with a master's degree from Boston University, her daughter Marina Valmy combined her knowledge of Chinese and Ayurvedic herbs, medicinal plants, oriental treatments and chemistry to create a laboratory where she could create all-natural products. The company's laboratory is in Pine Brook, New Jersey, where it develops, manufactures and warehouses its products.

In 1985, Christine Valmy was appointed by President Ronald Reagan to serve on the United States National Council on Vocational Education, in recognition of her contribution in the education field, and to assist in developing the country's policies on vocational education, in which capacity she served until 1991. "She is the originator of the skincare industry in this country, a fact that led the 92nd Congress of the United States to award her a citation fostering skin care as a profession in America".

In 1992, Marina Valmy became Director of the Christine Valmy International School in New York. The school is currently located at 1501 Broadway, in the heart of Times Square. She was also the Executive Vice President of Christine Valmy Inc.

Christine Valmy died in Bucharest on January 18, 2015.

== Books published, Awards and Civic activities ==
Christine Valmy is the author of three books on skin care and esthetics:

- Esthetics: The Keystone Guide to Skin Care
- Christine Valmys Skin Care and Make Up Book
- Christine Valmy Method of Scientific Facials

In April 1968, Christine Valmy was awarded a special merit honor by the French Congress of Aesthetics at Versailles, France for promoting the esthetics profession in the United States. She also won the outstanding Republican Ethnic Woman of the Year award in 1981. In 1976, President Gerald Ford nominated Christine Valmy as the Business Person of the Year for the State of New Jersey, where her second school and laboratories are located.

Valmy was a member of many boards of different groups. She was also a trustee of Famous People and People International, an organization founded by President Eisenhower to promote friendship and understanding in the world. She took part in the functions of the American Beauty Association (ABA), and acted as a chairperson of a politically active group of former Romanian immigrants, Concerned Romanian Immigrants for a Strong America.
