= Valmy SAS =

French manufacturer of Personal Protective Equipment

Valmy SAS is a French manufacturer of personal protective equipment, based near Lyon, France. Its products include surgical masks and disposable hygiene equipment. It is a subsidiary of Segetex.

In 2020, the company was involved in a controversy regarding the supply of protective masks to the United Kingdom during the COVID-19 pandemic.
