= Lydia Sarfati =

Polish-born American esthetician and entrepreneur

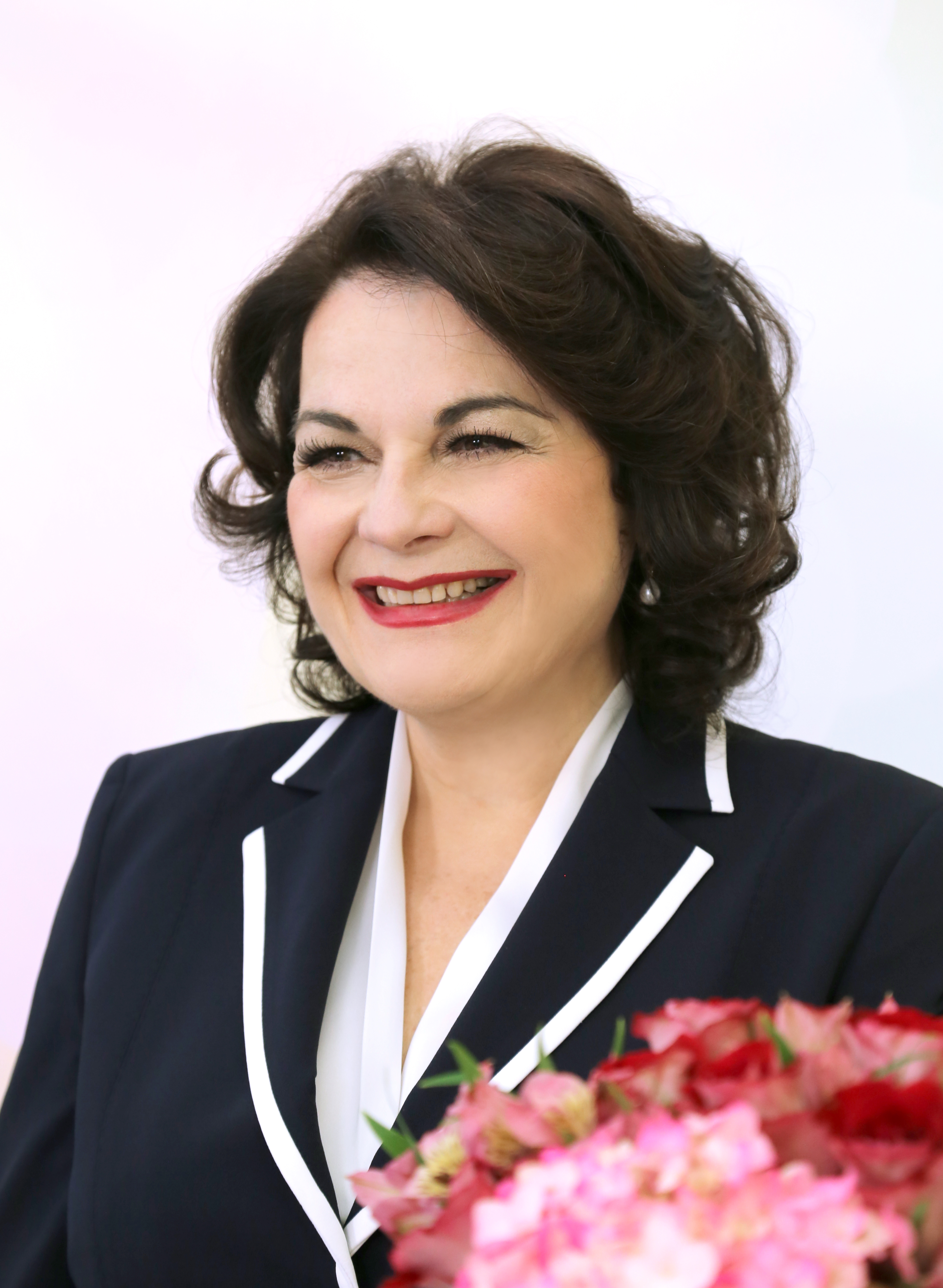
- Sarfati in 2016
- Born: Poland
- Occupation: Entrepreneur/Cosmetics Company Founder
- Known for: Cosmetics

Lydia Sarfati is a Polish-born American esthetician, entrepreneur, consultant and author. She is credited with having introduced seaweed-based skin treatments in the United States. In 1980, she founded the Sarkli-Repêchage, a seaweed-based cosmetics company, together with her husband David Sarfati. She is the author of several books on cosmetology and wellness.

== Early life ==
Lydia Sarfati was born in Poland. She is the daughter of Polish Jews Szloma and Sofia Mops, both of whom were survivors of the Holocaust. Sarfati grew up in Legnica; during her time in Poland, she took her first professional training, a medically oriented skin care course. Her family migrated to Italy, and in 1970, the family got the opportunity to leave for the United States, and settled in New York City, where she got her first job as a makeup artist in a salon on Madison Avenue.

In New York, she met her future husband, David Sarfati, and the two married in 1972. The couple had two children, and to support them, Lydia worked as an esthetician in Queens and, in the evenings, received private customers at the makeshift beauty salon she had improvised at her home.

== Career ==
Together with a friend, Shoshana Kliot, she opened a salon, the Klisar Skin Care Center, in September 1977. The popularity of the salon grew when magazines such as Vogue, Mademoiselle, Harper's Bazaar, and the New York Times Magazine wrote about Sarfati's esthetic services. In 1980, she introduced the Four Layer Facial and, today, her skincare method is taught in more than 200 schools around the world.

=== Repêchage ===
In 1983, she gave up on her successful salon business, and sold her share to her partner. She developed the Four-Layer Facial produced by the Repêchage company, which she founded together with her husband. The firm also manufactured cleaners, lotions, moisturizers and other skin care treatments. One of the most successful products was the full body treatment based on seaweed, the use of which Sarfati pioneered in the United States. Repêchage also popularized other ingredients used in thalassotherapy, such as sea water and salts.

Repêchage sells seaweed-based treatments and cosmetic products in over 45 countries. The company's headquarters are located in Secaucus, New Jersey, where Repêchage runs a 50,000 square foot, ISO 9001:2015 certified manufacturing, research, and development facility as well as a post-graduate esthetics academy.

== Other activities ==
Lydia Sarfati is a speaker and consultant for the spa industry. Sarfati published Success at your Fingertips, which covers all aspects involved in running a skin care business.
