= Ellis Faas =

Dutch make-up artist (1962–2020)

Ellis Faas (21 February 1962 – 12 August 2020) was a Dutch make-up artist.

Faas was born in Rijswijk. After her graduation from high-school, Faas did a professional course in photography, and always used herself as her model. In order to look different each and every time, she discovered the versatility of make up.

She decided to move from Amsterdam to Paris in order to study at Christian Chauveau's school for makeup. After this she went to London, where she found the creative jobs she was looking for. After the birth of her daughter, Faas moved back to Amsterdam where she was contacted by Inez van Lamsweerde. With her Faas made e.g. the awarded campaign for Louis Vuitton. Other work with Van Lamsweerde can now be seen in various museums.

Faas' international break-through came when Mario Testino was in the Netherlands to do a shoot for L’Uomo Vogue. In Ellis Faas’ portfolio he found the style of makeup he wanted, and this was the start of a fruitful collaboration. After Testino, the rest of the world followed, and since then she frequently worked with many photographers such as Miles Aldridge, Michelangelo Di Battista, Richard Burbridge, Patrick Demarchelier, Nathaniel Goldberg, Jean-Paul Goude, Karl Lagerfeld, Guido Mocafico, Jean-Baptiste Mondino, Tom Munro, Vincent Peters, Phil Poynter, Terry Richardson, Paolo Roversi and Sølve Sundsbø.

Besides photo shoots for magazines and advertising campaigns, Faas was also the leading makeup artist for fashion shows all around the globe, designing makeup for the shows for Giorgio Armani, Cacharel, Chanel, Dolce & Gabbana, Dries van Noten, Fendi, Jean-Paul Gaultier, Kenzo Takada, Moschino, Sonia Rykiel, Yves Saint-Laurent Haute Couture, Junko Shimada, Olivier Theyskens, Emanuel Ungaro, Viktor & Rolf, H&M and Junya Watanabe.

Ellis Faas worked mainly in Paris, New York and Milan, but officially lived in a studio in one of the oldest parts of Amsterdam.

She died on 13 August 2020 in Amsterdam.
