= Amy Surginer Northrop =

American businesswoman

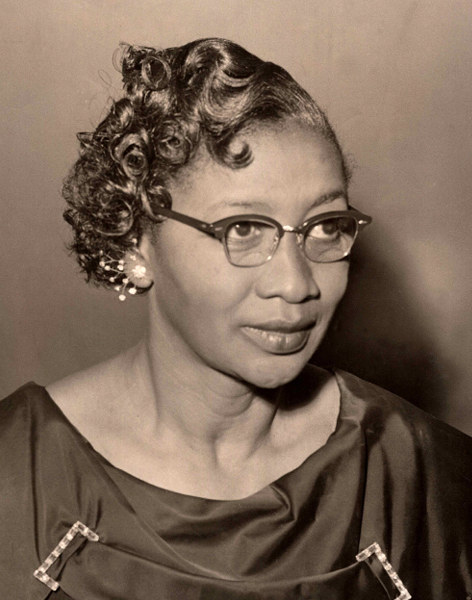
Amy Surginer Northrop

Amy Surginer Northrop (1905–2010) was an American cosmetologist, businessperson, entrepreneur, and activist.

== Early life ==
Surginer was born in Dixiana, West Columbia, South Carolina, in 1905. Northrop attended grade school in Dixiana, South Carolina, alongside St. Ann Episcopal School. She attended Allen University, where she obtained her bachelor's degree in business. After graduating, Northrop continued her education at the Manhattan Trade School. The Manhattan Trade School instilled values in women, equipping these women for successful job searches.

== Post graduation ==
After graduation, Northrop worked in beauty shops in Pennsylvania, New Jersey, and New York. She later moved back to Columbia, South Carolina, in 1935 to establish Amy's Beauty Shop. She hosted the first clinic for the South Carolina State Cosmetology Association in 1936. Two years later, in 1938, she became a charter member of the Columbia Citywide Cosmetology Association. As a charter member, she negotiated the affiliation of the Columbia Citywide Cosmetology Association with the National Beauty Culturist League in 1941. Northrop was also the first African American state inspector for South Carolina, assessing beauty shops. Along with developing, in 1982, the citywide cosmetology association.

== Public service ==
In 1943, Northrop fundraised for the Good Samaritan Waverly Hospital. She supported the meeting of the Southern Negro Youth Congress, featuring W.E.B. Du Bois, in 1946. She also founded the Gamma Epsilon Sorority in 1947, a chapter of the Alpha Chi Pi Omega Sorority. Of all of these contributions to her community, she also held a life membership in the NCNW, otherwise known as the National Council of Negro Women. She was married and developed a scholarship with her and her husband's name recognized at Allen University. Northrop was a constituent of Mount Pisgah AME Church

Northrop was a civil rights activist; in the 1950s-60s, she joined civil rights activist John H. McCray as a member of the South Carolina Progressive Democrats. In 1974, Amy Northrop was awarded the S.C. State Cosmetologist Association's Women of the Year. She was also inducted into the South Carolina Black Hall of Fame and honored by the Columbia mayor, being awarded a key to the city. In addition, she secured the purchase of the State Cosmetology Headquarters and the beauticians association building in the city. The honorable James Clyburn gave a tribute to Amy Surginer Northrop before the U.S. House of Representatives in 2005 for her 100th birthday. Amy Surginer Northrop died in 2010, aged 105. Family-related: after her passing in 2010, her niece and son are specified as alive.
