= Magdeleine Thenault Mondoloni =

- Born: Magdeleine Thenault; November 19, 1921; Brux, Vienne, France
- Died: March 31, 2016 (aged 94)
- Known for: Cosmetics
- Spouse: Joseph Mondoloni (divorced)
- Parent(s): Roger Thenault; Armandine Marquet Thenault

Magdeleine Thenault-Mondoloni (19 November 1921 - 31 March 2016) was a French cosmetologist, union organizer, and businesswoman. Once referred to as France's “First Lady of Estheticians,” Thenault-Mondoloni is known for her work professionalizing the field of beauty as well as her eponymous line of cosmetics, “Magdeleine Mondoloni.” She is the recipient of the National Order of Merit.

== Views ==
Thenault-Mondoloni pioneered a view of beauty that extended beyond the physical to focus on generosity of spirit and inner goodness. Her work for French beauticians followed a similar vein, arguing that beauticians served a vital role in society that reached beyond mere makeup tips and haircuts.

Thenault-Mondoloni worked to bring this French idea of beauty to the international community, creating seminars and workshops about the evolution of beauty in Germany, Greece, Italy, Spain, Portugal, Canada, United States, Senegal, Japan, China, Brazil, Morocco and Algeria.

Notably, she also worked extensively with the major Japanese company Festa Cosmetics, serving as a Technical Counselor to the company from 1992–2001 and becoming their Honorary President in 1995. She worked throughout to Japan to found beauty schools and institutes, including those named for her in Tokyo, Hiroshima, Taiwan and Shanghai.

During her term as President of the Federation of Aestheticians (INFA) in the 1960s and 1970s, Thenault-Mondoloni played a vital role in establishing vocational programs that provided professional certifications for beauticians in France. She also founded beauty schools, hair salons and institutes dedicated to the study of beauty.

== Recognition ==
For her work in unionizing and professionalizing the cosmetology profession, Thenault-Mondoloni was awarded the National Order of Merit in 2009.

== Professional Affiliations ==
- Academié de Paris, Counselor of Technical Education (1985–present)
- Honorary President, National Union of Beauty Schools (1991–present)
- President, National Confederation of Cosmetics and Perfume (2003–2008)

== Bibliography ==
- Elizabeth Sleeman (2001). The International Who's Who of Women 2002. Psychology Press. pp. 9–. ISBN 978-1-85743-122-3.
- Magdeleine Thenault-Mondoloni (1999). La beauté, ma compagne. Pont-Neuf. p. 570. ISBN 978-2-910351-19-9.
- Mondoloni, Magdeleine (2005), Maquillage mode d'emploi : La leçon de maquillage, Guides du vivre bien, ISBN 2862140635
