= Alexander Ostroumov =

Russian pharmaceutical chemist

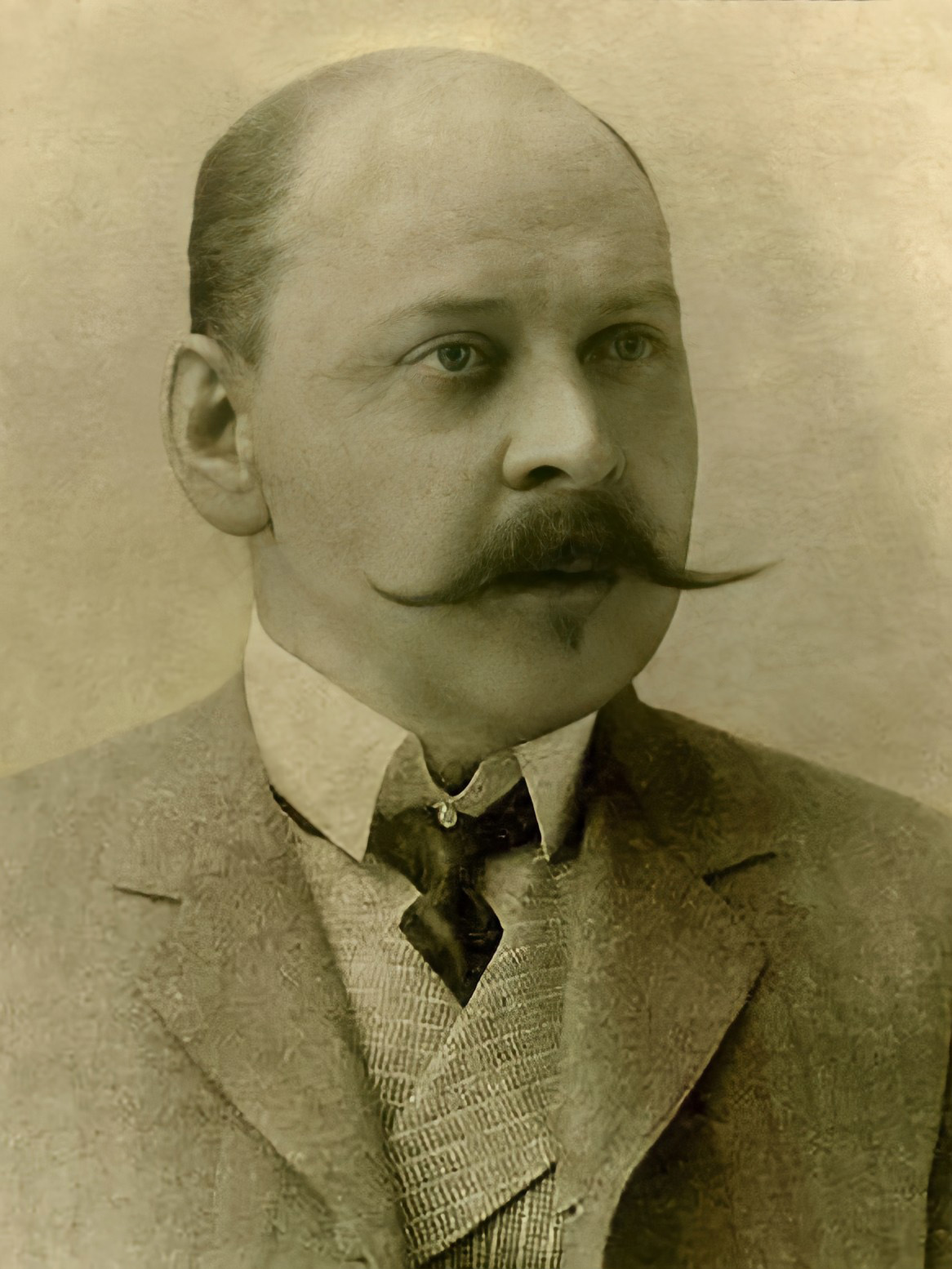
- Born: 1859, Moscow, Russian Empire
- Died: 1920, Constantinople, Turkey
- Occupations: Pharmacist, perfume and cosmetics maker
- Spouse: Olga Alexandrovna
- Children: Inna, Maria, Nikolay, Lidia, Olga

Alexander Mitrofanovich Ostroumov (Ostroumoff) (Russian: Александр Митрофанович Остроумов; 1859 in Moscow –1920 in Constantinople) born into a middle-class family, was a Russian pharmaceutical chemist, perfume and cosmetics maker. He invented the anti-dandruff soap, which enabled him to open his own perfume and medicinal cosmetics factory and was the founder of the Moscow Institute of Medical Cosmetics, the first of its kind in the world.

== Professional activity ==
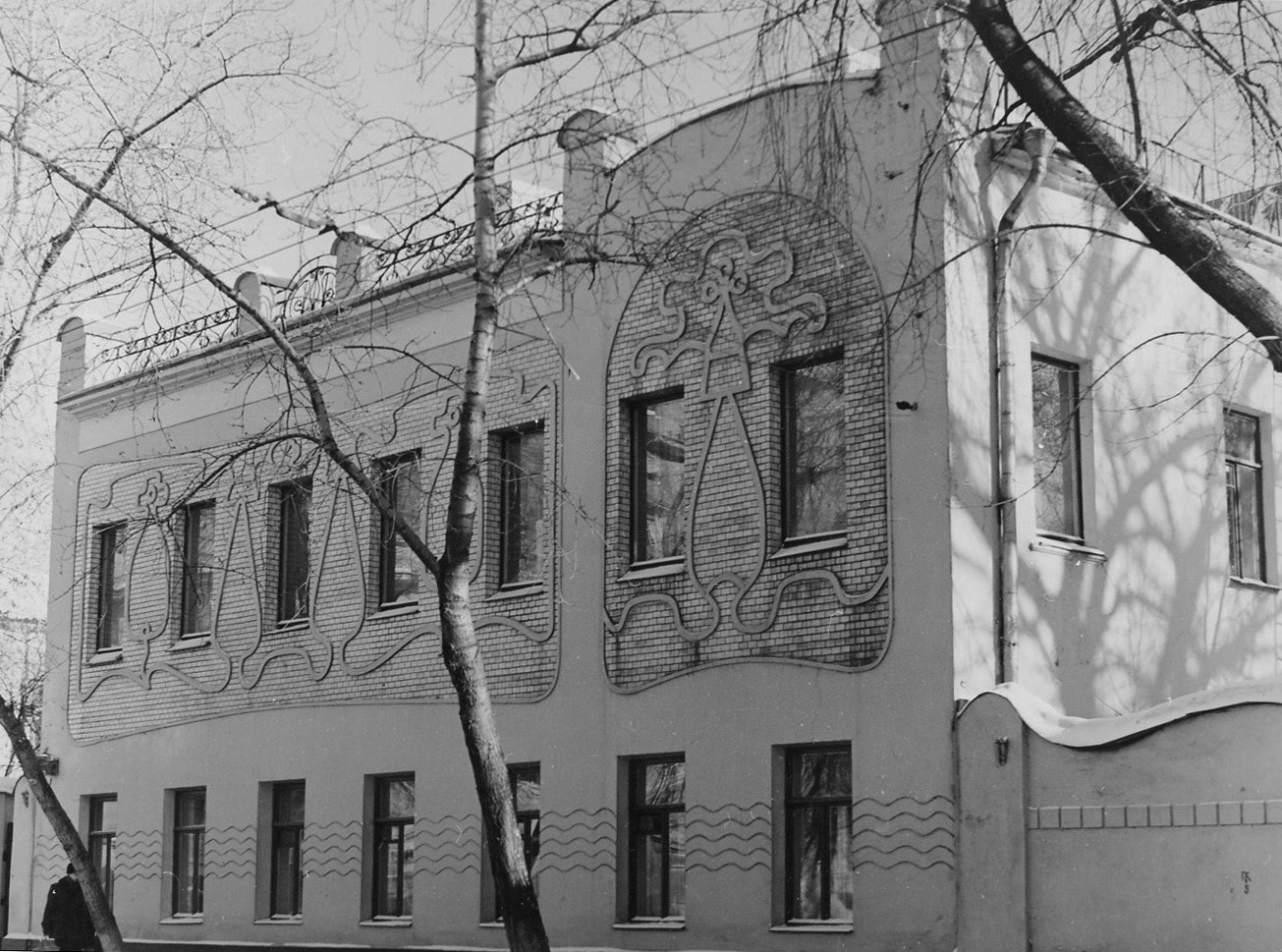
Laboratory House of A.M. Ostroumov, Tverskaya street No. 33, Moscow

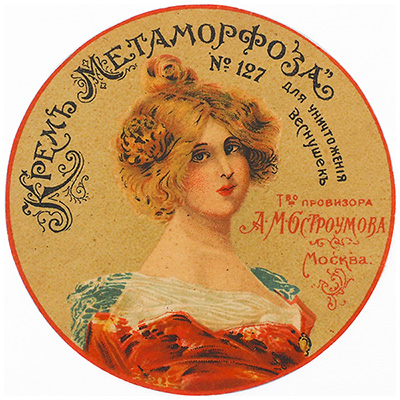
Label of "Matamorphosis Cream" by A.M. Ostroumov

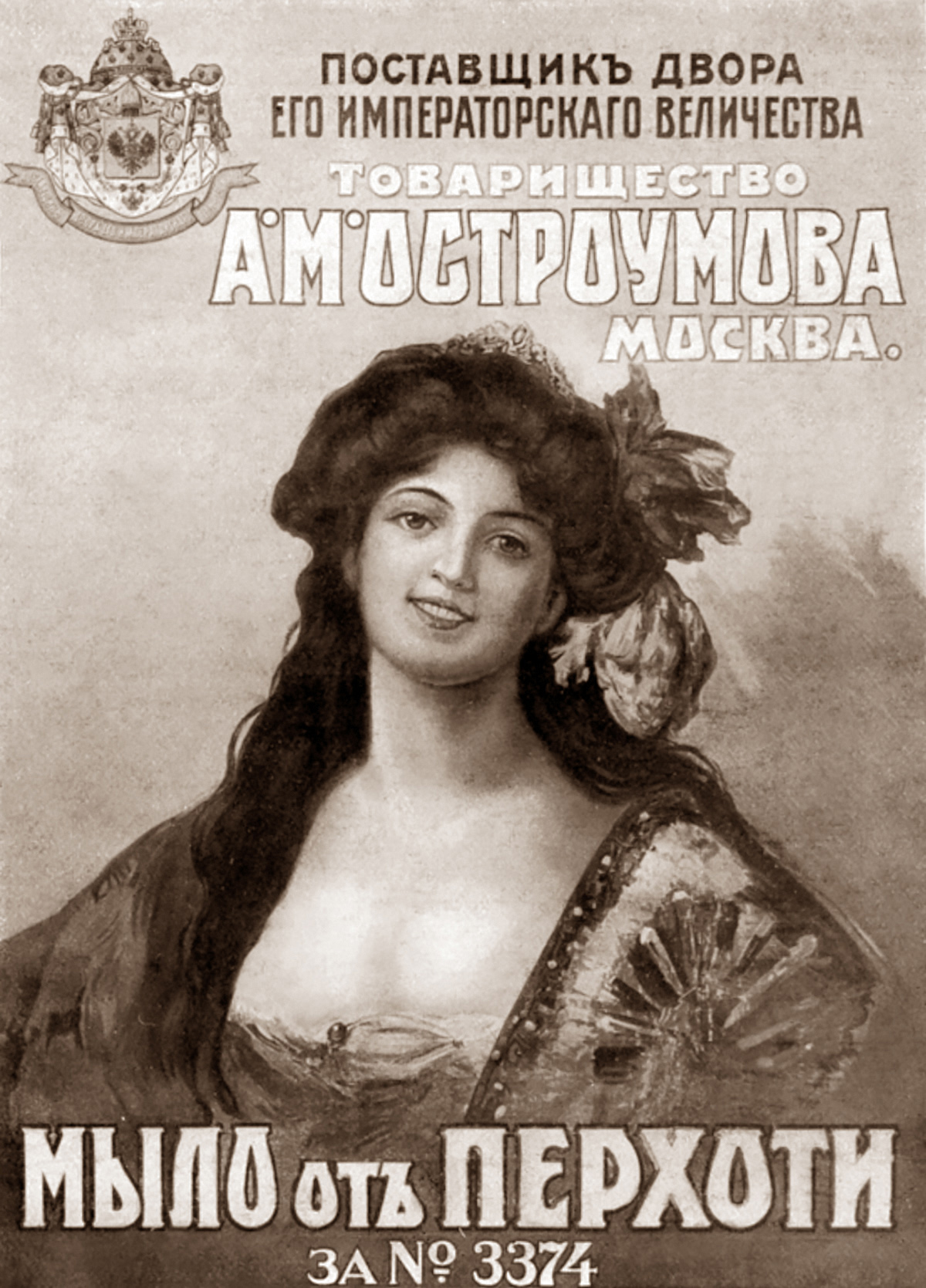
Label of "Anti Dandruff Soap" by A.M. Ostroumov

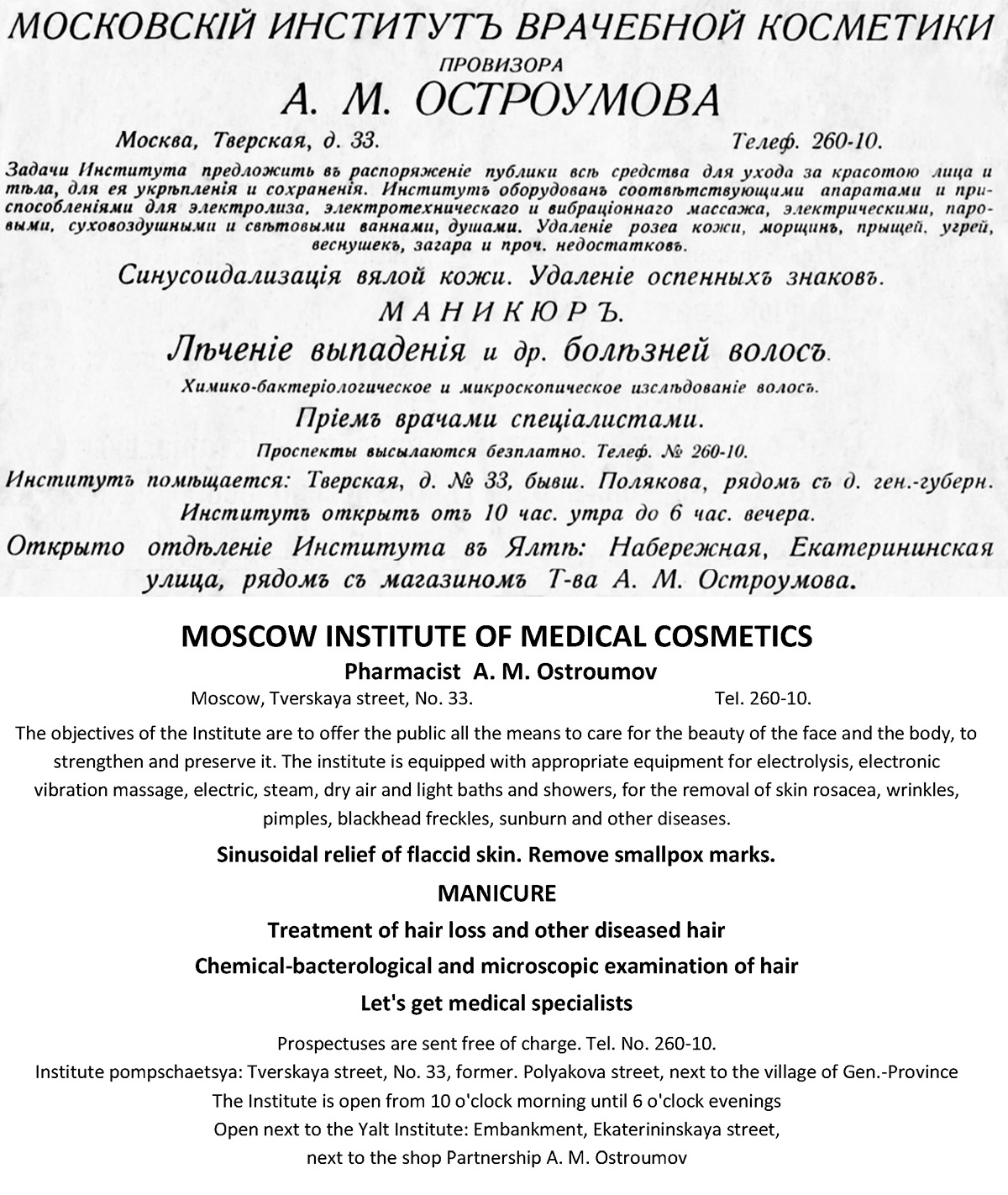
Advertising Poster "Moscow Institute of Medical Cosmetics Pharmacist A.M. Ostroumov", from about 1910, with translation from 2022

Ostroumov entered the business as an ordinary pharmaceutical chemist and referred to himself as such even at the peak of his career as the path to becoming a professional pharmacist was very difficult. Ostroumov worked as an apprentice for three years whilst completing a university degree in Moscow. Once he completed his degree he had to work in a pharmacy for three years before being admitted to a two-year degree at Moscow University, which, upon graduation, led to him becoming a full-fledged pharmaceutical chemist. After he creating the anti-dandruff soap in 1885, he invested in research and experimentation in order to create acne lotions, skin lightening products, and anti-aging creams. In 1900 the Perfume Factory Partnership of Pharmacist A. M. Ostroumov was established. Ostroumov, making use of advances in chemical and technological equipment, created the cream "Metamorphozis", designed to get rid of freckles, age spots and protect against severe sunburn, which quickly became the favorite of Russian beauties and brought him fame.

In 1909, Ostroumov established a laboratory on Tverskaya Street in Moscow, which grew into the Institute of Medical Cosmetics and him becoming the father of Russian cosmetology. In the Moscow Institute of Medical Cosmetics, Ostroumov worked on the prevention and treatment of skin and hair diseases where there were devices for electrolysis, electronic sinus vibration massage, steam, dry air and light baths and showers for sagging skin, rosacea removal, wrinkle, pimple, blackhead freckle treatment, sunburn and other disease treatments. From 1910, the institute also got a unique plastic surgery department.

== Marketing and advertising strategy ==
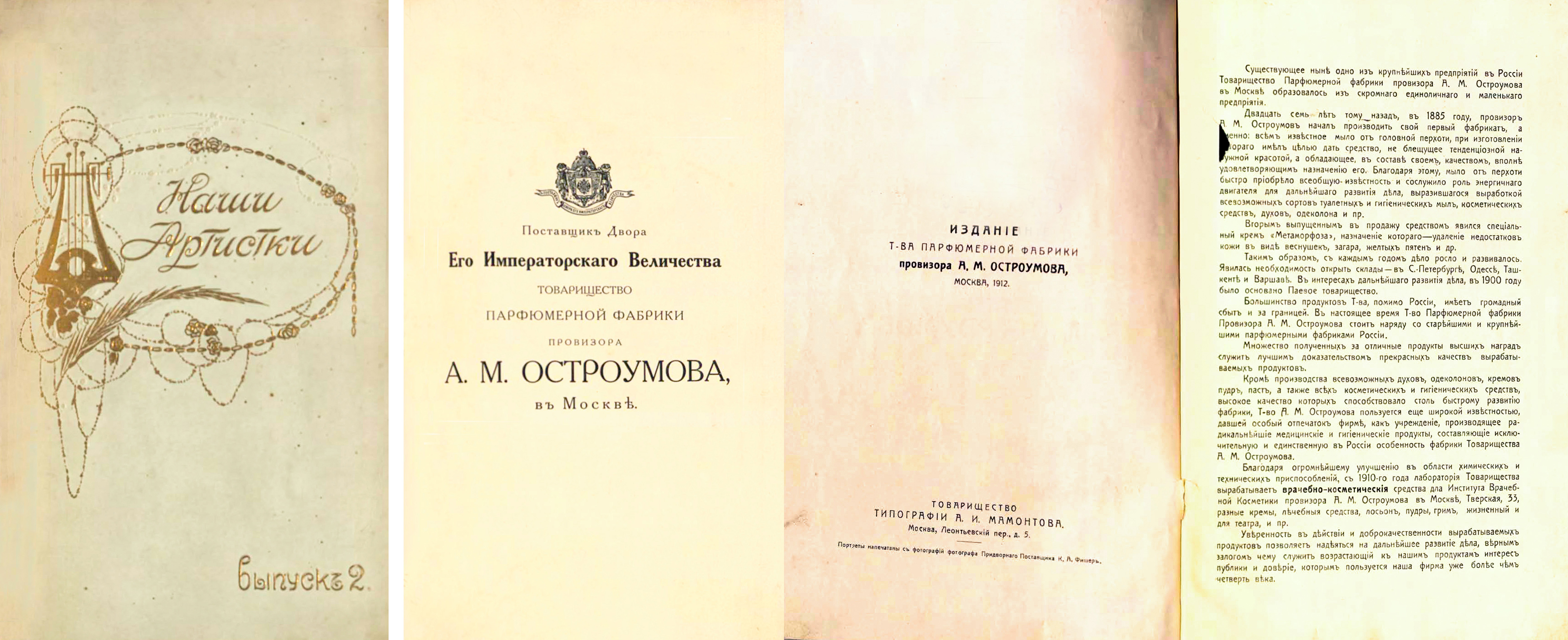
Illustrated book "Our Artists" by A.M. Ostroumov, purveyor to the court of His Imperial Majesty, 1912, Moscow

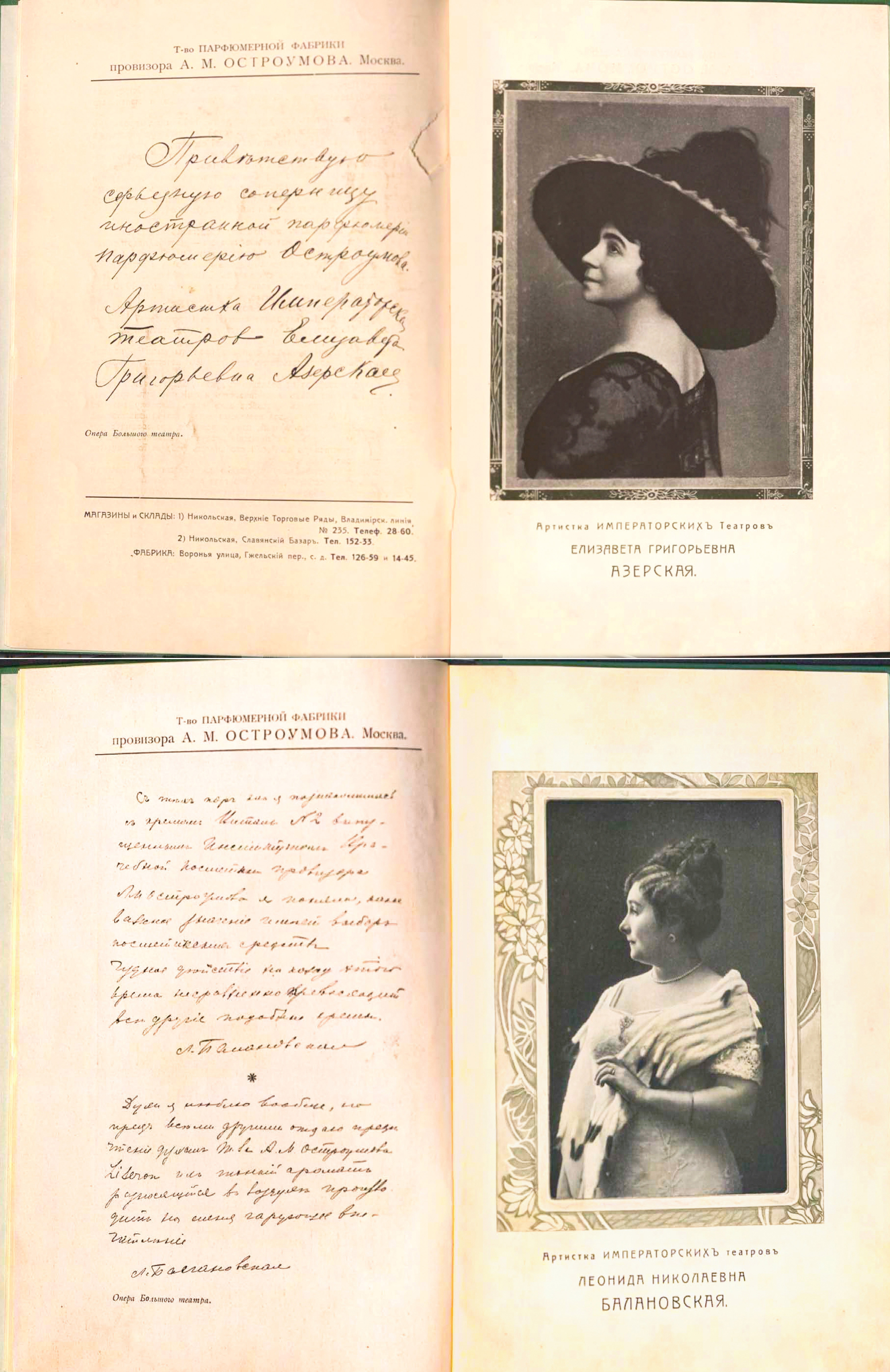
"Our Artists", pages of the soloists Elisaveta Azerskaya and Leonida Balanovskaya of Moscow's Bolshoi Theatre, with advertising photos and autographed notes of praise for Ostroumov products

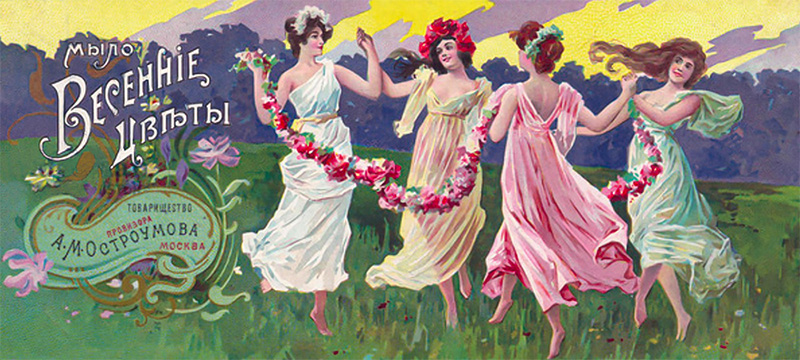
Label of "Spring Flowers Soap" by A.M. Ostroumov

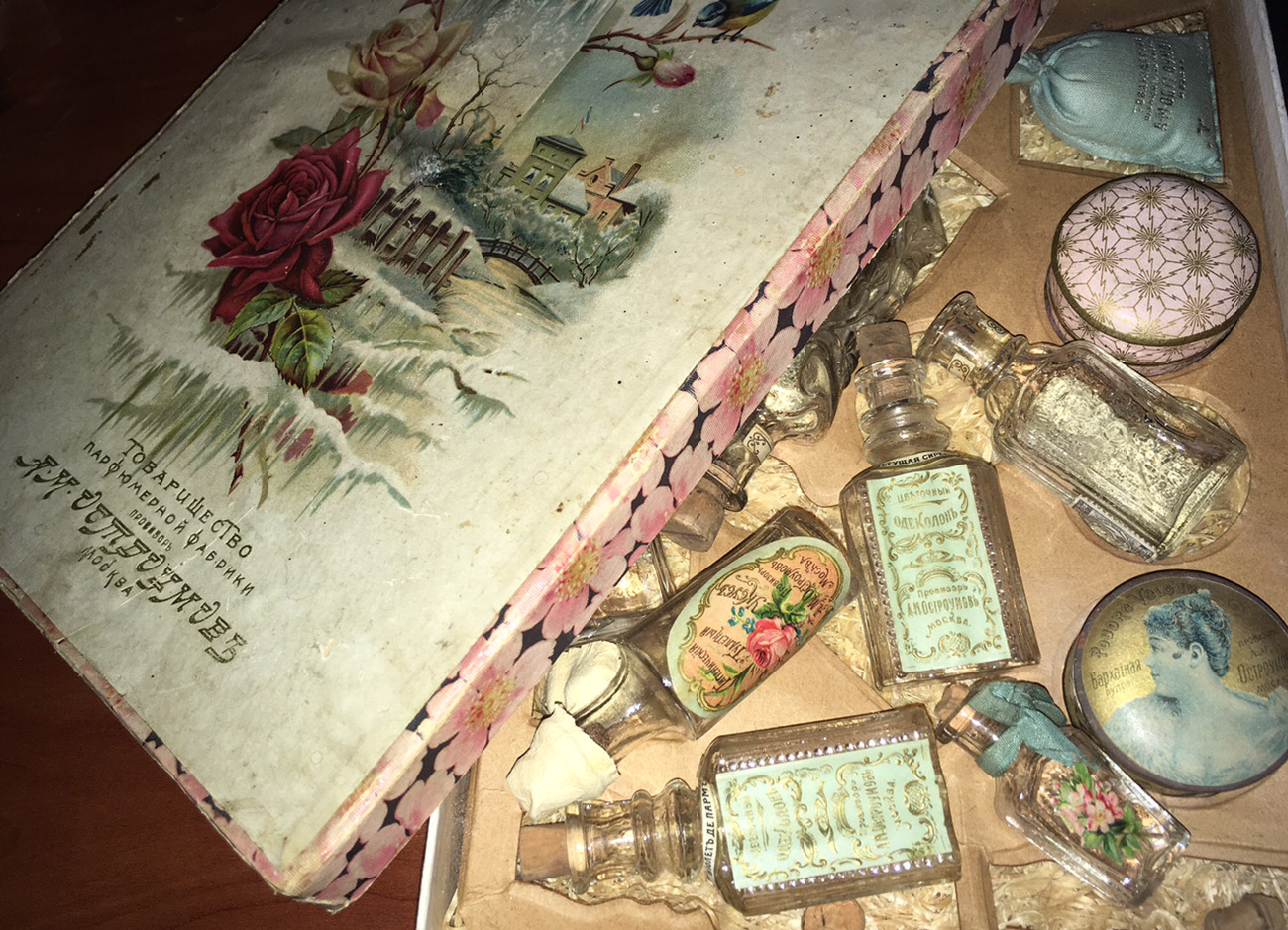
A small gift collection of perfumes, creams and other A.M. Ostroumov products

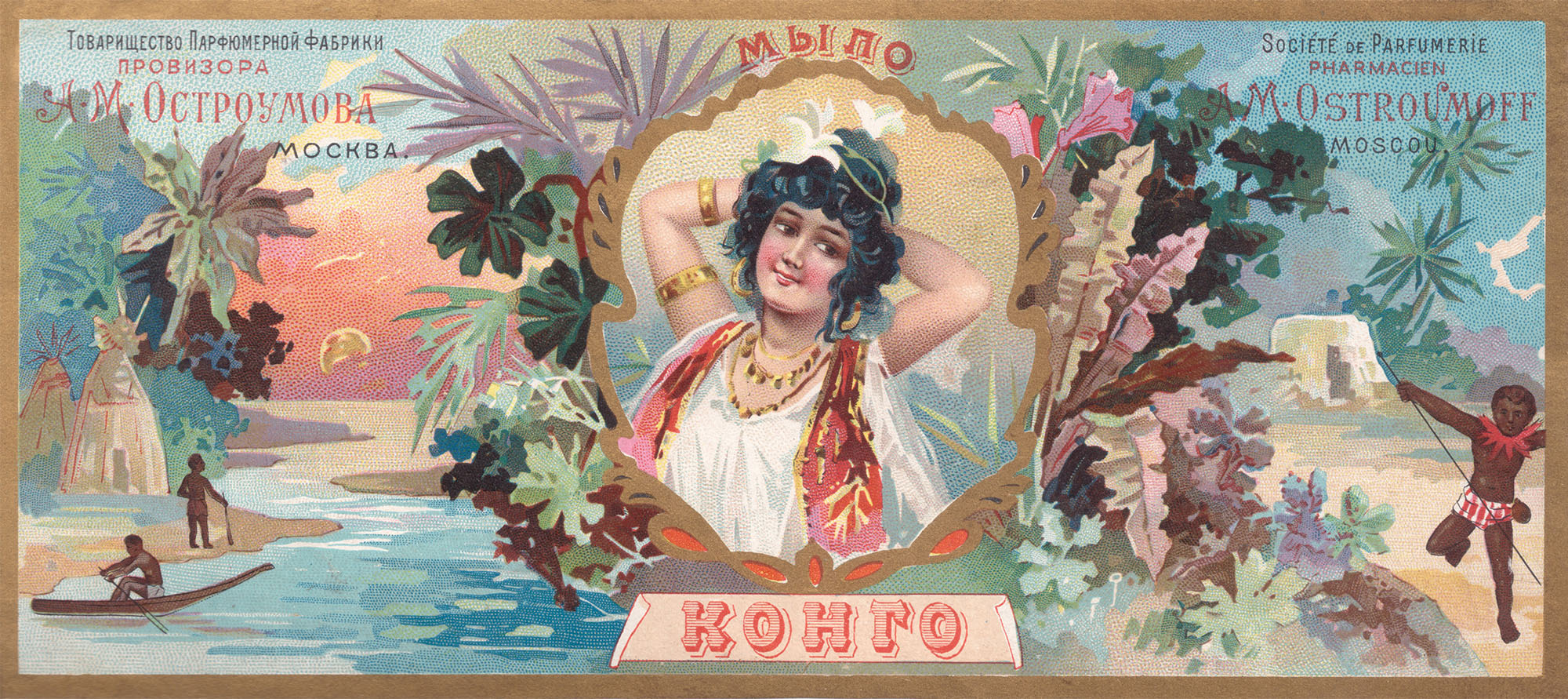
Label of "Kongo Soap" by A.M. Ostroumov

In 1912, the Moscow Institute of Medical Cosmetics A. M. Ostroumov published an album of promotional photos with autographed notes entitled "Our Artists" ("Nashi artistki"). The album was printed in 1912 at the A. I. Mamontov Printing House in Moscow and the artists photographs were taken by Karl A. Fischer, the photographer of the Russian Imperial House.

The Ostroumov company employed local stars for their "artists" which fitted in with their narrative of transformative beauty to gain an advantage over their foreign competitors. Among the artists featured was Elisaveta Azerskaya from the Bolshoi Theatre (before the October Revolution it was a part of the Imperial Theatres), who welcomed Ostroumov's perfumery, calling it a serious rival of foreign perfumeries. Wearing an elegant dress, dramatic soprano Leonida Balanovskaya issued the following statement: Since I have become familiar with chemist Ostroumov's 'Cream No.2', I have understood the importance of choosing the right cosmetics. The amazing effect of this cream on the skin is incomparably superior to all other creams. Raisa Reisen, actress from the Imperial Maly Theater in Moskow, jokingly wrote: If Napoleon had used Ostroumov's 'Napoleon' eau de toilette, Josephine would have never cheated on him. Some singers have been shown in character costumes reminiscent of the product names they are praising. Photographed as Cio-Cio-San from "Madame Butterfly" by Giacomo Puccini, the Zimin Opera soprano Vera Liutse opined: The unusually delicate and natural aroma of Ostroumov's 'Japanese Lilac'... reminds me of the native land of this flower, the land of the rising sun and flowers. Based on Liutse's image and text, "Japanese Lilac" alludes to Puccini's popular opera and heroine with the image of Liutse in the kimono of the foreign Cio-Cio-San providing a sense of the exotic. Other Ostroumov products shared the names of opera characters and were more directly associated with celebrities and their distinctive roles. Star Bolshoi soprano Antonina Nezhdanova, who appears as the heroine of the same name in Léo Delibes's opera "Lakmé", explained that she likes the perfumes of the Ostroumov company very much, especially the soap, cologne and powder 'Lakme'.

Ostroumov kept the recipes secret by splitting them into three parts with references to each other with each part kept in a different place. It was necessary to have all three parts in order to understand the full recipe and to be able to manufacture the product.

== Zenith and downfall ==
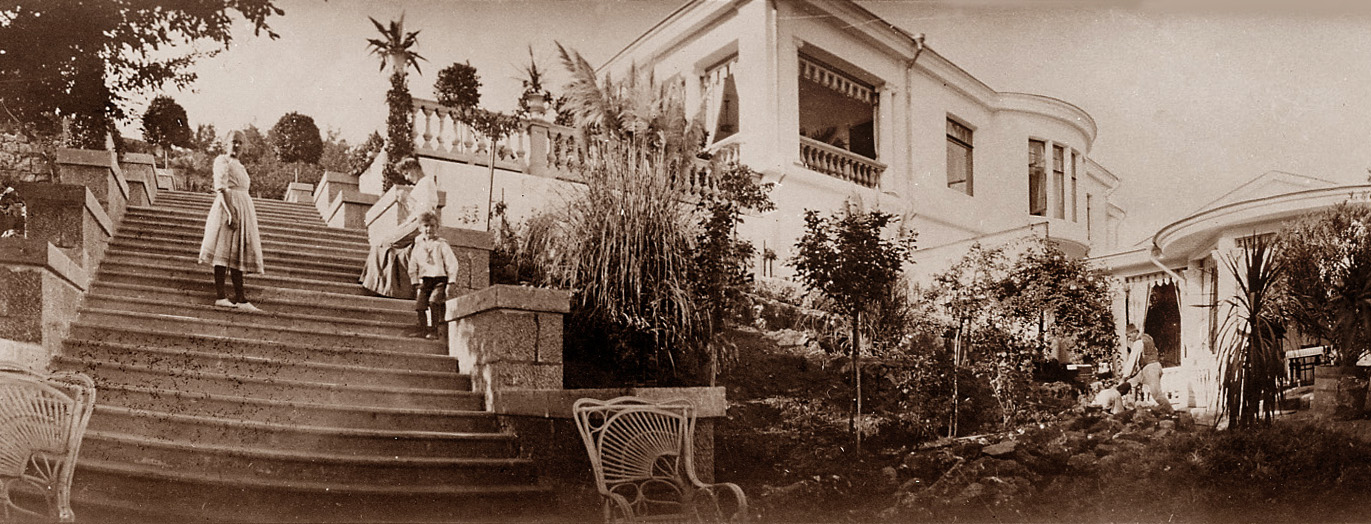
A.M. Ostroumov house in Yalta

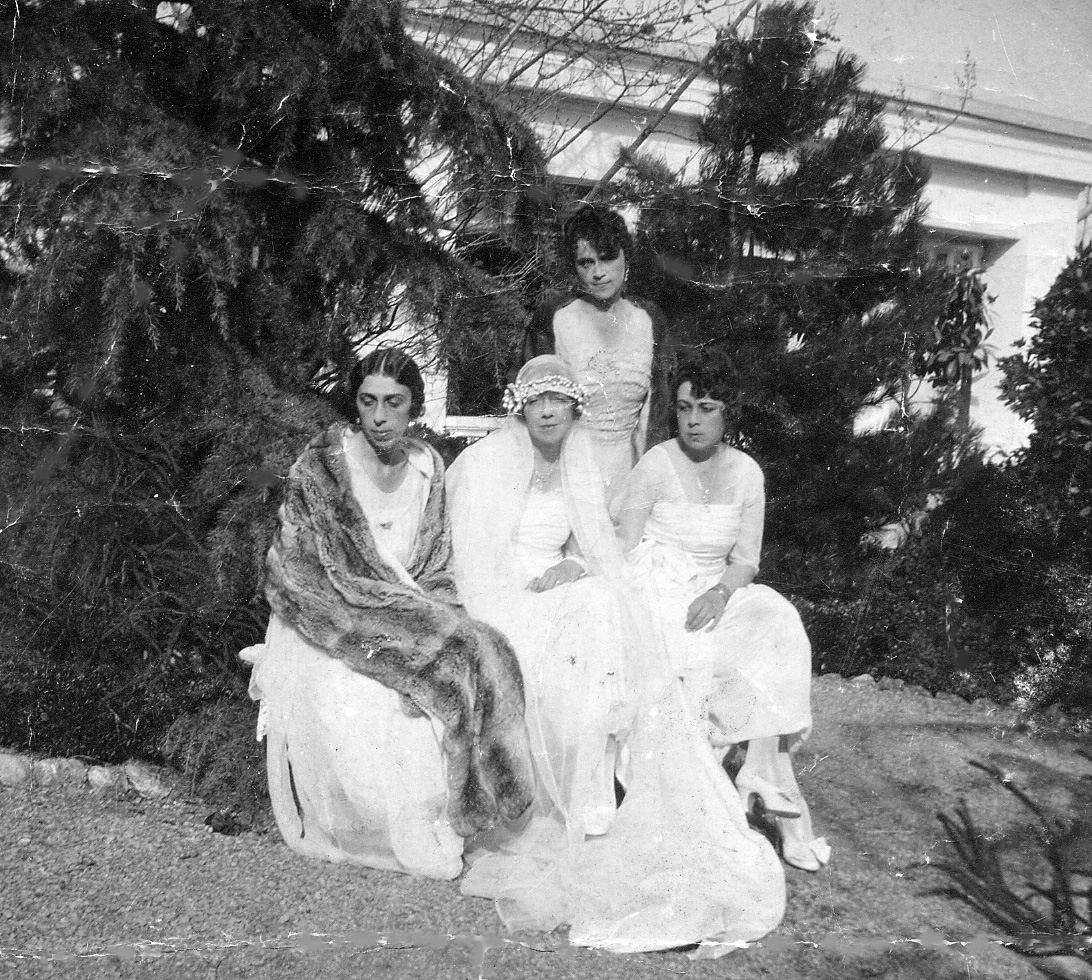
Alexander Ostroumov's daughters in Yalta, 1919: Inna (above), Maria, Olga, Lidia

The quality of the manufactured products was core to their appeal and helped A. M. Ostroumov to continue to grow which required new warehouses in Saint Petersburg, Odessa, Yalta, Tashkent and Warsaw as the partnership's products became widely sold and A. M. Ostroumov become purveyor to the court of the Russian imperial family which gave them the right to put the state seal on its products. Around 1912 his perfume factory was the largest Russian-owned perfume factory in Imperial Russia with a large variety of products from anti-dandruff soap and medical cosmetics to creams and perfumes. In the factory price list there are hundred names of eaux de toilette, including "Napoleon", "Chypre", "Lily of the Valley", "Jasmine", "Ideal", "Japanese Lilac", "Empress's Bouquet", "Artist's Cologne" or perfumes like "Fresh Hey", "Vera-Violet" and "Oridis".

After the Russian February Revolution, on 2 March 1917 [O.S. 15 March] the Russian Emperor Nicholas II abdicated and on 1 September 1917 [O.S. 14 September] the Russian Provisional Government, headed by the Social-Revolutionary Prime Minister Alexander Kerensky, proclaimed the Russian Republic. The business of the Ostroumov company was still going well but on 25 October 1917 [O.S. 7 November] the Bolsheviks seized power in Saint Petersburg.

Ostroumov's factory, like all Russian industries, was nationalized by decree on 28 June 1918 [O.S. 11 July]. In the summer of 1918, the entire Ostroumov family fled from the Civil War and the Bolsheviks to their own home in Yalta. In 1920, when the front of the Civil War reached Crimea, Ostroumov fled to Constantinople with his youngest daughter Olga and her husband Nikolai Baron von Stempel where he died of a heart attack shortly afterwards. His body was returned to Crimea and buried in Yalta. After nationalization, after the establishment of the Soviet Union, the company continued to function for several decades under the new name "Dawn". The production of "Metamorphosis" cream lasted until the 1960s, when the company closed.

== General sources ==
- Kozharinov, Veniamin (1998). Russkai︠a︡ parfi︠u︡merii︠a︡ : XIX-nachalo XX veka = Russian perfumery : 19th and early 20th century. Moskva: Sov. sport. ISBN 5-85009-465-2. OCLC 39077170.
- Fishzon, Anna (2012). Fandom, authenticity, and opera : mad acts and letter scenes in fin-de-siècle Russia. Basingstoke. ISBN 978-1-137-02345-2. OCLC 859336143.
- Ostroumov, Alexander, Our Artists (Nashi Artistki), Moscow: Typography Partnership A. I. Mamontov, 1912
- Olga A. Baronin von Stempel (youngest daughter of A. M. Ostroumov): Memoirs, unpublished manuscript kept in family archive Rascanu - Ostroumov, Mühlheim / Main, Germany
- Kolonit︠s︡kiĭ, B. I. (2021). Comrade Kerensky : the revolution against the monarchy and the formation of the cult of 'the leader of the people' (March-June 1917). A. L. Tait. Cambridge. ISBN 978-1-5095-3364-0. OCLC 1156422683.
- Bullock, David (2008). The Russian Civil War 1918–22. Oxford: Osprey Publishing. ISBN 978-1-84603-271-4. Archived from the original on 28 July 2020.
- Kenez, Peter (1977). Civil War in South Russia, 1919–1920: The Defeat of the Whites. Berkeley: University of California Press. ISBN 978-0520033467.
- Koenen, Gerd (2017). Die Farbe Rot Ursprünge und Geschichte des Kommunismus. C.H. Beck Verlag. München. ISBN 978-3-406-71426-9. OCLC 982380546.
