= World record progression 50 yards freestyle =

The world record in the men's 50 yards freestyle is not an official record ratified by World Aquatics (previously FINA), which only recognizes records set in meters. Practically, the unofficial world record is now limited today to swimmers competing in the United States, as short course races in yards are only currently used for record keeping in the United States.

The list of United States records in swimming includes records in short course yards, including the "USA record", meaning the fastest time by an American swimmer, and the "US Open record", meaning the fastest time within the United States. The vast majority of records in the 50 yard freestyle in the past 80 years have been set at U.S. collegiate competition.

For the earliest records on this list, from the late 19th and early 20th century, it is not uncommon to see inconsistent news reporting about whether a recent time was a world record, and what the prior record was. Interim records between those records reported in this list may exist and merit addition if supported by reliable sources. By the time Duke Kahanamoku swam 22.6 in 1923, the level of certainty in the progression of this list improves.

== Mens 50 yard swim, one turn ==
#	Time	Name	Nationality	Date	Meet	Location	Ref
-	28.2	James Tyers	United Kingdom	July 1895	Warrington	Warrington, United Kingdom	
-	27.4	James Tyers	United Kingdom	29 August 1896	Warrington	Warrington, United Kingdom	
-	26.4	John Derbyshire	United Kingdom	20 August 1898	Exeter	Exeter, United Kingdom	
-	25.0	Alick Wickham	Solomon Islands	9 January 1902	East Sydney Club Carnival	Sydney, Australia	
-	24.6	Alick Wickham	Solomon Islands	26 March 1904	Public Schools Carnival	Sydney, Australia	
-	24.2	Lewis Tod Solomons	Australia	12 February 1910	Lavender Bay	Sydney, Australia	
-	23.6	Alick Wickham	Solomon Islands	19 February 1910	Australia	Sydney, Australia	
-	23.4	Duke Kahanamoku	United States	6 August 1913	San Francisco	San Francisco, United States	
-	23.0	Duke Kahanamoku	United States	1917	Honolulu	Honolulu, United States	
-	22.6	Duke Kahanamoku	United States	6 June 1923	Los Angeles	Los Angeles, United States	
	22.1	Henry Kozlowski	United States	27 March 1943	1943 NCAA swimming and diving championships (broke 20 year old record)	Columbus, Ohio, United States	
	21.9	Dick Cleveland	United States	6 February 1954	AAU Ohio Swim Championship	Columbus, Ohio, United States	
	21.4	Steve Jackman	United States	3 March 1961	Big 10 Swimming Championships	United States	
	21.3	Steve Jackman	United States	30 March 1962	1962 NCAA Swimming and Diving Championships	United States	
	21.1	Steve Jackman	United States	30 March 1962 (later same day)	1962 NCAA Swimming and Diving Championships	United States	
	21.0	Steve Jackman	United States	7 March 1963	Big 10 Swimming Championships	United States	
	20.9	Steve Clark	United States	26 March 1964	1964 NCAA Championships	New Haven, United States	
	20.81	Dan Frawley	United States	27 March 1969	1969 NCAA University Division Swimming and Diving Championships	Bloomington, Indiana, United States	
	20.7	Dan Frawley	United States	March 1969	Bloomington, Indiana, United States		
	20.5	David Edgar	United States	17 January 1970	Meet at U.S. Naval Academy	Annapolis, United States	
	20.4	David Edgar	United States		United States		
	20.23	David Edgar	United States	4 March 1971	SEC Championships	Tuscaloosa, United States	
	20.06	John Trembley	United States	28 March 1974	1974 NCAA Division I Swimming and Diving Championships	Long Beach, California, United States	
	19.70	Joe Bottom	United States	24 March 1977	1977 NCAA Division I Swimming and Diving Championships	Cleveland, United States	
	19.36	Robin Leamy	United States	26 March 1981	1981 NCAA Division I Swimming and Diving Championships	Austin, Texas, United States	
	19.32	Matt Biondi	United States	28 March 1985	1985 NCAA Division I Men's Swimming and Diving Championships	Austin, Texas, United States	
	19.24	Tom Jager	United States	28 March 1985 (later same day)	1985 NCAA Division I Men's Swimming and Diving Championships	Austin, Texas, United States	
	19.22	Matt Biondi	United States	4 April 1986	1986 NCAA Division I men's swimming and diving championships	Indianapolis, United States	
	19.16	Matt Biondi	United States	2 April 1987	1987 NCAA Division I men's swimming and diving championships	Austin, Texas, United States	
	19.15	Matt Biondi	United States	2 April 1987 (later same day)	1987 NCAA Division I men's swimming and diving championships	Austin, Texas, United States	
	19.05	Tom Jager	United States	23 March 1990	United States Short Course National Championships	Nashville, United States	
	18.74	Frédérick Bousquet	France	24 March 2005	2005 NCAA Division I Men's Swimming and Diving Championships	Minneapolis, United States	
	18.69	Cesar Cielo	Brazil	15 March 2007	2007 NCAA Division I Men's Swimming and Diving Championships	Minneapolis, United States	
	18.47	Cesar Cielo	Brazil	27 March 2008	2008 NCAA Division I Men's Swimming and Diving Championships	Seattle, United States	
	18.39	Caeleb Dressel	United States	17 February 2016	2016 SEC Swimming & Diving Championships	Columbia, Missouri, United States	
	18.23	Caeleb Dressel	United States	17 February 2016 (later same day)	2016 SEC Swimming & Diving Championships	Columbia, Missouri, United States	
	18.20	Caeleb Dressel	United States	24 March 2016	2016 NCAA Division I Men's Swimming and Diving Championships	Atlanta, United States	
	18.11	Caeleb Dressel	United States	22 March 2018	2018 NCAA Division I Men's Swimming and Diving Championships	Minneapolis, United States	
	17.81	Caeleb Dressel	United States	22 March 2018 (later same day)	2018 NCAA Division I Men's Swimming and Diving Championships	Minneapolis, United States	
	17.63	Caeleb Dressel	United States	22 March 2018 (later same day)	2018 NCAA Division I Men's Swimming and Diving Championships	Minneapolis, United States	

== Men's 50 yard swim, open water ==
#	Time	Name	Nationality	Date	Meet	Location	Ref
-	31.8	W.B. Izard	United States	20 May 1893	United States	(straightaway in open still water)	
-	31.0	David Gaul	United States	15 August 1903	United States	(straightaway in open water, no turn)	
-	28.0	Zoltán Halmay	Hungary	6 September 1904	1904 Olympics	St. Louis, United States	
-	24.2	Duke Kahanamoku	United States	12 August 1912	Hawaii Chapter of the AAU	Honolulu, United States	(straightaway in open water, no turn)
-	24.0	Duke Kahanamoku	United States	11 June 1913	Honolulu	Honolulu, United States	(straightaway in open water, no turn)
-	23.0	Duke Kahanamoku	United States	11 June 1915	Honolulu	Honolulu, United States	(straightaway in open water, no turn)
