= Tennessee Volunteers men's swimming and diving =

Tennessee Volunteers
- Founded: 1934
- Athletic director: Danny White
- Head coach: Matt Kredich (12th season)
- Conference: Southeastern Conference
- Location: Knoxville, Tennessee, US
- Home pool: Allan Jones Intercollegiate Aquatic Center (capacity 3,800)
- Nickname: Tennessee Volunteers
- Colors: Orange, white, and smokey gray

NCAA Championship appearances
- 1969, 1970, 1971, 1972, 1973, 1974, 1975, 1976, 1977, 1978, 1979, 1980, 1981, 1982, 1983, 1984, 1985, 1986, 1987, 1988, 1989, 1990, 1991, 1992, 1993, 1994, 1995, 1996, 1997, 1998, 1999, 2000, 2001, 2002, 2003, 2004, 2005, 2006, 2007, 2008, 2009, 2010, 2011, 2012, 2013, 2014, 2015, 2016, 2017, 2018, 2019, 2021, 2022, 2023, 2024

Conference Champions
- 1969, 1972, 1973, 1974, 1975, 1976, 1977, 1978, 1989, 1996

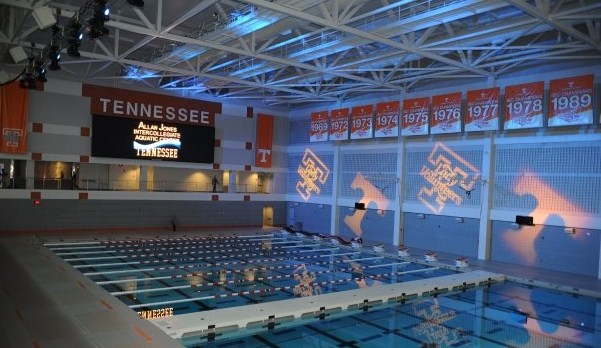
Allan Jones Aquatic Center

The Tennessee Volunteers men's Swimming and Diving program represents the University of Tennessee located in Knoxville, Tennessee. The Volunteers are currently coached by Matt Kredich. The Vols host their swim meets in the Allan Jones Intercollegiate Aquatic Center which was newly built in 2008. The Vols compete in the SEC where they have won 10 SEC team titles, 173 individual titles and 45 relay crowns. Over the past 75 years of competition the Vols have produced numerous All-Americans, 24 Olympians, scored in 53 consecutive NCAA Championship meets, won 45 individual NCAA titles and won 1 NCAA National Title.

The Vols are currently led by 12th year head coach Matt Kredich who was hired on April 12, 2012. He had previously served as the Lady Volunteer Swimming and Diving head coach beginning in 2005. He replaced long-time head coach and former UT swimmer John Trembley who was fired as head coach for embezzlement and inappropriate behavior on university grounds on January 3, 2012.

== Decade of dominance ==
When Ray Bussard was hired in 1968 as head coach for the Vols swimming & diving team the team hadn't competed at the NCAA level since 1959 and had never won a team SEC championship. In only his second year as head coach, Bussard won the school's first SEC title for men's swimming & diving and would go on to compete in the NCAA tournament. Beginning in the 1970s, Tennessee won the 400m-freestyle relay at the SEC Championships ten straight years. During that ten-year span, Tennessee earned five straight 800m-freestyle relay titles and won the 400m medley crown nine out of 11 times. In 1978, the team won the NCAA championship. On the first day of the championship meet, the Vols jumped out to a 24-point lead which they did not relinquish. The title was not only a first for a team from the Southeastern Conference but also a first for any team in the South. When Bussard retired in 1988, he finished with a 252–20 overall record and a .926 winning percentage, making him the winningest swimming and diving coach in Tennessee history. He left the school having earned NCAA Coach of the Year in 1972 and 1978, as well as SEC Coach of the Year in 1972, 1973, 1975, 1977, and 1978. In 2008, Bussard was inducted in the American Swimming Coaches Association's Hall of Fame.

== Head coaches ==
#	Coach	Years	Seasons	Record			SEC; Titles	NCAA; Top 10	NCAA; Top 5	NCAA; Titles
#	Coach	Years	Seasons	Won	Lost	%	SEC; Titles	NCAA; Top 10	NCAA; Top 5	NCAA; Titles
1	Burney Slater	1934-1937	4	15	8	.652	–	–	–	–
2	Godfrey Novelty	1938-1942	5	26	18	.598	–	–	–	–
3	Karl Bahret	1947-1953	6	20	13	.606	–	–	–	–
*	Karl Bahret	1958-1959	2	3	4	.429	–	–	–	–
4	Ray Bussard	1968-1988	21	252	20	.926	8	10	8	1
5	John Trembley	1989-2012	23	282	65	.813	2	16	5	–
6	Matt Kredich	2013–present	12	92	43	.681	–	2	–	–
Total			72	690	171	.801	10	28	13	1

== Yearly record ==
Season	Coach	Meet Record	SEC Meet	NCAA Meet
Southeastern Conference
1934	Burney Slater	1-3	–	–
1935	Burney Slater	3-1	–	–
1936	Burney Slater	7-3	–	–
1937	Burney Slater	4-1	–	–
1938	Godfrey Novotny	8-2	5th (10)	–
1939	Godfrey Novotny	4-5	4th (3)	–
1940	Godfrey Novotny	4-6-1	T-5th (10)	–
1941	Godfrey Novotny	6-2	2nd (44)	–
1942	Godfrey Novotny	4-3	–	–
1943-1946 No Team
1947	Karl Bahret	3-1	–	–
1948	Karl Bahret	0-3	–	–
1949	Karl Bahret	7-0	–	–
1950	Karl Bahret	2-4	–	–
1951	Karl Bahret	3-1	5th (8)	–
1952	Karl Bahret	1-1	5th (12)	–
1954	Karl Bahret	4-3	–	–
1955-1957 No Team
1958	Karl Bahret	1-2	–	–
1959	Karl Bahret	2-2	–	–
1960-1967 No Team
1968	Ray Bussard	9-1	2nd (383.5)	–
1969	Ray Bussard	13-1	1st (508)	32nd (2)
1970	Ray Bussard	10-0	2nd (519)	9th (65)
1971	Ray Bussard	12-0	2nd (548)	6th (126)
1972	Ray Bussard	12-0	1st (620)	3rd (170)
1973	Ray Bussard	12-0	1st (676)	2nd (294)
1974	Ray Bussard	13-0	1st (633)	3rd (240)
1975	Ray Bussard	16-0	1st (612)	4th (174)
1976	Ray Bussard	15-1	1st (649)	2nd (237)
1977	Ray Bussard	11-2	1st (511)	3rd (182)
1978	Ray Bussard	12-1	1st (525)	1st (307)
1979	Ray Bussard	11-2	2nd (484.5)	4th (221)
1980	Ray Bussard	9-3	3rd (325)	11th (221)
1981	Ray Bussard	9-5	4th (270)	T-17th (18)
1982	Ray Bussard	11-1	4th (288)	T-29th (5)
1983	Ray Bussard	9-1	4th (299)	13th (36)
1984	Ray Bussard	13-0	4th (291)	22nd (10)
1985	Ray Bussard	11-1	4th (439)	21st (28)
1986	Ray Bussard	17-0	2nd (532.5)	12th (78)
1987	Ray Bussard	15-0	3rd (516.5)	T-14th (69)
1988	Ray Bussard	12-1	3rd (461.5)	23rd (32.5)
1989	John Trembley	14-3	1st (764.5)	9th (160)
1990	John Trembley	13-1	2nd (754)	8th (195)
1991	John Trembley	13-0	2nd (600)	5th (249)
1992	John Trembley	9-4	4th (475)	11th (150)
1993	John Trembley	12-1	3rd (549)	8th (170)
1994	John Trembley	12-12	3rd (596)	9th (150.5)
1995	John Trembley	16-2	2nd (676.5)	6th (230)
1996	John Trembley	22-3	1st (846)	5th (311.5)
1997	John Trembley	26-0	2nd (680)	5th (235.5)
1998	John Trembley	9-6	3rd (515)	4th (233)
1999	John Trembley	9-1	2nd (700)	7th (171)
2000	John Trembley	7-3	3rd (637)	T-7th (171)
2001	John Trembley	21-0	2nd (632.5)	3rd (330.5)
2002	John Trembley	14-1	4th (476)	12th (144)
2003	John Trembley	12-3	4th (455)	16th (86)
2004	John Trembley	12-4	4th (369)	8th (140)
2005	John Trembley	6-7	6th (303)	17th (50)
2006	John Trembley	14-2	4th (715.5)	11th (128)
2007	John Trembley	12-3	4th (349.5)	11th (128)
2008	John Trembley	14-4	3rd (562)	9th (172)
2009	John Trembley	7-3	3rd (584)	8th (144)
2010	John Trembley	7-3	4th (417.5)	17th (56)
2011	John Trembley	7-4	3rd (602.5)	12th (106.5)
2012	John Trembley	5-5	4th (459)	22nd (34)
2013	Matt Kredich	6-4	4th (787.5)	16th (59)
2014	Matt Kredich	6-4	6th (713)	15th (98)
2015	Matt Kredich	12-8	4th (918)	14th (111)
2016	Matt Kredich	6-6-1	6th (745)	7th (188)
2017	Matt Kredich	3-11	6th (770.5)	20th (55)
2018	Matt Kredich	11-2-1	4th (899)	11th (123)
2019	Matt Kredich	10-4	3rd (917)	11th (105)
2020	Matt Kredich	9-3	6th (817)	N/A
2021	Matt Kredich	3-2	3rd (850.5)	20th (48)
2022	Matt Kredich	11-2	T-2nd (938)	18th (72.5)
2023	Matt Kredich	9-2	3rd (1035.5)	7th (216.5)
2024	Matt Kredich	6-4	5th (992)	6th (231)
Total		690-171-3	10	1

Note: The 2020 season was canceled after the SEC Championships due to the Coronavirus Pandemic, the NCAA Championships were not held.

== NCAA Individual & Relay champions ==
The Vols have won 46 NCAA Individual, Relay, and Diving NCAA titles all time.

Individual & Diving
Year	Name	Event	Time/Score
1970	David Edgar	50 Freestyle	20.93
1970	David Edgar	100 Freestyle	46.06
1971	David Edgar	50 Freestyle	20.30
1971	David Edgar	100 Freestyle	44.69
1972	David Edgar	50 Freestyle	20.442
1972	David Edgar	100 Freestyle	45.003
1973	John Trembley	50 Freestyle	20.337
1973	John Trembley	100 Freestyle	45.090
1973	John Trembley	100 Butterfly	48.688
1974	John Trembley	50 Freestyle	20.234
1974	John Trembley	100 Butterfly	48.718
1975	Lee Engstrand	400 Individual Medley	3:57.80
1976	Matt Vogel	100 Butterfly	48.95
1976	Lee Engstrand	200 Individual Medley	1:50.13
1976	Jim Kennedy	1-Meter Diving	514.29
1978	Andy Coan	50 Freestyle	20.29
1978	Andy Coan	100 Freestyle	44.10
1979	Andy Coan	100 Freestyle	43.42
1979	Andy Coan	200 Freestyle	1:35.62
1979	Andy Coan	50 Freestyle	19.92
1989	Mel Stewart	200 Butterfly	1:44.30
1991	Mel Stewart	200 Butterfly	1:41.78
1993	Tripp Schwenk	200 Backstroke	1:42.06
1994	Evan Stewart	3-Meter Diving	614.65
1995	Evan Stewart	3-Meter Diving	655.40
1996	Ricky Busquets	100 Freestyle	42.64
1996	Jeremy Linn	100 Breaststroke	53.04
1997	Jeremy Linn	100 Breaststroke	53.32
1997	Jeremy Linn	200 Breaststroke	1:55.27
1998	Jeremy Linn	100 Breaststroke	53.01
1999	Michael Gilliam	100 Backstroke	47.12
2001	Michael Gilliam	100 Backstroke	45.97
2003	Phillip Jones	3-Meter Diving	649.70
2004	Phillip Jones	1-Meter Diving	388.65
2016	Liam Stone	1-Meter Diving	453.70
2018	Zhipeng (Colin) Zeng	Platform Diving	466.35
2019	Zhipeng (Colin) Zeng	1-Meter Diving	405.40
2023	Jordan Crooks	50 Freestyle	18.32

Relay
Year	Name	Event	Time
1972	Tom Lutz, Ken Knox, David Edgar, John Trembley	400 Freestyle Relay	3:01.118
1973	Ken Knox, Tom Lutz, Keith Gilliam, John Trembley	400 Freestyle Relay	3:00.363
1973	Kevin Priestley, Rick Seywert, John Trembley, Tom Lutz	400 Medley Relay	3:22.986
1974	Kevin Priestly, Rick Seywert, John Trembley, Tom Lutz	400 Medley Relay	3:22.788
1978	Bob Sells, Andy Coan, John Ebuna, John Newton	400 Freestyle Relay	2:55.66
1979	John Ebuna, John Newton, Marc Foreman, Andy Coan	400 Freestyle Relay	2:54.74
1996	Craig Gilliam, Jeremy Linn, Jim Rumbaugh, Ricky Busquets	200 Medley Relay	1:25.85
1996	Craig Gilliam, Jeremy Linn, Jim Rumbaugh, Ricky Busquets	400 Medley Relay	3:09.97

== Conference Individual Event Champions ==
The Vols have won 227 total SEC individual, relay, and diving titles throughout their history.

Event	Titles
50 Freestyle	15
100 Freestyle	14
200 Freestyle	7
500 Freestyle	10
1650 Freestyle	5
100 Backstroke	17
200 Backstroke	9
100 Breaststroke	10
200 Breaststroke	12
100 Butterfly	12
200 Butterfly	8
200 Individual Medley	5
400 Individual Medley	8
1-Meter Diving	20
3-Meter Diving	19
Platform Diving	9
200 Freestyle Relay	4
400 Freestyle Relay	14
800 Freestyle Relay	7
200 Medley Relay	8
400 Medley Relay	14

== Tennessee Volunteers Olympians ==
The University of Tennessee has had 24 Olympians represent Tennessee's swimming and diving program since the 1970s. Since that time they have earned 11 medals including two individual gold medalists and five gold medals earned as part of a relay. The following list include all of the former and current Olympic participants.

As of the 2020 Tokyo Olympics

=== Medalists ===
Athlete	Country	Olympics	Event	Medal
David Edgar	United States	1972 Munich	4 × 100 m free relay	Gold
Jeremy Linn	United States	1996 Atlanta	4 × 100 m medley relay	Gold
Jeremy Linn	United States	1996 Atlanta	100 m breaststroke	Silver
Tripp Schwenk	United States	1996 Atlanta	4 × 100 m medley relay	Gold
Tripp Schwenk	United States	1996 Atlanta	200 m backstroke	Silver
Melvin Stewart	United States	1992 Barcelona	200 m butterfly	Gold
Melvin Stewart	United States	1992 Barcelona	4 × 100 m medley relay	Gold
Melvin Stewart	United States	1992 Barcelona	4 × 200 m free relay	Bronze
Matt Vogel	United States	1976 Montreal	100 m butterfly	Gold
Matt Vogel	United States	1976 Montreal	4 × 100 m medley relay	Gold
Graham Windeatt	Australia	1972 Munich	1500 metre freestyle	Silver

=== Participants ===
Athlete	Country	Olympics
Octavio Alesi	Venezuela	2008 Beijing
Octavio Alesi	Venezuela	2012 London
Andrew Bree	Ireland	2000 Sydney
Andrew Bree	Ireland	2008 Beijing
Ray Brown	Canada	1992 Barcelona
Ricardo Busquets	Puerto Rico	1992 Barcelona
Ricardo Busquets	Puerto Rico	1996 Atlanta
Ricardo Busquets	Puerto Rico	2000 Sydney
Ricardo Busquets	Puerto Rico	2004 Athens
Gabi Chereches	Romania	1992 Barcelona
Gabi Chereches	Romania	1996 Atlanta
Gabi Chereches	Romania	2000 Sydney
George Du Rand	South Africa	2008 Beijing
J.R. de Souza	Brazil	1992 Barcelona
Lyubomir Epitropov	Bulgaria	2020 Tokyo
Michael Houlie	South Africa	2020 Tokyo
Lars Jorgensen	United States	1988 Seoul
Paulo Machado	Brazil	2004 Athens
Geri Mewett	Bermuda	1992 Barcelona
Barry Murphy	Ireland	2012 London
Jonas Persson	Sweden	2008 Beijing
Kyle Smerdon	Canada	2000 Sydney
Evan Stewart	Zimbabwe	1992 Barcelona
Evan Stewart	Zimbabwe	1996 Atlanta
Evan Stewart	Zimbabwe	2000 Sydney
Jevon Tarantino	United States	2008 Beijing
Sal Vasallo	Puerto Rico	1988 Seoul

== See also ==
- Tennessee Volunteers women's swimming and diving
- Swimming at the Summer Olympics
