= 1997 NCAA Division I Men's Swimming and Diving Championships =

American college aquatic sports competition

1997 NCAA Division I Swimming and Diving Championships
- Host city: Minneapolis, Minnesota
- Date: March 1997
- Venue(s): University Aquatic Center; University of Minnesota

The 1997 NCAA Division I Men's Swimming and Diving Championships were contested in March 1997 at the University Aquatic Center at the University of Minnesota in Minneapolis, Minnesota at the 74th annual NCAA-sanctioned swim meet to determine the team and individual national champions of Division I men's collegiate swimming and diving in the United States.

Auburn topped the team standings for the first time, finishing 156.5 points ahead of Stanford.

== Team standings ==
- Note: Top 10 only
- (H) = Hosts
- ^{(DC)} = Defending champions
- Full results

Rank	Team	Points
1st place, gold medalist(s)	Auburn	496 1/2
2nd place, silver medalist(s)	Stanford	340
3rd place, bronze medalist(s)	Georgia	297
4	Texas ^{(DC)}	286
5	Tennessee	235 1/2
6	USC	235
7	Michigan	209
8	Miami (FL)	197
9	Florida State	160
10	SMU	157
12	Minnesota (H)	109

== Swimming results ==
Event	Gold		Silver		Bronze	
50 freestyle	Brett Hawke; Auburn	19.19	Neil Walker; Texas	19.25	Brendon Dedekind; Florida State	19.26
100 freestyle	Lars Frölander; SMU	42.89	Nick Shackell; Auburn	43.07	Brock Newman; Auburn	43.23
200 freestyle	John Piersma; Michigan	1:34.88	Miroslav Vučetić; Syracuse	1:35.75	Scott Tucker; Auburn	1:35.88
500 freestyle	John Piersma; Michigan	4:15.79	Ryk Neethling; Arizona	4:16.46	Chris Rumley; Michigan	4:18.56
1650 freestyle	Ryk Neethling; Arizona	14:43.44	Tyler Painter; Kansas	15:00.41	Nat Lewis; Kentucky	15:00.73
100 backstroke	Neil Walker; Texas	45.25	Lenny Krayzelburg; USC	46.55	Tom Tracey; Villanova	47.57
200 backstroke	Lenny Krayzelburg; USC	1:41.10	Bartosz Sikora; California	1:42.95	Kris Babylon; Georgia	1:43.74
100 breaststroke	Jeremy Linn; Tennessee	52.32	Michael Norment; Georgia	53.58	Adam Jerger; Auburn	53.75
200 breaststroke	Jeremy Linn; Tennessee	1:55.27	Nate Thompson; LSU	1:56.31	Vilmos Kovacs; Purdue	1:56.80
100 butterfly	Lars Frölander; SMU	46.28	Adam Pine; Nebraska	46.40	Sabir Muhammad; Stanford	46.70
200 butterfly	Steve Parry; Florida State	1:44.28	Jeff Julian; USC	1:44.61	Tom Malchow; Michigan	1:44.85
200 IM	Kris Babylon; Georgia	1:45.19	Scott Tucker; Auburn	1:45.44	Lionel Moreau; Auburn	1:46.39
400 IM	Tom Wilkens; Stanford	3:45.59	Bartosz Sikora; California	3:45.80	Kris Babylon; Georgia	3:47.14
200 freestyle relay	Auburn; Brett Hawke (19.43); Matthew Busbee (19.35); Aaron Ciarla (19.19); Nick Shackell (19.57)	1:17.54	Texas; Brian Esway (19.85); Chris Eckerman (19.42); Nathan Stallworth (19.22); Steve Martyak (19.37)	1:17.86	Stanford; Scott Claypool (19.75); Sabir Muhammad (19.50); Chris Olsen (19.42); Jed Crowe (19.20)	1:17.87
400 freestyle relay	Auburn; Scott Tucker (43.59); Brock Newman (42.93); Brett Hawke (42.57); Nick Shackell (42.14)	2:51.23	Stanford; Dod Wales (43.59); Glenn Counts (43.41); Jed Crowe (43.57); Scott Claypool (43.10)	2:53.67	Arizona State; Francisco Sánchez (42.98); Felipe Delgado (43.37); Nelson Vargas (44.71); Craig Hutchison (43.26)	2:54.32
800 freestyle relay	Michigan; Tom Malchow (1:37.34); Chris Rumley (1:36.29); John Reich (1:35.96); John Piersma (1:33.92)	6:23.51	Auburn; Romain Barnier (1:37.54); Brock Newman (1:36.96); Nick Shackell (1:35.68); Scott Tucker (1:35.55)	6:25.73	Texas	6:27.25
200 medley relay	Auburn; Michael Bartz (22.09); Adam Jerger (23.96); John Hargis (20.73); Brett Hawke (18.62)	1:25.40; US	Texas; Neil Walker (20.87); Jeff Livingston (24.47); Carlos Arena (21.26); Nathan Stallworth (19.28)	1:25.88	Tennessee; Craig Gilliam (21.32); Jeremy Linn (23.56); Adam Engle (21.45); Brendan Crowley (19.75)	1:26.08
400 medley relay	Auburn; Michael Bartz (47.28); Adam Jerger (53.12); John Hargis (45.80); Brock Newman (42.76)	3:08.96	Texas; Neil Walker (45.07); Jeff Livingston (54.27); Bryan Jones (46.76); Chris Eckerman (43.43)	3:09.53	Stanford; Sabir Muhammad (46.80); Tom Wilkens (54.26); Jed Crowe (46.77); Scott Claypool (42.82)	3:10.65

Legend: US – U.S. Open record;

== Diving results ==
Event	Gold		Silver		Bronze	
1 m diving	Rio Ramirez; Miami	610.05	Evan Stewart; Tennessee	590.10	Tyce Routson; Miami	575.10
3 m diving	Tyce Routson; Miami	643.10	Evan Stewart; Tennessee	632.80	Rio Ramirez; Miami	624.00
Platform diving	Tyce Routson; Miami	811.80	Bryan Gillooly; Miami	810.70	Brent Roberts; Alabama	779.40

== See also ==
- List of college swimming and diving teams
