= 1996 NCAA Division I Men's Swimming and Diving Championships =

American college aquatic sports competition

1996 NCAA Division I Swimming and Diving Championships
- Host city: Austin, Texas
- Date: March 1996
- Venue(s): Texas Swimming Center; University of Texas

The 1996 NCAA Division I Men's Swimming and Diving Championships were contested in March 1996 at the Texas Swimming Center at the University of Texas in Austin, Texas at the 73rd annual NCAA-sanctioned swim meet to determine the team and individual national champions of Division I men's collegiate swimming and diving in the United States.

Hosts Texas topped the team standings, the Longhorns' sixth men's title (and first since 1991, the last time the championships were held in Austin).

== Team standings ==
- Note: Top 10 only
- (H) = Hosts
- ^{(DC)} = Defending champions
- Full results

Rank	Team	Points
1st place, gold medalist(s)	Texas (H)	479
2nd place, silver medalist(s)	Auburn	443 1/2
3rd place, bronze medalist(s)	Michigan ^{(DC)}	358
4	Stanford	312
5	Tennessee	311 1/2
6	SMU	228
7	USC	188
8	Miami (FL)	151
9	Arizona State	142
10	Florida	140

== Swimming results ==
Event	Gold		Silver		Bronze	
50 freestyle	Francisco Sánchez; Arizona State	19.35	Ricardo Busquets; Tennessee	19.45	Felipe Delgado; Arizona State	19.75
100 freestyle	Ricardo Busquets; Tennessee	42.64	Francisco Sánchez; Arizona State	42.89	Neil Walker; Texas	43.29
200 freestyle	Béla Szabados; FAU	1:34.33	John Piersma; Michigan	1:34.70	Uğur Taner; California	1:35.21
500 freestyle	Tom Dolan; Michigan	4:12.77	John Piersma; Michigan	4:14.55	Matt Hooper; Texas	4:15.38
1650 freestyle	Tom Dolan; Michigan	14:38.37	Kevin Radvany; Stanford	14:53.73	Matt Hooper; Texas	14:57.11
100 backstroke	Ryan Berube; SMU	46.15	Neil Walker; Texas	46.60	Michael Andrews; Auburn	47.05
200 backstroke	Ryan Berube; SMU	1:41.23	Brad Bridgewater; USC	1:41.88	Michael Andrews; Auburn	1:43.23
100 breaststroke	Jeremy Linn; Tennessee	53.04	Matthew Buck; Georgia	53.47	Adam Jerger; Auburn	54.09
200 breaststroke	Matthew Buck; Georgia	1:56.62	Jeremy Linn; Tennessee	1:56.78	Vilmos Kovacs; Purdue	1:57.41
100 butterfly	Martin Pepper; Arizona	46.74	Jason Lancaster; Michigan	47.01	Ricardo Busquets; Tennessee	47.03
200 butterfly	Uğur Taner; California	1:43.22	Tom Malchow; Michigan	1:44.64	Ray Carey; Stanford	1:44.91
200 IM	Ryan Berube; SMU	1:44.85	Scott Tucker; Auburn	1:45.61	Jason Lancaster; Michigan	1:45.70
400 IM	Tom Dolan; Michigan	3:41.44	Matt Hooper; Texas	3:45.50	Iian Mull; Michigan State	3:45.89
200 freestyle relay	Texas; Brian Esway (20.01); Sean McGrath (19.34); Steve Martyak (19.19); Neil Walker (19.36)	1:17.90	Tennessee; Ricardo Busquets (19.77); Devin Pietrzak (19.45); Craig Gilliam (19.55); Jon McGowen (19.60)	1:18.37	Stanford; Chris Olsen (20.24); Scott Claypool (19.53); Jed Crowe (19.54); Sabir Muhammad (19.34)	1:18.65
400 freestyle relay	Auburn; Oliver Gumbrill (44.08); Nick Shackell (42.78); Brock Newman (43.15); Scott Tucker (42.88)	2:52.87	SMU; Ryan Berube (43.15); Lars Frölander (42.99); Jeff Foley (43.88); Enrico Linscheer (43.49)	2:53.51	Tennessee; Ricardo Busquets (42.68); Devin Pietrzak (44.01); Shawn McNew (43.97); Jon McGowen (43.29)	2:53.95
800 freestyle relay	Michigan; Chris Rumley (1:36.10); Jason Lancaster (1:35.90); John Piersma (1:34.98); Tom Dolan (1:33.91)	6:20.89; US, AR	Texas; Chris Archer (1:37.16); Chris Eckerman (1:36.79); Craig Brockman (1:36.96); Matt Hooper (1:35.20)	6:26.11	SMU; Blaine Morgan (1:39.28); Lars Frölander (1:35.12); John Simmons (1:38.43); Ryan Berube (1:33.79)	6:26.62
200 medley relay	Tennessee; Craig Gilliam (21.67); Jeremy Linn (23.73); Jim Rumbaugh (21.23); Ricardo Busquets (19.22)	1:25.85; US	Texas; Neil Walker (21.45); Martin Hubbell (24.35); Matt Beck (21.12); Steve Martyak (19.40)	1:26.32	Auburn; Michael Andrews (22.09); Adam Jerger (24.08); John Hargis (20.85); Oliver Gumbrill (19.48)	1:26.50
400 medley relay	Tennessee; Craig Gilliam (48.39); Jeremy Linn (52.01); Jim Rumbaugh (47.09); Ricardo Busquets (42.48)	3:09.97	Texas; Neil Walker (46.64); Martin Hubbell (54.02); Matt Beck (46.84); Chris Eckerman (43.06)	3:10.56	Auburn; Michael Andrews (47.15); Adam Jerger (53.61); John Hargis (46.50); Nick Shackell (43.39)	3:10.65

Legend: US – U.S. Open record; AR – American record;

== Diving results ==
Event	Gold		Silver		Bronze	
1 m diving	P.J. Bogart; Minnesota	564.90	Evan Stewart; Tennessee	556.50	Bryan Gillooly; Miami	551.95
3 m diving	Chris Mantilla; Miami	648.00	Bryan Gillooly; Miami	644.35	Tyce Routson; Miami	631.25
Platform diving	Bryan Gillooly; Miami	789.75	Tyce Routson; Miami	783.25	Chris Mantilla; Miami	761.80

== See also ==
- List of college swimming and diving teams
