= 1972 NCAA University Division swimming and diving championships =

American college aquatic sports competition

- Host city: (New York (state)) West Point, New York
- Date(s): March 1972
- Venue(s): Crandall Pool; United States Military Academy
- Teams: 29
- Events: 18

The 1972 NCAA University Division swimming and diving championships were contested at the 36th annual swim meet sanctioned and hosted by the NCAA to determine the individual and team national champions of men's collegiate swimming and diving among its University Division member programs in the United States, culminating the 1971–72 NCAA University Division swimming and diving season.

These championships were hosted by the United States Military Academy at Crandall Pool on its campus in West Point, New York.

Four-time defending champions Indiana again topped the team championship standings, the Hoosiers' fifth NCAA national title.

== Team standings ==
- (H) = Hosts
- (DC) = Defending champions
- Italics = Debut appearance

Rank	Team	Points
1st place, gold medalist(s)	Indiana (DC)	390
2nd place, silver medalist(s)	USC	371
3rd place, bronze medalist(s)	Tennessee	170
4	UCLA	168
5	SMU	121
6	Washington	109
7	Florida	99
8	Stanford	91
9	Ohio State	89
10	Michigan	47
11	Southern Illinois	42
12	Yale	35
13	Princeton	33
14	Minnesota	29
15	Cornell	27
16	NC State	26
17	Oregon	25
18	Pacific	16
19	Michigan State	14
20	BYU	13
21	Long Beach State	10
22	LSU	4
22	Penn	4
22	Texas	4
22	Villanova	4
22	Wisconsin	4
27	Johns Hopkins	5
28	Harvard	2
29	UC Santa Barbara	1

== Individual events ==
=== Swimming ===
Event	Champion	Team	Time
50 yard freestyle	David Edgar (DC)	Tennessee	20.442
100 yard freestyle	David Edgar (DC)	Tennessee	45.003
200 yard freestyle	Jerry Heidenreich	SMU	1:38.357
500 yard freestyle	John Kinsella (DC)	Indiana	4:24.496
1,650 yard freestyle	John Kinsella (DC)	Indiana	15:33.582
100 yard backstroke	Paul Gilbert	Yale	51.293
200 yard backstroke	Charles Campbell	Princeton	1:50.557
100 yard breaststroke	Tom Bruce	UCLA	56.998
200 yard breaststroke	Brian Job (DC)	Stanford	2:02.592
100 yard butterfly	Mark Spitz (DC)	Indiana	47.988
200 yard butterfly	Mark Spitz (DC)	Indiana	1:46.898
200 yard individual medley	Gary Hall Sr. (DC)	Indiana	1:51.507
400 yard individual medley	Gary Hall Sr. (DC)	Indiana	3:58.717
400 yard freestyle relay	Thomas Lutz; Kenneth Knox; David Edgar; John Trembley	Tennessee	3:01.118
800 yard freestyle relay	Edward McCleskey; Stephen Tyrrell; Tom McBreen; Jim McConica	USC (DC)	6:38.635
400 yard medley relay	Bruce Kocsis; David Mayekawa; Frank Heckl; Michael Weston	USC	3:23.118

=== Diving ===
Event	Champion	Team	Score
1 meter diving	Todd Smith	Ohio State	503.25
3 meter diving	Craig Lincoln	Minnesota	545.4

== See also ==
- 1972 NCAA College Division swimming and diving championships
- 1972 NAIA swimming and diving championships
- List of college swimming and diving teams
