= Rafał Szukała =

Polish swimmer (born 1971)

Personal information
- Full name: Rafał Marek Szukała
- Nickname: "Polish Pistol"
- Nationality: Polish
- Born: 9 April 1971 (age 55) Poznań, Wielkopolskie, Poland
- Height: 1.82 m (6 ft 0 in)

Sport
- Sport: Swimming
- Strokes: Butterfly
- Club: Warta Poznań/Olimpia Poznań (POL)
- College team: Iowa Hawkeyes (USA)
Medal record
Men's swimming
Representing Poland
Olympic Games
Silver medal – second place	1992 Barcelona	100 m butterfly
World Championships (LC)
Gold medal – first place	1994 Rome	100 m butterfly
World Championships (SC)
Bronze medal – third place	1993 Palma	100 m butterfly
European Championships (LC)
Gold medal – first place	1989 Bonn	100 m butterfly
Gold medal – first place	1993 Sheffield	100 m butterfly
Silver medal – second place	1989 Bonn	200 m butterfly
Silver medal – second place	1991 Athens	200 m butterfly
Bronze medal – third place	1995 Vienna	100 m butterfly
Representing the Iowa Hawkeyes
Event	1st	2nd	3rd
NCAA Championships	2	0	1
Total	2	0	1
By race
Event	1st	2nd	3rd
100 y butterfly	1	0	1
200 y butterfly	1	0	0
Total	2	0	1
NCAA Championships
Gold medal – first place	1992 Indianapolis	200 y butterfly
Gold medal – first place	1994 Minneapolis	100 y butterfly
Bronze medal – third place	1993 Indianapolis	100 y butterfly

Rafał Marek Szukała, born on 9, April, 1971 in Poznań is a former Polish butterfly swimmer. He won the silver medal in the men's 100 m butterfly at the 1992 Summer Olympics in Barcelona, Spain.

Szukała competed in three consecutive Summer Olympics for Poland his native country, starting in 1988. He won his first major title in the 100 m butterfly at the 1989 European Aquatics Championships in Bonn. He regained the European title in 1993 and also won gold in the 100 m butterfly at the 1994 World Championships .

Szukała attended the University of Iowa, in the United States.

Olympic Games
Preceded by Waldemar Legień	Flagbearer for Poland; 1996 Atlanta	Succeeded by Andrzej Wroński
