= 1971 NCAA University Division swimming and diving championships =

American college aquatic sports competition

- Host city: Ames, Iowa
- Date(s): March 1971
- Venue(s): Beyer Hall Pool; Iowa State University
- Teams: 32
- Events: 18

The 1971 NCAA University Division swimming and diving championships were contested at the 35th annual swim meet sanctioned and hosted by the NCAA to determine the individual and team national champions of men's collegiate swimming and diving among its University Division member programs in the United States, culminating the 1970–71 NCAA University Division swimming and diving season.

These championships were hosted by Iowa State University at the Beyer Hall Pool on its campus in Ames, Iowa.

Three-time defending champions Indiana again topped the team championship standings, the Hoosiers' fourth NCAA national title.

== Team standings ==
- (H) = Hosts
- (DC) = Defending champions
- Italics = Debut appearance

Rank	Team	Points
1st place, gold medalist(s)	Indiana	351
2nd place, silver medalist(s)	USC	260
3rd place, bronze medalist(s)	UCLA	202
4	Stanford	155
5	Long Beach State	139
6	Tennessee	126
7	Washington	112
8	SMU	101
9	Ohio State	70
10	Michigan	69
11	Southern Illinois	50
12	Florida State	37
13	NC State	28
14	Florida	27
15	Minnesota	24
16	Wisconsin	23
11	Villanova	20
18	Michigan State	19
18	Penn	19
20	New Mexico	17
20	Pacific	17
22	Oregon	12
23	Dartmouth	10
23	Oklahoma	10
25	Cornell	9
26	Navy	7
27	Bucknell	6
27	Princeton	6
29	California	3
29	Harvard	3
31	Colorado State	1
31	Kansas	1

== Individual events ==
=== Swimming ===
Event	Champion	Team	Time
50 yard freestyle	David Edgar (DC)	Tennessee	20.30
100 yard freestyle	David Edgar (DC)	Tennessee	44.69
200 yard freestyle	Jim McConica	USC	1:39.75
500 yard freestyle	John Kinsella	Indiana	4:27.39
1,650 yard freestyle	John Kinsella	Indiana	15:26.51
100 yard backstroke	(Spain) Santiago Esteva	Indiana	51.71
200 yard backstroke	Gary Hall Sr.	Indiana	1:50.60
100 yard breaststroke	Brian Job (DC)	Stanford	57.24
200 yard breaststroke	Brian Job (DC)	Stanford	2:03.39
100 yard butterfly	Mark Spitz (DC)	Indiana	49.42
200 yard butterfly	Mark Spitz	Indiana	1:50.10
200 yard individual medley	Gary Hall Sr.	Indiana	1:52.20
400 yard individual medley	Gary Hall Sr. (DC)	Indiana	3:58.25
400 yard freestyle relay	Kim Tutt; Jim McConica; Michael Weston; Frank Heckl	USC (DC)	3:02.38
800 yard freestyle relay	Jim McConica; Kim Tutt; Tom McBreen; Frank Heckl	USC (DC)	6:39.04
400 yard medley relay	Fred Haywood; Brian Job; John Ferris; Martin Pedley	Stanford (DC)	3:22.51

=== Diving ===
Event	Champion	Team	Score
1 meter diving	Mike Finneran	Ohio State	520.98
3 meter diving	Phil Boggs	Florida State	552.93

== See also ==
- 1971 NCAA College Division swimming and diving championships
- 1971 NAIA swimming and diving championships
- List of college swimming and diving teams
