= 1998 NCAA Division I Men's Swimming and Diving Championships =

American college aquatic sports competition

1998 NCAA Division I Swimming and Diving Championships
- Host city: Auburn, Alabama
- Date: March 1998
- Venue(s): James E. Martin Aquatics Center; Auburn University

The 1998 NCAA Division I Men's Swimming and Diving Championships were contested in March 1998 at the James E. Martin Aquatics Center at Auburn University in Auburn, Alabama at the 75th annual NCAA-sanctioned swim meet to determine the team and individual national champions of Division I men's collegiate swimming and diving in the United States.

Stanford topped the team standings for the eighth time, finishing 104.5 points ahead of hosts and defending champions Auburn.

== Team standings ==
- Note: Top 10 only
- (H) = Hosts
- ^{(DC)} = Defending champions
- Full results

Rank	Team	Points
1st place, gold medalist(s)	Stanford	599
2nd place, silver medalist(s)	Auburn (H) ^{(DC)}	394 1/2
3rd place, bronze medalist(s)	Texas	362 1/2
4	Tennessee	233
5	USC	220
6	Arizona	185
7	Georgia	175 1/2
8	California	175
9	SMU	155 1/2
10	Arizona State	143

== Swimming results ==
Event	Gold		Silver		Bronze	
50 freestyle	Brendon Dedekind; Florida State	19.22	Aaron Ciarla; Auburn	19.45	Sabir Muhammad; Stanford	19.47
100 freestyle	Lars Frölander; SMU	42.12	Neil Walker; Texas	42.83	Dod Wales; Stanford	42.91
200 freestyle	Ryk Neethling; Arizona	1:34.19	Béla Szabados; USC	1:34.36	Michael Kiedel; Harvard	1:34.94
500 freestyle	Ryk Neethling; Arizona	4:13.42	Tom Malchow; Michigan	4:17.80	Chris Thompson; Michigan	4:18.75
1650 freestyle	Ryk Neethling; Arizona	14:32.50	Chris Thompson; Michigan	14:46.29	Tyler Painter; Kansas	14:54.31
100 backstroke	Neil Walker; Texas	46.66	Lenny Krayzelburg; USC	46.90	Tate Blahnik; Stanford	46.93
200 backstroke	Tate Blahnik; Stanford	1:41.21	Lenny Krayzelburg; USC	1:41.55	Gordan Kožulj; California	1:42.75
100 breaststroke	Jeremy Linn; Tennessee	53.01	Adam Jerger; Auburn	53.31	David Denniston; Auburn	53.68
200 breaststroke	Tom Wilkens; Stanford	1:55.02	Blake Holden; Stanford	1:56.90	Jeremy Linn; Tennessee	1:57.43
100 butterfly	Lars Frölander; SMU	45.59; US	Sabir Muhammad; Stanford	46.18^{[a]}	Dod Wales; Stanford	46.32
200 butterfly	Matthew Pierce; Stanford	1:43.68	Steve Brown; Stanford	1:44.00	Shamek Pietucha; Virginia	1:44.28
200 IM	Tom Wilkens; Stanford	1:45.16	Lionel Moreau; Auburn	1:45.76	Nate Dusing; Texas	1:46.80
400 IM	Tom Wilkens; Stanford	3:43.96	Steve Brown; Stanford	3:46.52	Owen Von Richter; Michigan	3:48.91
200 freestyle relay	Stanford; Anthony Robinson (19.66); Sabir Muhammad (18.79); Justin Ewers (19.39); Scott Claypool (18.92)	1:16.76; US, AR	Auburn; Matthew Busbee (19.79); Brock Newman (19.28); Brett Hawke (19.12); Aaron Ciarla (19.00)	1:17.19	Texas; Brian Esway (20.24); Neil Walker (19.17); Brian Jones (19.67); Steve Martyak (19.23)	1:18.31
400 freestyle relay	Stanford; Dod Wales (42.92); Sabir Muhammad (42.65); Glenn Counts (43.41); Scott Claypool (42.39)	2:51.37	Texas; Bryan Jones (43.88); Neil Walker (41.88); Nate Dusing (43.30); Jamie Rauch (42.76)	2:51.82	Arizona State; Francisco Sánchez (42.93); Pablo Abal (44.01); Scott Von Schoff (43.75); Craig Hutchison (43.34)	2:54.03
800 freestyle relay	Texas; Bryan Jones (1:36.72); Scott Goldblatt (1:36.42); Nate Dusing (1:35.73); Jamie Rauch (1:34.91)	6:23.78	Arizona; Chris Counts (1:36.87); Jay Schryver (1:35.82); Scott Gaskins (1:37.35); Ryk Neethling (1:33.97)	6:24.01	Harvard; Matthew Cornue (1:37.77); Alex Kurmakov (1:36.64); Eric Matuszak (1:37.02); Michael Kiedel (1:34.49)	6:25.92
200 medley relay	Auburn; Michael Bartz (21.97); Adam Jerger (23.57); Brett Hawke (20.57); Aaron Ciarla (19.13)	1:25.24; US	Stanford; Tate Blahnik (22.58); Anthony Robinson (24.55); Sabir Muhammad (19.74); Scott Claypool (18.83)	1:25.70	Tennessee; Craig Gilliam (21.69); Jeremy Linn (23.89); Adam Engle (20.96); Chris Olafson (19.71)	1:26.25
400 medley relay	Stanford; Tate Blahnik (47.09); Tom Wilkens (53.42); Sabir Muhammad (45.09); Dod Wales (42.13)	3:07.73	Auburn; Michael Bartz (47.00); Adam Jerger (52.77); Brock Newman (46.39); Brett Hawke (43.22)	3:09.38	Tennessee; Craig Gilliam (47.90); Jeremy Linn (52.13); Zane DeWitz (47.02); Casey Quilter (43.75)	3:10.80

Legend: US – U.S. Open record; AR – American record;

^{a} Although Sabir Muhammad's time of 46.18 was faster than the American record (46.26), it was not ratified because he exceeded the 15-meter limit for the underwater phase.

== Diving results ==
Event	Gold		Silver		Bronze	
1 m diving	Rio Ramirez; Miami	630.70	Bryan Gillooly; Miami	571.95	Daren Guertin; LSU	557.10
3 m diving	Bryan Gillooly; Miami	631.40	Rio Ramirez; Miami	599.15	Daren Guertin; LSU	597.95
Platform diving	Brent Roberts; Alabama	834.45	Paco Rivera; Kentucky	803.90	Mark Naftanel; Texas A&M	790.00

== See also ==
- List of college swimming and diving teams
