= 1970 NCAA University Division swimming and diving championships =

American college aquatic sports competition

1970 NCAA University Division Swimming and Diving Championships
- Host city: Salt Lake City, Utah
- Date: March 1970
- Venue(s): Ute Natatorium; University of Utah
- Teams: 28
- Events: 18

The 1970 NCAA University Division swimming and diving championships were contested at the 34th annual swim meet sanctioned and hosted by the NCAA to determine the individual and team national champions of men's collegiate swimming and diving among its University Division member programs in the United States, culminating the 1969–70 NCAA University Division swimming and diving season.

These championships were hosted by the University of Utah at the Ute Natatorium on its campus in Salt Lake City, Utah.

Two-time defending champions Indiana again topped the team championship standings, the Hoosiers' third NCAA national title.

== Team standings ==
- (H) = Hosts
- (DC) = Defending champions
- Italics = Debut appearance

Rank	Team	Points
1st place, gold medalist(s)	Indiana (DC)	332
2nd place, silver medalist(s)	USC	235
3rd place, bronze medalist(s)	Stanford	206
4	UCLA	185
5	Long Beach State	125
6	Michigan	118
7	SMU	96
8	Colorado State	85
9	Tennessee	75
10	Ohio State	68
11	Washington	67
12	Dartmouth	57
13	Texas–Arlington	45
14	Michigan State	43
15	Wisconsin	29
16	Oregon	27
17	Florida	26
18	Southern Illinois	19
19	Minnesota	18
20	Florida State	17
20	Princeton	17
22	Air Force	14
23	New Mexico	13.5
24	Villanova	10
25	Kansas	7
25	Oklahoma	7
27	Ohio	4.5
28	California	4

== Individual events ==
=== Swimming ===
Event	Champion	Team	Time
50 yard freestyle	David Edgar	Tennessee	20.93
100 yard freestyle	David Edgar	Tennessee	46.06
200 yard freestyle	(Peru) Juan Carlos Bello	Michigan	1:42.70
500 yard freestyle	Mike Burton	UCLA	4:37.29
1,650 yard freestyle	Mike Burton	UCLA	16:10.59
100 yard backstroke	Larry Barbiere	Indiana	51.91
200 yard backstroke	Mitch Ivey	Long Beach State	1:52.77
100 yard breaststroke	Brian Job	Stanford	57.57
200 yard breaststroke	Brian Job	Stanford	2:05.99
100 yard butterfly	Mark Spitz (DC)	Indiana	49.82
200 yard butterfly	Mike Burton	UCLA	1:51.60
200 yard individual medley	Frank Heckl	USC	1:55.21
400 yard individual medley	Gary Hall Sr.	Indiana	4:07.31
400 yard freestyle relay	Mark Mader; Mike Weston; Dan Frawley; Frank Heckl	USC (DC)	3:03.91
800 yard freestyle relay	Mark Mader; Jim McConica; Greg Charlton; Frank Heckl	USC (DC)	6:51.77
400 yard medley relay	Fred Haywood; Brian Job; John Ferris; Steve Carey	Stanford	3:24.99

=== Diving ===
Event	Champion	Team	Score
1 meter diving	Jim Henry (DC)	Indiana	487.56
3 meter diving	Jim Henry (DC)	Indiana	550.59

== See also ==
- 1970 NCAA College Division swimming and diving championships
- 1970 NAIA swimming and diving championships
- List of college swimming and diving teams
