= John Naber =

American swimmer (born 1956)

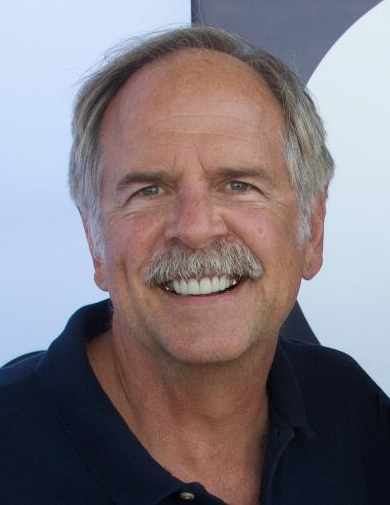
- Naber in 2016

Personal information
- Full name: John Phillips Naber
- National team: United States
- Born: January 20, 1956 (age 70) Evanston, Illinois, U.S.
- Height: 6 ft 6 in (1.98 m)
- Weight: 194 lb (88 kg)
- Website: johnnaber.com

Sport
- Sport: Swimming
- Strokes: Backstroke, freestyle
- Club: Ladera Oaks Swim Club
- College team: USC
- Coach: Peter Daland (USC)
Medal record
Representing the United States
Olympic Games
Gold medal – first place	1976 Montreal	100 m backstroke
Gold medal – first place	1976 Montreal	200 m backstroke
Gold medal – first place	1976 Montreal	4×200 m freestyle
Gold medal – first place	1976 Montreal	4×100 m medley
Silver medal – second place	1976 Montreal	200 m freestyle
World Championships (LC)
Bronze medal – third place	1973 Belgrade	200 m backstroke

John Phillips Naber (born January 20, 1956) is an American former competitive swimmer, five-time Olympic medalist and former world record-holder in multiple events.

Born in Evanston, Illinois, Naber studied in England and Italy where his father worked as a management consultant. He graduated from Woodside High School in Northern California, then completed his bachelor's degree in psychology in 1977 at the University of Southern California in Los Angeles. While at USC, he led the Trojans to four consecutive NCAA titles (1974–1977).

== 1976 Olympics ==
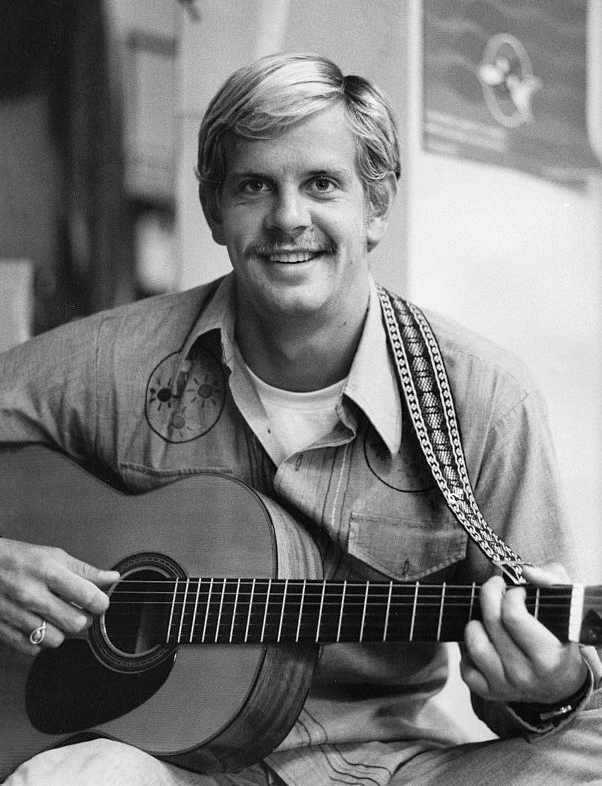
Naber in 1976

At age twenty, Naber won four gold medals at the 1976 Summer Olympics in Montreal, Quebec. Each of these victories was swum in world-record time; he swept the two backstroke events and was a member of two winning relay teams. He also won a silver medal in the 200-meter freestyle, part of a U.S. sweep for that event.

One of Naber's gold medals was for the first 200-meter backstroke completed in under two minutes; his world record time of 1:59.19 stood for seven years. His world record of 55.49 seconds in the 100-meter backstroke also stood for seven years.

For these accomplishments in Montreal and elsewhere, Naber won the 1977 James E. Sullivan Award, which is presented to the top American amateur athlete of the year. He was inducted into the International Swimming Hall of Fame as an "Honor Swimmer" in 1982.

== After swimming ==
Naber joined The Walt Disney Company in 1977 as a marketing representative, then became a full-time "roving ambassador" for the swimwear maker Speedo. He later was a sports broadcaster, motivational speaker, and professional writer. He was a member of the 1984 Los Angeles Olympics Organizing Committee.

In May 2014, Naber was inducted into Woodside High School's Community Hall of Fame.

== See also ==
- List of multiple Olympic gold medalists
- List of multiple Olympic gold medalists at a single Games
- List of Olympic medalists in swimming (men)
- List of University of Southern California people
- List of World Aquatics Championships medalists in swimming (men)
- World record progression 100 metres backstroke
- World record progression 200 metres backstroke
- World record progression 4 × 100 metres medley relay
- World record progression 4 × 200 metres freestyle relay

Records
Preceded by Roland Matthes	Men's 100-meter backstroke world record-holder (long course); July 18, 1976 – August 6, 1983	Succeeded by Rick Carey
Preceded by Roland Matthes	Men's 200-meter backstroke world record-holder (long course); June 19, 1976 – August 3, 1983	Succeeded by Rick Carey
Awards
Preceded by Tim Shaw	Swimming World; World Swimmer of the Year; 1976	Succeeded by Brian Goodell
