= Making a Splash =

Making a Splash may refer to:

- Making a Splash, a book written by Taylor MH
- Making a Splash, a 1984 film by Peter Greenaway

== See also ==
- Make a Splash, a child-focused water safety initiative created by the USA Swimming Foundation
