= Melvin Stewart =

American swimmer (born 1968)

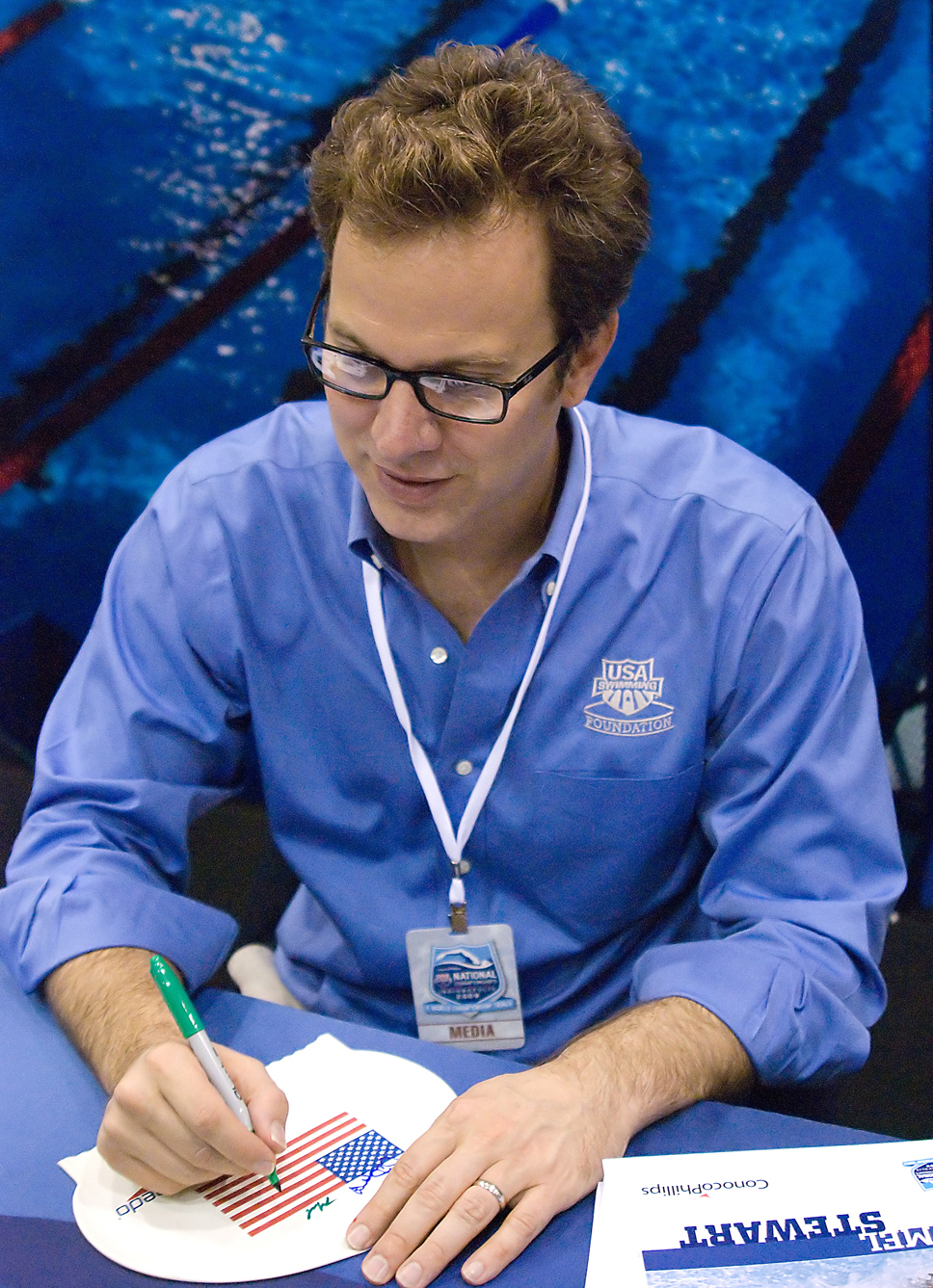
- Stewart in 2009

Personal information
- Full name: Melvin Monroe Stewart Jr.
- Nickname: "Mel"
- National team: United States
- Born: November 18, 1968 (age 57) Gastonia, North Carolina, U.S.
- Home town: Fort Mill, South Carolina, U.S.
- Height: 6 ft 2 in (1.88 m)
- Weight: 183 lb (83 kg)

Sport
- Sport: Swimming
- Strokes: Butterfly, freestyle
- College team: University of Tennessee
Medal record
Men's swimming
Representing the United States
Olympic Games
Gold medal – first place	1992 Barcelona	200 m butterfly
Gold medal – first place	1992 Barcelona	4×100 m medley
Bronze medal – third place	1992 Barcelona	4×200 m freestyle
World Championships (LC)
Gold medal – first place	1991 Perth	200 m butterfly
Silver medal – second place	1991 Perth	4×200 m freestyle
Pan Pacific Championships
Gold medal – first place	1987 Brisbane	200 m butterfly
Gold medal – first place	1989 Tokyo	200 m butterfly
Gold medal – first place	1989 Tokyo	4×200 m freestyle
Gold medal – first place	1991 Edmonton	200 m butterfly
Goodwill Games
Gold medal – first place	1986 Moscow	200 m butterfly
Gold medal – first place	1990 Seattle	200 m butterfly
Gold medal – first place	1994 St. Petersburg	200 m butterfly

Melvin Monroe Stewart Jr. (born November 18, 1968) is an American swimming promoter, former competition swimmer and world record-holder who won two gold medals and one bronze medal at the 1992 Summer Olympics in Barcelona, Spain. He is the co-founder and publisher of the swimming news website, SwimSwam, and a producer-director of commercials through his company, Gold Medal Media.

== Early life and education ==
Stewart was born in Gastonia, North Carolina and raised in Fort Mill, South Carolina. He began swimming competitively at the Johnston Memorial YMCA in Charlotte, North Carolina.

He attended Fort Mill High School until partway through his junior year at the school. That year, he switched high schools to Mercersburg Academy in Mercersburg, Pennsylvania after a sponsor paid Stewart's tuition expenses. At Mercersburg, he was coached by John Trembley.

Collegiately, he competed for the University of Tennessee, where he was again coached by John Trembley.

== Career ==
At the 1988 Summer Olympics in Seoul, South Korea, Stewart placed fifth in the men's 200-meter butterfly with a time of 1:59.19. The 1988 Olympics were the first Olympic Games Stewart competed in, qualifying for the event when he was 20 years old.

Following Seoul, Stewart began dominating the event. At the 1987, 1989, and 1991 Pan Pacific Swimming Championships Stewart won gold in the 200-meter butterfly. At the 1991 World Championships in Perth, Stewart won gold in the 200-meter butterfly, and set the world record with a time of 1:55.69.

At the 1992 Summer Olympics in Barcelona, Spain, Stewart won the 200-meter butterfly in an Olympic record time of 1:56.26. Stewart also won gold in the 4×100-meter medley relay by swimming in the prelims, and a bronze in the 4×200-meter freestyle relay.

When Stewart did not qualify for the 1996 Summer Olympics at the US Olympic Trials, he still attended the Olympic Games, this time as an analyst for ABC instead of as a swimmer. After the 1996 Summer Olympics, Stewart hosted a season of a television show titled "American Outback" on ESPN. He spent the next decade doing contract work writing screenplays.

In 2006, Stewart joined a team launching a new swimming news website through USA Swimming named SwimNetwork.com. His focus was bringing people to the website and managing the flow of traffic for the website.

Two years later, he began serving an ambassador to the United States Swimming Foundation, where one of his focuses since 2008 has been managing alumni of the US national team.

By 2010, Stewart was blogging and hosting an interview show. Not long after, USA Swimming shut SwimNetwork.com down, and Stewart started a new joint venture of his own.

In 2011, Stewart and a team of co-founders, including his wife Tiffany, Braden Keith, Gary Hall Jr., Garrett McCaffrey, and Rich Roll, founded the swimming news website SwimSwam. The website was launched on March 7, 2012, and a print magazine followed in 2016.

== Personal ==
Stewart and his wife Tiffany moved to Austin, Texas in 2009. Previously, they had been living in California. SwimSwam was headquartered in Austin in part because Stewart and his wife lived there.

== See also ==
- List of Olympic medalists in swimming (men)
- List of University of Tennessee people
- List of World Aquatics Championships medalists in swimming (men)
- World record progression 200 metres butterfly

Records
Preceded by Michael Gross	Men's 200-meter butterfly world record-holder (long course); January 12, 1991 – June 14, 1995	Succeeded by Denis Pankratov
