= 1973 NCAA University Division swimming and diving championships =

American college aquatic sports competition

1973 NCAA University Division Swimming and Diving Championships
- Host city: Knoxville, Tennessee
- Date(s): March 1973
- Venue(s): UT Student Aquatic Center; University of Tennessee

The 1973 NCAA University Division Swimming and Diving Championships were contested in March 1973 at the University of Tennessee Student Aquatic Center at the University of Tennessee in Knoxville, Tennessee at the 50th annual NCAA-sanctioned swim meet to determine the team and individual national champions of University Division men's collegiate swimming and diving in the United States.

Indiana again topped the team standings, the Hoosiers' sixth consecutive and sixth overall title.

== Team standings ==
- Note: Top 10 only
- (H) = Hosts
- (DC) = Defending champions
- Full results

Rank	Team	Points
1st place, gold medalist(s)	Indiana (DC)	358
2nd place, silver medalist(s)	Tennessee (H)	294
3rd place, bronze medalist(s)	USC	260
4	UCLA	168
5	Washington	150
6	Stanford	127
7	Michigan	88
8	NC State	81
9	SMU	67
10	Florida	64

== See also ==
- List of college swimming and diving teams
