= 1975 NCAA Division I Swimming and Diving Championships =

American college aquatic sports competition

- Host city: Cleveland, Ohio
- Date(s): March 1975
- Venue(s): CSU Natatorium; Cleveland State University

The 1975 NCAA Men's Division I Swimming and Diving Championships were contested in March 1975 at the Cleveland State University Natatorium at Cleveland State University in Cleveland, Ohio at the 52nd annual NCAA-sanctioned swim meet to determine the team and individual national champions of Division I men's collegiate swimming and diving in the United States.

USC again topped the team standings, the Trojans' second consecutive title and seventh overall.

== Team standings ==
- Note: Top 10 only
- (H) = Hosts
- (DC) = Defending champions
- Full results

Rank	Team	Points
1st place, gold medalist(s)	USC (DC)	344
2nd place, silver medalist(s)	Indiana	274
3rd place, bronze medalist(s)	UCLA	180
4	Tennessee	174
5	Alabama	165
6	Stanford	138
7	Washington	126
8	Auburn	88
9	Miami (FL)	65
10	Ohio State	48

== See also ==
- List of college swimming and diving teams
