= Jane Lloyd Jackman =

British-born American physician

- Born: 1944; England
- Died: 28 January 2023 (aged 79); Augusta, GA, U.S.
- Other name: Jane L. Jackman
- Education: University of Birmingham
- Occupation: Family Physician
- Known for: President of the Illinois State Medical Society, 1997–1998; founder of HealthFirst Community Clinic
- Spouse: Steve Jackman

Jane Lloyd Jackman (1944 – January 28, 2023) was a British-born American physician who practiced family medicine in Springfield, Illinois, for nearly four decades. She served as president of the Illinois State Medical Society (ISMS) from 1997 to 1998 — the second woman and the first from downstate Illinois to hold the office — and as president of the Sangamon County Medical Society from 1993 to 1994. She founded the HealthFirst Community Clinic, a free clinic for underprivileged and uninsured residents of Springfield and Menard County, and later became a public advocate for pulmonary fibrosis research and treatment following her own diagnosis with the disease.

== Early life and education ==
Jackman was a native of England. She graduated from the medical school of the University of Birmingham, and traveled to the United States as an exchange student during her final year of medical school. She completed an internship at St. Paul County Hospital in Minnesota before moving to Springfield, Illinois, where she practiced family medicine.

== Career ==
Jackman practiced family medicine in Springfield for nearly forty years, including at Capitol Healthcare, and served as an associate clinical professor in the Department of Family Practice at Southern Illinois University.

=== HealthFirst Community Clinic ===
In 1993, Jackman helped establish the HealthFirst Community Clinic, a free clinic created to provide organized medical care to uninsured and low-income residents of Sangamon and Menard counties. As president of the Sangamon County Medical Society at the time, she helped announce the clinic's first fundraising drive and spoke publicly about the need for a more organized system of care for uninsured patients. Jackman served as president of HealthFirst's board of directors as the clinic expanded its volunteer physician network, funding, and services in the years after it opened.

=== Organized medicine ===
Jackman served as a Fifth District trustee of the Illinois State Medical Society before being elected president-elect of the organization in 1996. She became president of the 18,000-member society in April 1997, serving through 1998, making her the second woman — and the first from downstate Illinois — to hold the ISMS presidency. Following her term, she spoke publicly about trends in medicine and health-care policy in Illinois, including tort reform and managed-care legislation. She also served as a delegate to the American Medical Association.

Jackman held several gubernatorial appointments to Illinois medical regulatory bodies. She was appointed to the Illinois Medical Licensing Board, with a term recorded as ending January 8, 2000, and continued to serve on the board in subsequent years; a 2012 Illinois Senate record lists her as the board's most recent holder of that office. She was also appointed to the Illinois State Board of Health, including a term beginning January 23, 2006, and is recorded as a board member in Illinois Department of Public Health meeting records from 2008, 2011, and 2012.

== Illness and advocacy ==
In 2011, Jackman was diagnosed with idiopathic pulmonary fibrosis (IPF), a progressive lung disease. In January 2017, she received a lung transplant. Following her transplant, Jackman became an advocate for the Pulmonary Fibrosis Foundation, and spoke publicly about her experience living with the disease, including in a 2022 interview with NPR Illinois.

Jackman's personal recollections were also recorded as part of an oral history memoir held in the University of Illinois Springfield digital collections.

== Personal life ==
Jackman was married to Steve Jackman, a competitive swimmer and radiologist. She died on January 28, 2023, of complications from COVID-19.
