= 2001 NCAA Division I Men's Swimming and Diving Championships =

American college aquatic sports competition

2001 NCAA Division I Swimming and Diving Championships
- Host city: College Station, Texas
- Date: March 22–24, 2001
- Venue(s): Student Recreation Center Natatorium; Texas A&M University

The 2001 NCAA Division I Men's Swimming and Diving Championships were contested from March 22–24, 2001 at the Student Recreation Center Natatorium at Texas A&M University in College Station, Texas at the 78th annual NCAA-sanctioned swim meet to determine the team, and individual national champions of Division I men's collegiate swimming and diving in the United States.

Texas again topped the team standings, finishing 140 points ahead of Stanford. It was the Longhorns' second consecutive and eighth overall national title.

== Team standings ==
- Note: Top 10 only
- (H) = Hosts
- ^{(DC)} = Defending champions
- Full results

Rank	Team	Points
1st place, gold medalist(s)	Texas ^{(DC)}	597 1/2
2nd place, silver medalist(s)	Stanford	457 1/2
3rd place, bronze medalist(s)	Tennessee	330 1/2
4	USC	299
5	Florida	265
6	Arizona	251
7	Auburn	236
8	California	191
9	Minnesota	176
10	Michigan	161

== Swimming results ==
Event	Gold		Silver		Bronze	
50 freestyle	Anthony Robinson; Stanford	19.15	Anthony Ervin; California	19.23	Roland Schoeman; Arizona	19.29
100 freestyle	Anthony Ervin; California	41.80 =US, =AR	Roland Schoeman; Arizona	42.58	Gregory Busse; Auburn	42.65
200 freestyle	Klete Keller; USC	1:34.43	Chris Kemp; Texas	1:34.69	Adam Messner; Stanford	1:35.05
500 freestyle	Klete Keller; USC	4:14.67	Chris Thompson; Michigan	4:14.71	Erik Vendt; USC	4:16.13
1650 freestyle	Chris Thompson; Michigan	14:26.62; US, AR	Tim Siciliano; Michigan	14:41.84	Erik Vendt; USC	14:45.69
100 backstroke	Michael Gilliam; Tennessee	45.97	Peter Marshall; Stanford	46.23	Randall Bal; Stanford	46.59
200 backstroke	Nate Dusing; Texas	1:41.52	Markus Rogan; Stanford	1:41.64	Marc Lindsay; Georgia	1:42.04
100 breaststroke	Brendan Hansen; Texas	52.35	David Denniston; Auburn	52.62	Anthony Robinson; Stanford	52.76
200 breaststroke	Brendan Hansen; Texas	1:53.11; US, AR	David Denniston; Auburn	1:53.48	Kyle Salyards; Georgia	1:56.02
100 butterfly	Ian Crocker; Texas	45.96	Nate Dusing; Texas	46.22	Roland Schoeman; Arizona	46.53
200 butterfly	Adam Messner; Stanford	1:43.12	Duncan Sherrard; Florida	1:43.44	Greg Reeves; Florida	1:44.19
200 IM	Nate Dusing; Texas	1:42.85; US, AR	Tommy Hannan; Texas	1:43.87	Markus Rogan; Stanford	1:44.57
400 IM	Tim Siciliano; Michigan	3:40.77	Erik Vendt; USC	3:40.98	Kevin Clements; Auburn	3:42.90
200 freestyle relay	Stanford; Randall Bal (19.65); Anthony Robinson (18.43); Jeff Guyman (19.36); Bobby O'Bryan (19.04)	1:16.83	Tennessee; Chris Hussey (19.87); Renato Gueraldi (19.09); Jeremy McDonnell (19.31); Michael Gilliam (19.29)	1:17.56	Texas A&M; Matthew Rose (19.82); Riley Janes (19.24); Michael Colligan (19.21); David Morrow (19.36)	1:17.63
400 freestyle relay	Texas; Nate Dusing (42.63); Ian Crocker (42.21); Tommy Hannan (42.55); Jamie Rauch (42.41)	2:49.80; US, AR	California; Matt Macedo (43.27); Maciej Burny (43.86); Scott Greenwood (43.91); Anthony Ervin (41.08)	2:52.12	Arizona; Eric la Fleur (44.14); Roland Schoeman (41.70); Jay Schryver (43.10); Scott Gaskins (44.23)	2:53.17
800 freestyle relay	Texas; Scott Goldblatt (1:34.90); Nate Dusing (1:33.52); Chris Kemp (1:34.41); Jamie Rauch (1:35.17)	6:18.00; US, AR	USC; Jeff Lee (1:36.66); Rodrigo Castro (1:36.40); Tamás Kerékjártó (1:35.63); Klete Keller (1:34.81)	6:23.50	Michigan; Dan Ketchum (1:34.90); Chris Thompson (1:36.23); Garrett Mangieri (1:36.14); Tim Siciliano (1:38.65)	6:25.27
200 medley relay	Texas; Matthew Ulrickson (21.63); Brendan Hansen (23.70); Nate Dusing (20.04); Leffie Crawford (19.10)	1:24.47; US, AR	Tennessee; Michael Gilliam (21.28); Jeremy McDonnell (23.41); Justin Hoggatt (20.76); Renato Gueraldi (19.30)	1:24.75	Auburn; Jonathon Karr (22.35); David Denniston (24.07); Jeffrey Somensatto (20.83); Gregory Busse (19.01)	1:26.26
400 medley relay	Texas; Nate Dusing (45.94); Brendan Hansen (51.48); Tommy Hannan (46.02); Ian Crocker (41.93)	3:05.37; US, AR	Auburn; Jeffrey Somensatto (47.09); David Denniston (51.78); Andy Haidinyak (46.27); Gregory Busse (42.03)	3:07.17	Tennessee; Michael Gilliam (45.63); Jeremy McDonnell (52.05); Justin Hoggatt (46.75); Chris Hussey (43.11)	3:07.54

Legend: US – U.S. Open record; AR – American record;

== Diving results ==
Event	Gold		Silver		Bronze	
1 m diving	Troy Dumais; Texas	397.60	Justin Dumais; Texas Jud Campbell; Georgia	372.25	None awarded	
3 m diving	Troy Dumais; Texas	664.70	Omar Ojeda; Arizona	635.95	Shannon Roy; Tennessee	632.25
Platform diving	Kyle Prandi; Miami	591.75	Justin Dumais; Texas	564.85	Omar Ojeda; Arizona	562.80

== See also ==
- List of college swimming and diving teams
