= 1979 NCAA Division I Swimming and Diving Championships =

American college aquatic sports competition

- Host city: Cleveland, Ohio
- Date(s): March 1979
- Venue(s): CSU Natatorium; Cleveland State University

The 1979 NCAA Men's Division I Swimming and Diving Championships were contested in March 1979 at the Cleveland State University Natatorium at Cleveland State University in Cleveland, Ohio at the 56th annual NCAA-sanctioned swim meet to determine the team and individual national champions of Division I men's collegiate swimming and diving in the United States.

California topped the team standings for the first time, the Golden Bears' inaugural national title.

== Team standings ==
- Note: Top 10 only
- (H) = Hosts
- ^{(DC)} = Defending champions
- Full results

Rank	Team	Points
1st place, gold medalist(s)	California	287
2nd place, silver medalist(s)	USC	227
3rd place, bronze medalist(s)	Florida	224
4	Tennessee ^{(DC)}	221
5	UCLA	197
6	Auburn	160
7	Indiana	104
8	Alabama	90
9	SMU	78
10	Michigan	61

== See also ==
- List of college swimming and diving teams
