= 1978 NCAA Division I Swimming and Diving Championships =

American college aquatic sports competition

- Host city: Long Beach, California
- Date(s): March 1978
- Venue(s): Belmont Plaza Pool; CSU, Long Beach

The 1978 NCAA Men's Division I Swimming and Diving Championships were contested in March 1978 at the Belmont Plaza Pool at California State University, Long Beach in Long Beach, California at the 55th annual NCAA-sanctioned swim meet to determine the team and individual national champions of Division I men's collegiate swimming and diving in the United States.

Tennessee topped the team standings for the first time, the Volunteers' first title in program history.

== Team standings ==
- Note: Top 10 only
- (H) = Hosts
- (DC) = Defending champions
- Full results

Rank	Team	Points
1st place, gold medalist(s)	Tennessee	307
2nd place, silver medalist(s)	Auburn	185
3rd place, bronze medalist(s)	California	179
4	UCLA	165
5	USC (DC)	143
6	Florida	135
7	Alabama	133
8	Long Beach State (H)	115
9	Indiana	107
10	SMU	80

== See also ==
- List of college swimming and diving teams
