= Henry Kozlowski =

American swimmer

Henry A. Kozlowski (b. circa 1923) was an American swimmer who set the world record in the 50 yard freestyle race in 1943, a record which stood for almost 11 years.

Kozlowski was from Chicago and attended Lane Tech high school, where he already proved to be a very fast swimmer, and set a scholastic record in the 100 free.

On March 27, 1943, while swimming for Northwestern University, he broke the world record in the 50 yard freestyle by swimming 22.1 seconds, breaking the 20-year-old record set by Duke Kahanamoku. Before swimming for Northwestern, he briefly attended Ohio State in the fall of 1941 and then attended Illinois University for a semester, before moving to Northwestern. Before leaving Illinois for financial reasons, he was already swimming times in practice to equal or beat the existing records in the 50 and 100 yard freestyle races, and held the national scholastic 100 yard freestyle record of 52.4 records. He also played football for Northwestern in the fall of 1942.

Kozloswki entered the United States Army the month after setting his world record. He indicated in a December 1944 article in a U.S. Army newspaper that he intended to return to college swimming after the war, but it is unclear if he did so. He did swim at an exhibition meet in Wisconsin Dells, Wisconsin in June 1949 where he was billed as the "world's fastest human in water."

Dick Cleveland beat Kozlowski's 50 yard record in early 1954, swimming 21.9 seconds.
