= 1976 NCAA Division I Swimming and Diving Championships =

American college aquatic sports competition

- Host city: Providence, Rhode Island
- Date(s): March 1976
- Venue(s): Smith Swimming Center; Brown University

The 1976 NCAA Men's Division I Swimming and Diving Championships were contested in March 1976 at the Smith Swimming Center at Brown University in Providence, Rhode Island at the 53rd annual NCAA-sanctioned swim meet to determine the team and individual national champions of Division I men's collegiate swimming and diving in the United States.

USC once again topped the team standings, the Trojans' third consecutive title and eighth overall.

== Team standings ==
- Note: Top 10 only
- (H) = Hosts
- (DC) = Defending champions
- Full results

Rank	Team	Points
1st place, gold medalist(s)	USC (DC)	398
2nd place, silver medalist(s)	Tennessee	237
3rd place, bronze medalist(s)	UCLA	213
4	Indiana	199
5	Alabama	135
6	NC State	93
7	SMU	89
8	Auburn	87
9	Miami (FL)	73
10	Stanford	64

== See also ==
- List of college swimming and diving teams
