= James H. Tyers =

English swimmer

Personal information
- Nationality: British
- Height: 5 ft (152 cm) 8 (1895)
- Weight: 169 pds. (1895)

Sport
- Sport: Swimming
- Club: Osborne Swimming Club, Manchester

James H. (Jack) Tyers (born c.1876) was an English swimmer who had great success in the 1890s. He won the English 100-yard and 220-yard championships from 1892 to 1897, and the 440-yard, 500-yard, half-mile, and mile championships from 1893 to 1896.

Tyers first gained widespread attention by 1892 while swimming for the Osborne Swimming Club of Manchester. In December 1895, Outing magazine described Tyers' fast rise to the top of the sport:

Mr. J.H. Tyers of the Osborne Swimming Club, Manchester, first came prominently before the public September 19th, 1892, when, in the Corporation Baths, Vestry street, Leicester, he swam 100 yards with three turns in 1m. 5 4-5s, beating all previous records. Since that evening, although an assiduous competitor, he has never lost a race except when heavily handicapped. The Amateur Swimming Association (of England) schedules seven annual championship races at distances from 100 yards to 5 miles. These are held at different times between June and October. In 1892 Tyers won such of these as were contested after he began to compete; took all seven in 1893; and has now won them all again in 1894. Official swimming statistics credit to Mr. Tyers forty-three English records, ranging from 31 1/2 yards to 5 miles, 200 yards, and all but two of these forty-three are also the world's best records.

Tyers' primary competition included John Derbyshire and John Arthur Jarvis. In 1896, Tyers received a suspension for using "strong language" at a meet. Tyers became a professional in 1898.
