= 1980 NCAA Division I Swimming and Diving Championships =

American college aquatic sports competition

- Host city: Cambridge, Massachusetts
- Date(s): March 1980
- Venue(s): Blodgett Pool; Harvard University

The 1980 NCAA Men's Division I Swimming and Diving Championships were contested in March 1980 at Blodgett Pool at Harvard University in Cambridge, Massachusetts at the 57th annual NCAA-sanctioned swim meet to determine the team and individual national champions of Division I men's collegiate swimming and diving in the United States.

California again topped the team standings, the Golden Bears' second consecutive and second overall title.

== Team standings ==
- Note: Top 10 only
- (H) = Hosts
- ^{(DC)} = Defending champions
- Full results

| Rank | Team | Points |
|---|---|---|
| 1st place, gold medalist(s) | California ^{(DC)} | 234 |
| 2nd place, silver medalist(s) | Texas | 220 |
| 3rd place, bronze medalist(s) | Florida | 200 |
| 4 | UCLA | 192 |
| 5 | Auburn | 168 |
| 6 | USC | 147 |
| 7 | SMU | 137 |
| 8 | Arizona | 97 |
| 9 | Indiana | 77 |
| 10 | Stanford | 69 |

== See also ==
- List of college swimming and diving teams
