= 1994 NCAA Division I Men's Swimming and Diving Championships =

American college aquatic sports competition

1994 NCAA Division I Swimming and Diving Championships
- Host city: Minneapolis, Minnesota
- Date(s): March 1994
- Venue(s): University Aquatic Center; University of Minnesota

The 1994 NCAA Division I Men's Swimming and Diving Championships were contested in March 1994 at the University Aquatic Center at the University of Minnesota in Minneapolis, Minnesota at the 71st annual NCAA-sanctioned swim meet to determine the team and individual national champions of Division I men's collegiate swimming and diving in the United States.

Stanford again topped the team standings, finishing 121.5 points ahead of Texas. It was the Cardinal's third consecutive and seventh overall title and the sixth for coach Skip Kenney.

== Team standings ==
- Note: Top 10 only
- (H) = Hosts
- ^{(DC)} = Defending champions
- Full results

Rank	Team	Points
1st place, gold medalist(s)	Stanford ^{(DC)}	566 1/2
2nd place, silver medalist(s)	Texas	445
3rd place, bronze medalist(s)	Michigan	370
4	Auburn	301 1/2
5	California	242 1/2
6	USC	226 1/2
7	Minnesota (H)	193
8	Florida	171 1/2
9	Tennessee	150 1/2
10	Alabama; SMU	146

== See also ==
- List of college swimming and diving teams
