= Tom Wilkens =

American swimmer (born 1975)

Personal information
- Full name: Thomas Peter Wilkens
- Nickname: "Tom"
- National team: United States
- Born: November 25, 1975 (age 50) Middletown Township, New Jersey, U.S.
- Occupations: Insurance, public service, swim coach
- Height: 6 ft 2 in (1.88 m)
- Weight: 181 lb (82 kg)
- Spouse: Stephanie Gayle Lawlor
- Children: Daughter Kasey, son Bryce

Sport
- Sport: Swimming
- Strokes: Individual Medley, Breaststroke, Butterfly
- Club: Red Bank YMCA, New Jersey; Santa Clara Swim Club
- College team: Stanford University
- Coach: Mark Riker (Red Bank YMCA); Mike Sullivan (Christian Brothers Academy); Skip Kenney (Stanford); Dick Jochums (Santa Clara SC)
Medal record
Men's swimming
Representing the United States
Olympic Games
Bronze medal – third place	2000 Sydney	200 m medley
World Championships (LC)
Silver medal – second place	2001 Fukuoka	200 m medley
Bronze medal – third place	2001 Fukuoka	400 m medley
World Championships (SC)
Gold medal – first place	2002 Moscow	400 m medley
Bronze medal – third place	2002 Moscow	200 m medley
Pan Pacific Championships
Gold medal – first place	1999 Sydney	200 m medley
Silver medal – second place	1999 Sydney	200 m breaststroke
Bronze medal – third place	1997 Fukuoka	200 m breaststroke
Bronze medal – third place	1999 Sydney	400 m medley
Bronze medal – third place	2002 Yokohama	200 m medley
Summer Universiade
Gold medal – first place	1995 Fukuoka	200 m medley

Tom Wilkens

Councilman, Middletown Township Committee, NJ

Personal details
- Party: Republican

Thomas Peter Wilkens (born November 25, 1975) is an American former competitive swimmer who competed for Stanford University and was a 2000 Sydney Olympic bronze medalist in the men's 200-meter individual medley. After retiring from swimming around 2004, he had a career in insurance with AIG and McGowan Insurance, and served as a Middletown Township committee member in his hometown. He coached swimming with Greater Monmouth County's YMCA beginning in 2016, and later at Fordham University beginning in 2023.

== Early life and swimming ==
Wilkens was born November 25, 1975, in Middletown Township, New Jersey to father Peter, a Viet Nam veteran, and mother Laney Wilkens. Growing up in Middletown Township, he began swimming around eight, training and competing first at the Middletown Swim and Tennis Club, and later for the nearby Red Bank YMCA, where he was coached by Mark Riker. In YMCA competition, he was a three-time national champion.

=== Christian Brothers Academy ===
Graduating in 1994, he attended Christian Brothers Academy (CBA) in Lincroft, New Jersey, near his native Middletown Township. Representing the Christian Brothers Colts, Wilkens swam for Coach Mike Sullivan and gained recognition as one of the top high school swimmers in New Jersey. Consistently dominant in their region, the CBA Colts swim team won the Shore Conference Championship all four years of Wilkens's tenure with the team and continued winning the regional meet in consecutive years through 2020. Wilkens began swimming with the CBA team from their inaugural year in 1991 through 1994, earning All-American honors and state titles. Recognized by the National Interscholastic Swim Coaches Association (NISCA) during his Senior year in 1994, Wilkens became an All American in the 200-yard Individual Medley and the 100-yard butterfly, having set New Jersey state records in both events. His dominance at the state level earned him a place on the Stanford University swim team, a perennial powerhouse in collegiate swimming. Though recognized widely at the state level, Wilkens did not receive an athletic scholarship to Stanford.

== Stanford University ==
Enrolling at Stanford University around the Fall of 1994, and graduating with a degree in Political Science in the Spring of 1998, Wilkens was a key contributor to the Cardinal swim team under Hall of Fame Head Coach Skip Kenney. He helped lead Stanford to the NCAA team championship at Auburn University in March, 1998, where he won three events. Wilkens was also instrumental in leading Stanford to NCAA championship runner-up finishes in 1995 in Indianapolis where they placed second in team competition to the University of Michigan and in 1997 in Minneapolis where they placed second to Auburn University. Wilkens was one of only three swimmers in Stanford collegiate history to capture three NCAA championship titles in the same season.

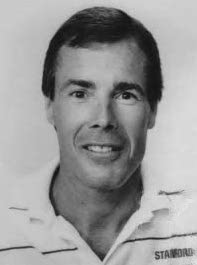
Stanford Coach Skip Kenney, 1988

Individually, Wilkens captured five NCAA national titles: the 400-yard individual medley in 1997, the 200-yard breaststroke in 1998, the 200 and 400 individual medleys in 1998, and the 400-yard medley relay in 1998. Wilkins was a Pac-10 champion ten times during his collegiate years, and between 1995 and 1998 led the Stanford Swim team to four Pac-10 team titles. He was a sixteen-time All-American at Stanford, where he earned national recognition as one of the top medley and breaststroke swimmers in the country.

=== Santa Clara swim club ===
By August 1998, he trained with the competitive program at the Santa Clara Swim Club under Head Coach Dick Jochums in Santa Clara, continuing to swim there intermittently through the end of his career in 2004. Jochums, who had competed in the 200 Individual Medley as a collegiate swimmer at Washington University in St. Louis, later became known for coaching medley and stroke specialists.

=== International competition ===
In elite international competition, Wilkens was highly accomplished, winning 10 medals, including three golds in medley competition from 1995 to 2002. As shown under Medal Record in the information box above, Wilkens captured a silver in the 200 IM at the World Aquatic Championships in Fukuoka, Japan in 2001, as well as a bronze in the 400 IM. At the 2002 World Championships in Moscow in the short-course competition, he was a recipient of a gold medal in the 400 IM, setting an American record. Wilkens participated in the 2002, 1999, and 1997 Pan Pacific Championships winning a total of five medals with two in 200-meter breaststroke, and three in either 200 or 400-meter medley competition. In one of his best competitions in the 1999 Pan Pacifics in Sydney, Australia, Wilkens won a gold in the 200 IM, a silver medal in the 200-meter breaststroke, and a bronze medal in the 400-meter medley. Wilkins also earned medals at the Goodwill Games, and the U.S. Open.

At the U.S. Olympic swimming trials in Indianapolis in August, 2000, he made the team in the 200-individual medley and breaststroke events. Though he was leading through the first 300 meters, and was rated as the world's top 400 Individual medley swimmer, he placed third in the 400-meter individual medley, and did not qualify to compete for the U.S. Olympic team in the event.

Continuing to swim after the Olympics, Tom continued to serve as Captain of the US swim team through 2003, continuing to compete at an elite world level. He retired from elite competition around 2003, returning to his hometown of Middletown Township in 2004.

== 2000 Sydney Olympic bronze ==
Wilkens represented the United States at the 2000 Summer Olympics in Sydney, Australia, serving as team captain. He received a bronze medal for his third-place performance in the men's 200-meter individual medley, edging out 1996 Olympic gold medalist Atilla Crenze of Hungary, who placed fourth. Wilkens finished in 2:00.87, a noteworthy time only a few seconds off the former Olympic record, and only .2 seconds over his personal best.

He also competed in the preliminary heats of the men's 200-meter breaststroke, but did not advance to the finals. Wilkens finished 21st overall with a time of 2:16.30, placing fifth in the fifth preliminary heat.

On his return to New Jersey, a parade was held in Wilkens's honor. One of the attendees at the parade was fellow New Jerseyan Connor Jaeger, a future 2016 Olympic silver medalist in the 1500 meter swim.

=== In Media ===
Wilkins was one of the featured swimmers in P.H. Mullen Jr.'s book Gold in the Water: The True Story of Ordinary Men and Their Extraordinary Dream of Olympic Glory. The book chronicles Wilken's and several other swimmers journey to the 2000 Sydney Olympics, and their training experience with the Santa Clara Swim Club. Wilkens was also part of the 15-minute documentary from 2021, "The Water is My Sky", which described the challenges of the Olympic swimming experience and the Olympic swimming trials, directed by Tommy Haines and Brian Tremml. The documentary included coverage from Wilkens's former Santa Clara Swim Club Coach, Dick Jochums. It centered on the Olympic journeys of Wilkens, and two other Olympic swimmers with commentary from 1984 Olympic swimming gold medalist Rowdy Gaines. The documentary also includes coverage of 2016 Olympic silver medalist in the 1500 freestyle and New Jersey native Connor Jaeger. Wilkens was also featured in the 2000 broadcast television mini-series, "Sydney 2000, Games of the XXVII Olympiad", which consisted of former television coverage of the 2000 Sydney Olympics.

=== Honors ===
In 2023, Wilkens was inducted into the Stanford Athletics Hall of Fame in recognition of his contributions to the university's swimming program. As a result of his outstanding collegiate career, he was made one of only 26 swimmers who were recognized as a member of the Pac-10 All-Century Swim Team. In 1998, in his Senior year at Stanford, he was named Athlete of the Year in swimming by the Jersey Shore Sports Hall of Fame. Wilkins was a recipient of the Kipputh Award in four years, an honor bestowed on the swimmer with the highest point total at the U.S. National Championships. Wilkens was honored as a member of the Athletics Ring of Champions by the athletics department of his alma mater, Christian Brothers Academy.

== Post-swimming careers ==
Following his retirement from competitive swimming around 2023, Wilkens moved back to Middletown Township and stayed active in his local community. He served in the insurance industry in New Jersey first with AIG, and then as a Director and Branch Manager with McGowan Insurance. He has served with the Association Board of the New Jersey Professional Insurance Agents.

=== Public service ===
Extending his career into civic service, he has served as a Republican on the Township Committee of his hometown, Middletown Township, New Jersey. The Township Committee serves as the governing body of Middletown Township, with members elected at-large in partisan elections to three-year terms on a staggered basis. At the annual reorganization meeting, the Committee selects one of its members to serve as Mayor and another as Deputy Mayor, each for a one-year term. Wilkens' elections have marked his continued commitment to public service and local governance. According to one source, the Observer Online, Wilkens may have served a brief term as a Mayor of Middletown Township.

=== Swim coaching ===
Beginning in 2016, Wilkins was a club coach with certification from USA swimming and worked with the YMCA of Greater Monmouth County. The age group levels he coached included 11-12 levels up to National Team age. An accomplished program, Monmouth County Swimmers have become Division I level collegiate competitors, and included YMCA National Champions, and several who qualified for the Olympic trials. Wilkens has also coached for his former team, the Red Oak YMCA.

In 2024, Wilkens served as a short-term swimming coach with Fordham University for the 2023–24 season, and became Head Coach in the 2024–2025 season.

He has resided in New Jersey with Stephanie, his wife, daughter Kasey and son Bryce. Bryce Wilkens swam for Fordham University and was a 2023 graduate of Christian Brothers Academy.

== See also ==
- 1998 NCAA Division I National Swimming Championship, Stanford University
- List of Olympic medalists in swimming (men)
- List of Stanford University people
- List of World Aquatics Championships medalists in swimming (men)
