= 1962 NCAA swimming and diving championships =

American college aquatic sports competition

- Host city: Columbus, Ohio
- Date(s): March 1962
- Venue(s): Ohio State Natatorium; Ohio State University
- Teams: 27
- Events: 16

The 1962 NCAA swimming and diving championships were contested at the 26th annual championship swim meet sanctioned and hosted by the NCAA to determine the individual and team national champions of men's collegiate swimming and diving among its Division I member programs in the United States, culminating the 1961–62 NCAA swimming and diving season.

These championships were hosted by Ohio State University at the Ohio State Natatorium in Columbus, Ohio during March 1962.

Hosts Ohio State finished forty-six points ahead of USC in the team championship standings, the Buckeyes' eleventh national title.

== Team standings ==
- (H) = Hosts
- (DC) = Defending champions
- Italics = Debut appearance

Rank	Team	Points
1st place, gold medalist(s)	Ohio State (H)	92
2nd place, silver medalist(s)	USC	46
3rd place, bronze medalist(s)	Minnesota	41 1/2
4	Michigan	32
5	Princeton	29
6	Michigan State	20
7	Cincinnati	19
8	Yale	18
9	SMU	14 1/2
10	Illinois	11
11	Villanova	10
12	Purdue	9
13	Harvard	8
13	North Carolina	8
13	NC State	8
16	Denver	5
16	Oklahoma	5
18	Navy	4
19	Florida State	3
19	Southern Illinois	3
21	Bowling Green State	2
21	Iowa	2
21	Washington	2
24	Florida	1
24	Kenyon	1
24	Texas	1
24	Utah	1

== Individual events ==
=== Swimming ===
Event	Champion	Team	Time
50 yard freestyle	Steven Jackman	Minnesota	21.1
100 yard freestyle	Steven Jackman (DC)	Minnesota	47.5
220 yard freestyle	Jim Spreitzer	Illinois	2:00.9
440 yard freestyle	(Australia) Murray Rose (DC)	USC	4:20.0
1,500 meter freestyle	(Australia) Murray Rose (DC)	USC	17:26.7
100 yard backstroke	L.B. Schaefer	Ohio State	53.9
200 yard backstroke	Virgil Luken	Minnesota	2:16.8
100 yard breaststroke	Richard Nelson (DC)	Michigan	1:01.7
200 yard breaststroke	Ron Clark (DC)	Michigan	2:13.4
100 yard butterfly	Ed Spencer	NC State	52.5
200 yard butterfly	Artie Wolfe	Ohio State	1:58.0
200 yard individual medley	Harley Mull	Ohio State	2:02.3
400 yard freestyle relay	Jeff Mattson; Doug Rowe; William Wood; Mike Wood	Michigan State	3:15.8
400 yard medley relay	L.B. Schaefer; Tom Kovacs; Artie Wolfe; John Plain	Ohio State (DC)	3:37.6

=== Diving ===
Event	Champion	Team	Score
1 meter diving	Lou Vitucci	Ohio State	470.50
3 meter diving	Lou Vitucci (DC)	Ohio State	491.65

== See also ==
- 1962 NAIA swimming and diving championships
- List of college swimming and diving teams
