= John Trembley =

American swimmer

Biographical details
- Born: October 23, 1952 (age 74); Schenectady, New York
- Education: University of Tennessee

Playing career
- 1970–1974: University of Tennessee
- Positions: freestyle, butterfly

Coaching career (HC unless noted)
- 1975: University of Tennessee (Student Asst. Coach)
- 1977–1978: Knoxville Swim Assoc.
- 1975–1979: University of Tennessee (Asst. Coach)
- 1980–1988: Mercersburg Academy Swimming; Mercersburg, PA.
- 1988–2012: University of Tennessee

Head coaching record
- Overall: 282–65 .815 Winning Pct. (Tennessee); 95–2 (Mercersburg Academy)

Accomplishments and honors

Championships
- 1 NCAA Championship ('78–79); 2 SEC Championships ('89, '96) (Tennessee Coach)

Awards
- 6 x SEC Coach of the Year; 9 time All-American Swimmer

John Trembley is an American former All-American competition swimmer for the University of Tennessee, and swim coach. After a highly successful swimming career with Tennessee under coach Ray Bussard, Trembley coached the University of Tennessee Volunteers for 23 years from 1989–2012, leading the team to two SEC Championships.

Trembley was born in Schenectady, New York, to John and Doris Senelt Trembley on October 23, 1952, lived in Connecticut, and moved to the Loudonville, New York area around 1964 where he would attend Shaker High School in Latham, N.Y. John Trembley Sr. was a Vice-President of W.T. Rose and Associates in Cohoes, New York, and both John Jr.'s parents had been avid swimmers. John Jr. began swimming competitively around age 8, and by his eighth grade year at Shaker Jr. High was already nationally ranked by the AAU in his age group. At Shaker, he swam for Coach Roger Bell on the Freshman swim team, while he was in eighth grade. During his early swimming years, he also received instruction from Hartford, Connecticut's Trinity College Coach Robert Slaughter. In the 11–12 year old age group, he was nationally ranked by the AAU in the 50-yard butterfly with a 27.3 seconds, third in the 50-meter butterfly with a time of :31 seconds, and fourth in the 50-yard backstroke with a time of :30 seconds.

In his High School Senior year at Shaker, Trembley became one of America's top college swimming prospects. Competition for Trembley set off a highly contested recruiting war between Indiana's "Doc" James Counsilman, and Tennessee's legendary coach Ray Bussard. Trembley was an exceptional young sprinter, clocking a time of 20.5 in the 50-yard freestyle while in High School, and like his contemporary Mark Spitz, was also exceptional in butterfly, setting a new state record time in the 100-yard event of 53.3 in his age group prior to the New York State Swim Meet in March 1969.

== Collegiate competition ==
Trembley attended the University of Tennessee from around 1970–1975, where he was voted an All-American nine times. His swimming years were from 1970–1974, and he was mentored by Hall of Fame Coach Ray Bussard. In his Junior year, he was a member of the parachuting club and he completed his degree with a B.A. in Philosophy in 1975. One of his early Tennessee swim mates was Olympian David Edgar, and the two standouts greatly enhanced the team's success. In 1973, he gained national recognition when he became the first swimmer to capture five events at the NCAA championships which included the 500 and 100 free, 100 fly, and both 400 free and 400 medley relays. He won five individual NCAA titles between 1973–74, with two in the 50 freestyle, two in the 100 butterfly, and one in 100 freestyle, and swam in four NCAA-winning relays, which included the two times in the 400 medley relay and twice in the 400 freestyle relay. He won the 50 freestyle and the 100 butterfly in SEC championships between 1971–1973. At the NCAA Championships in March, 1973, Trembley came within a second of Mark Spitz's 100-meter American butterfly record with his time of :48.68. In his swimming career, he set three American records. In the summer of 1976, he was injured in a touch football game resulting in a blood clot in his rear carotid artery in his brain and six weeks of hospitalization, ending his chances of competing in the 1976 Olympic trials and hopes of becoming an Olympic competitor.

== Early swim coach positions ==
From around 1975–1979, Trembley served for a few years as an Assistant Coach at University of Tennessee after his college graduation in 1975. Prior to serving as Head Coach at Tennessee, Trembley coached eight years at Mercersburg, Academy in Mercersburg, PA, from 1980–1988, where he won six National Prep Titles, and six Eastern Prep Titles, as ranked by the National Interscholastic Swim Coaches Association, or Swimming World Magazine ratings. He obtained an impressive dual meet record at Mercersburg of 95–2.

Trembley coached Olympians Richard Saeger, Melvin Stewart, and Betsy Mitchell, at Mercersburg Academy. While at University of Tennessee, two of his swimmers, Jeremy Linn, and Tripp Schwenk also went on to be Olympic competitors.

=== University of Tennessee Coach ===
During Trembley's reign as Tennessee Swimming Head Coach from 1988–2012, the team won two Southeastern Conference (SEC) Championships in 1989 and 1996. As a high point, while serving as an Assistant Coach at Tennessee from 1978–79, the team became the first in the Southeastern Conference to win an NCAA championship. Trembley's 2001 team finished second in the SEC, and placed third at the NCAA championships, in one of the best years in his coaching tenure. In his last season as coach in 2012, the Tennessee Vol Men Swimmers finished 12th at the NCAA Championships. During Trembley's time at Tennessee, including his four years as a swimmer 1971–1974, and his 23 years as a Coach, the men's program had 19 Olympic swimmers. His overall record at Tennessee included 282 wins and 65 losses, for a winning percentage of .813, second only to his predecessor at Tennessee, Hall of Fame Coach Ray Bussard. Trembley married Joanne Hogan, who he met while attending Tennessee, and had three children.

Trembley was released as Coach in January 2012 for what Athletic Director Dave Hart termed "gross misconduct" related to his use of e-mails, and though "financial improprieties" were also investigated, they were ruled unfounded by the Knoxville Police Department after an investigation.

== See also ==
Tennessee Volunteers men's swimming and diving
