= 1991 NCAA Division I Men's Swimming and Diving Championships =

American college aquatic sports competition

1991 NCAA Division I Swimming and Diving Championships
- Host city: Austin, Texas
- Date(s): March 1991
- Venue(s): Texas Swimming Center; University of Texas

The 1991 NCAA Division I Men's Swimming and Diving Championships were contested in March 1991 at the Texas Swimming Center at the University of Texas in Austin, Texas at the 68th annual NCAA-sanctioned swim meet to determine the team and individual national champions of Division I men's collegiate swimming and diving in the United States.

Hosts Texas topped the team standings, the Longhorns' fourth consecutive and fifth overall men's title.

== Team standings ==
- Note: Top 10 only
- (H) = Hosts
- ^{(DC)} = Defending champions
- Full results

Rank	Team	Points
1st place, gold medalist(s)	Texas ^{(DC)} (H)	476
2nd place, silver medalist(s)	Stanford	420
3rd place, bronze medalist(s)	Florida	313
4	USC	312 1/2
5	Tennessee	249
6	Michigan	245 1/2
7	Arizona	195
8	SMU	183
9	Arizona State	179
10	UCLA	168

== See also ==
- List of college swimming and diving teams
