= 1984 NCAA Division I Men's Swimming and Diving Championships =

American college aquatic sports competition

1984 NCAA Division I Swimming and Diving Championships
- Host city: Cleveland, Ohio
- Date(s): March 1984
- Venue(s): CSU Natatorium; Cleveland State University

The 1984 NCAA Division I Men's Swimming and Diving Championships were contested in March 1984 at the CSU Natatorium at Cleveland State University in Cleveland, Ohio at the 61st annual NCAA-sanctioned swim meet to determine the team and individual national champions of Division I men's collegiate swimming and diving in the United States. The men's and women's titles would not be held at the same site until 2006.

Florida again topped the team standings, the Gators' second men's title.

== Team standings ==
- Note: Top 10 only
- (H) = Hosts
- ^{(DC)} = Defending champions
- Full results

| Rank | Team | Points |
|---|---|---|
| 1st place, gold medalist(s) | Florida ^{(DC)} | 287 1/2 |
| 2nd place, silver medalist(s) | Texas | 277 |
| 3rd place, bronze medalist(s) | Stanford | 201 |
| 4 | UCLA | 176 1/2 |
| 5 | SMU | 164 |
| 6 | California | 115 |
| 7 | Arizona State | 101 |
| 8 | Auburn | 88 1/2 |
| 9 | Arizona | 87 |
| 10 | Miami (FL) | 80 1/2 |

== See also ==
- List of college swimming and diving teams
