= Steve Jackman =

American swimmer and radiologist (1941–2024)

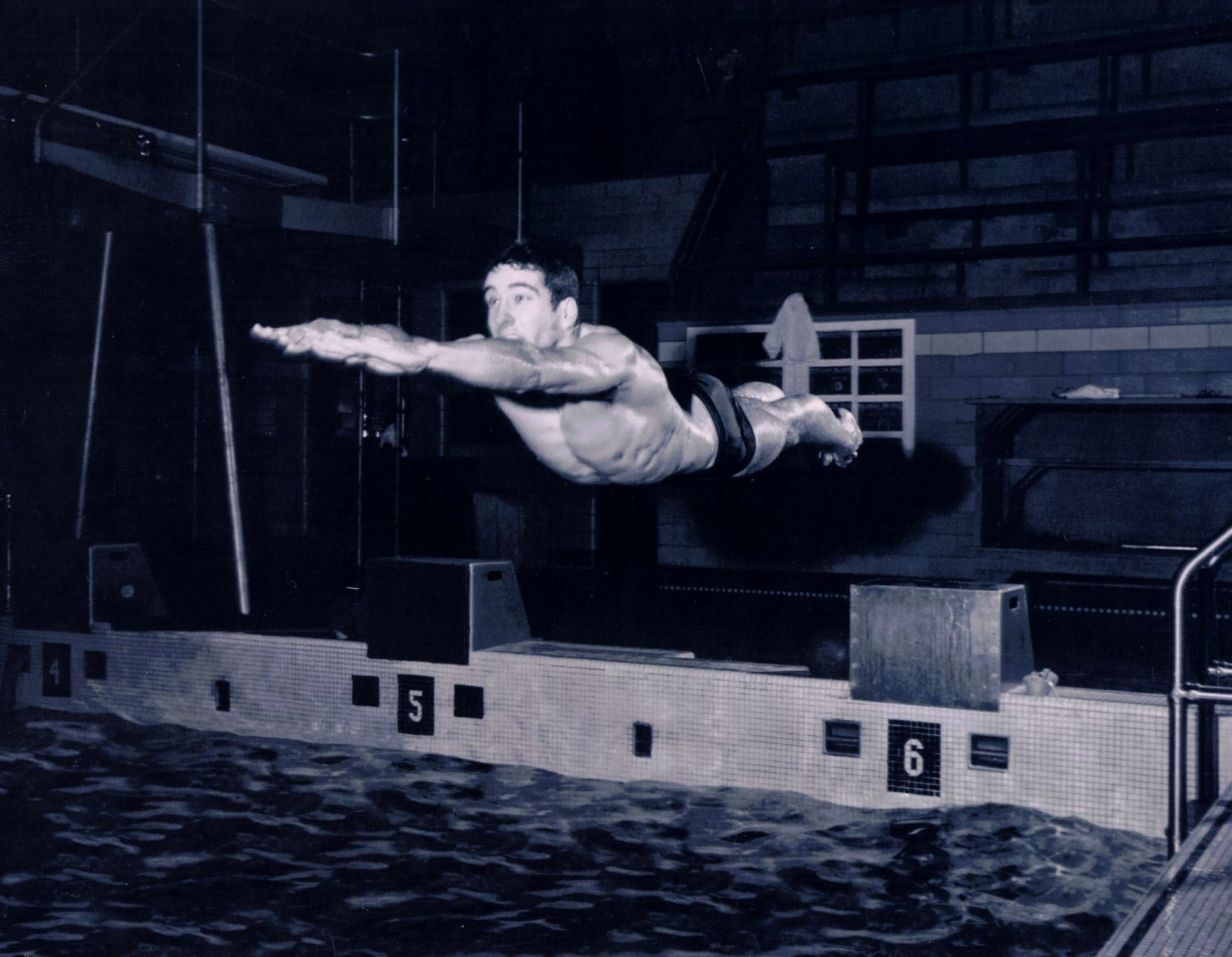

Personal information
- Nationality: American
- Born: 1941 Rochester, Minnesota, U.S.
- Died: June 14, 2024 Augusta, Georgia, U.S.
- Occupation: Radiologist
- Spouse: Jane Lloyd Jackman

Sport
- Sport: Swimming
- Strokes: Freestyle
- Club: Minnesota Golden Gophers

Steve Jackman (1941 – June 14, 2024) was an American competitive swimmer and radiologist. Swimming for the University of Minnesota Golden Gophers, he was the 1961 NCAA champion in the 100-yard freestyle, a title he won while setting a U.S. record, and was dubbed the "Fastest Man in the World" after his short-course sprint victories. He later became a physician, practicing radiology and serving with the U.S. Office of Naval Research on Project Tektite, an early undersea research program.

== Early life ==
Jackman grew up in Rochester, Minnesota, where he swam for Rochester's John Marshall High School, graduating in 1959 after winning three Minnesota state high school swimming titles.

== Swimming career ==
Jackman swam for the University of Minnesota from 1961 to 1963 and was an 11-time All-American. He won six NCAA titles – four individual and two relay – along with eight Big Ten gold medals.

At the 1961 NCAA Championships, Jackman won the 100-yard freestyle in a time that also set a U.S. record. He broke the 50-yard freestyle record in March 1961, and, because the event was not contested internationally or at the Olympics until 1988, was informally recognized as the "fastest man in the world" and listed in the Guinness Book of World Records. He lowered his own 50-yard freestyle mark again in 1962 – twice on the same day – and once more in March 1963, winning the NCAA title in the event in both 1962 and 1963. He also won the NCAA 100-yard freestyle title in 1961 (48.5) and 1962 (47.5). At the 1962 NCAA Championships, hosted by Ohio State University in Columbus, Ohio, Jackman's individual victory was among the meet's featured performances, alongside those of Ohio State's Louis Schaefer, Louis Vitucci, and Murray Rose. He also anchored Minnesota's NCAA champion 400-yard freestyle relay team in 1962 and its NCAA champion 400-yard medley relay team in 1963.

At the U.S. national championships, Jackman placed fifth in the 100-meter freestyle in 1961 and won the event in 1962. He was part of Minnesota's bronze-medal 4×100-meter medley relay team at the 1963 national championships, and, at the 1964 national championships, helped Minnesota win the 4×100-meter freestyle relay and take silver in the 4×200-meter freestyle relay.

Internationally, Jackman won a silver medal in the 100-meter freestyle at the 1963 Pan American Games in São Paulo, Brazil, finishing one-tenth of a second behind the gold medalist. He also set a Japanese national record in the 100-meter freestyle at a national swim meet in Fukuoka, Japan, in 1962. He trained with the U.S. national team ahead of the 1964 Tokyo Olympics but did not qualify for the Olympic team.

In recognition of his collegiate career, Jackman was inducted into the University of Minnesota Aquatics Hall of Fame in 1986 and the Gophers "M" Club (Men's Sports) Hall of Fame in 1991. He was inducted into the Rochester Quarterbacks Club Hall of Fame in 1994. In 2021, the College Swimming & Diving Coaches Association (CSCAA) named him one of the "100 Greatest Men's Swimmers & Divers" of the past century.

== Medical career ==
Jackman graduated from the University of Minnesota Medical School in 1968. He then served with the United States Office of Naval Research as a physician for the Project Tektite habitat in the U.S. Virgin Islands, the United States' first nationally sponsored scientists-in-the-sea program, which placed marine researchers in an underwater habitat in Great Lameshur Bay off St. John. He also served in the U.S. Public Health Service in Houston, Texas.

Jackman went on to practice radiology at the Mayo Clinic in Rochester, Minnesota, and at Memorial Medical Center in Springfield, Illinois, and served as an Associate Clinical Professor of Radiology at the Southern Illinois University School of Medicine.

== Death ==
Jackman died on June 14, 2024, in Augusta, Georgia, at age 83.

== See also ==
- Minnesota Golden Gophers men's swimming and diving
