= 1993 NCAA Division I Men's Swimming and Diving Championships =

American college aquatic sports competition

1993 NCAA Division I Swimming and Diving Championships
- Host city: Indianapolis, Indiana
- Date: March 1993
- Venue(s): Indiana University Natatorium; Indiana University

The 1993 NCAA Division I Men's Swimming and Diving Championships were contested in March 1993 at the Indiana University Natatorium in Indianapolis, Indiana at the 70th annual NCAA-sanctioned swim meet to determine the team and individual national champions of Division I men's collegiate swimming and diving in the United States. The men's and women's titles would not be held at the same site until 2006.

Stanford again topped the team standings, finishing 124.5 points ahead of Michigan. It was the Cardinal's second consecutive and sixth overall title and the fifth for coach Skip Kenney.

== Team standings ==
- Note: Top 10 only
- (H) = Hosts
- ^{(DC)} = Defending champions
- Full results

Rank	Team	Points
1st place, gold medalist(s)	Stanford ^{(DC)}	520 1/2
2nd place, silver medalist(s)	Michigan	396
3rd place, bronze medalist(s)	Texas	326
4	Arizona	263
5	UCLA	260
6	Auburn	215
7	California	175
8	Tennessee	170
9	Florida	157 1/2
10	SMU	148 1/2

== See also ==
- List of college swimming and diving teams
