= Ray Bussard =

American swimming coach (1928–2010)

- Bussard Official UT Headshot

Biographical details
- Born: August 12, 1928; Highland County, Virginia, U.S.
- Died: September 22, 2010 (aged 82); Knoxville, Tennessee, U.S.
- Education: Bridgewater College

Playing career
- Positions: Track and Field; Basketball; Football

Coaching career (HC unless noted)
- 1960-1966: Chattanooga Swim League
- 1968-1989: University of Tennessee; Swimming Team

Head coaching record
- Overall: 252-30 dual meet record Percentage - .926 (Overall); 178-20 dual meet record Percentage - .898 (Tennessee)

Accomplishments and honors

Championships
- NCAA Swimming Championship 1978; Eight SEC Championships '69, '72-'79

Awards
- NCAA Coach of the Year '72, '78; Swim Coaches Hall of Fame 2008; International Swim. Hall of Fame

Ray Bussard (August 12, 1928 – September 22, 2010) was a Hall of Fame collegiate and Olympic swimming coach from the United States, best known for coaching the University of Tennessee Swimming team from 1968-1989. A specialist in developing sprinters, his overall career winning percentage in dual meets was .926, an unprecedented achievement. Earlier, he had been a gifted collegiate athlete at Bridgewater College and had coached field sports in Tennessee and Virginia High Schools.

== Education and collegiate athletics ==
At age six, Bussard started swimming in a creek bed near his home in rural Virginia, but he showed a far greater interest in field sports. At Virginia's Bridgewater College, he was a track and field National AAU All-Around Champion in 1952, and was All-State playing football. In basketball, he was an all-tourney selection.

== Early coaching ==
After graduating college Ray coached at 5 high schools in Virginia, coaching boys and girls track and field, football and baseball. He also coached at Chattanooga and Red Bank High schools in Chattanooga, Tennessee. He won more than three dozen state and regional titles coaching. His overall record for high school coaching was 43-24-12 in football, 241-99 in basketball, 128-52 in baseball, and 172-7 in track and field.

During the summertime, Ray began teaching swimming and life-saving courses for the Red Cross, where he started his career as a swim coach. He founded the Chattanooga Swim League in 1960 and coached it through 1966. He met his wife Ruth Cauley while teaching and coaching in Craigsville, Virginia, the first of five Virginia high schools where he would coach.

== University of Tennessee swimming coach ==
In the winter of 1966, the University of Tennessee invited him to interview for the position as Head Swim Coach. He took the position as Coach and administrator for recreational swimming on Feb. 1, 1967. Bussard coached the men's swimming team at the University of Tennessee for 21 seasons, from 1968-1989.

When he began at the school, Tennessee had not competed in swimming at the NCAA level since 1959. Showing immediate results, after only one year of coaching, in 1969 Tennessee's Swim team won the Southeastern Conference Championship, edging out the University of Florida who had won the conference thirteen straight times. Bussard won the 1969 SEC Championship with a team composed entirely of Freshmen, but he may have preferred younger minds to teach his innovative approach. From 1973-1978, his Diving Coach was Vince Panzano, a former diver and future diving coach for Ohio State, who claims he learned a great deal from observing Bussard, who would have nine undefeated seasons coaching the Vols. Bussard gained support for the team by adding tradition and ritual to meets, having team members wear coonskin caps, emptying a bottle of Tennessee swim water into an opponent's pool, and adding spirit by featuring the swim team's cheerleaders, the Vol Timettes.

== Coaching focus ==
Ray's specialty as a swim coach was in developing sprinters. He defined sprinting as controlled quickness, stressing fast turns and starts, which made his swimmers difficult to beat in short distance events, and short course pools. His flip-turns were such a unique and precise innovation, they became known as "Tennessee turns". Though he believed in thorough practices, he focused more on technique than overdistance training alone which was becoming more popular in the 1970s. Team building was a focus, and he cared greatly about details, encouraging his swimmers to shave their heads before important meets.

While at Tennessee, he was twice named the NCAA's Swimming Coach of the Year (1972 and 1978), and his Volunteers won the NCAA Swimming Championships in 1978. His University of Tennessee teams completed a 178–20 record during his coaching years. When including his high school coaching, his overall career record was a 252–30 in dual meets with a particularly noteworthy winning percentage of .926. His most accomplished swimmers included two-time 1976 gold medalist Matt Vogel, and 1975 two-time World Championship gold medalist Andy Coan. He also coached 1972 gold medalist David Edgar and his successor as Tennessee Coach, All American John Trembley, who were both exceptional sprinters.

Bussard served as a coach for the US at the 1984 Los Angeles Olympics, where he was a sprint coach, and 1979 and 1983 Pan American Games as well as the 1979 Pan Pacific Games.

== Honors ==
He was inducted into the International Swimming Hall of Fame as an Honor Coach in 1999, and into the American Swimming Coaches Association's Hall of Fame in 2008. In 2000, Bussard was inducted into the Virginia Sports Hall of Fame. He was also a member of the Tennessee Swimming Hall of Fame, which he had established himself, the Tennessee Sports Hall of Fame, the Knoxville Sports Hall of Fame and the Bridgewater College Sports Hall of Fame.

According to a leading Knoxville newspaper, by 1985, Bussard had coached more than 35 coaches and athletic directors.

In 1989, the year of his retirement as coach, the University of Tennessee Indoor Aquatic Pool was named for Bussard to honor his legacy.

Bussard died on September 22, 2010, at Fort Sanders Regional Medical Center in Knoxville. He had suffered from Diabetes, which had worsened in the six months before his death.

== See also ==
- List of members of the International Swimming Hall of Fame
