= 1974 NCAA Division I swimming and diving championships =

American college aquatic sports competition

1974 NCAA Division I Swimming and Diving Championships
- Host city: Long Beach, California
- Date(s): March 1974
- Venue(s): Belmont Plaza Pool; California State University, Long Beach

The 1974 NCAA Men's Division I Swimming and Diving Championships were contested in March 1974 at the Belmont Plaza Pool at California State University, Long Beach in Long Beach, California at the 51st annual NCAA-sanctioned swim meet to determine the team and individual national champions of Division I men's collegiate swimming and diving in the United States.

This was the first championship after the NCAA renamed the former University Division to the present Division I.

USC returned to the top the team standings (after having finished second to Indiana each of the previous four years), the Trojans' sixth overall title (and first since 1966).

== Team standings ==
- Note: Top 10 only
- (H) = Hosts
- (DC) = Defending champions
- Full results

Rank	Team	Points
1st place, gold medalist(s)	USC	339
2nd place, silver medalist(s)	Indiana (DC)	338
3rd place, bronze medalist(s)	Tennessee	240
4	Washington	214
5	UCLA	190
6	Stanford	101
7	NC State	84
8	Ohio State	61
9	Miami (FL)	58
10	Florida; New Mexico	47

== See also ==
- List of college swimming and diving teams
