= Sabir Muhammad =

American swimmer

Personal information
- Full name: Sabir K. Muhammad
- National team: United States
- Born: {} Louisville, Kentucky, U.S.

Sport
- Sport: Swimming
Medal record
Men's swimming
Representing the United States
Event	1st	2nd	3rd
World Championships (25 m)	0	1	1
Total	0	1	1
World Championships (25 m)
Silver medal – second place	2000 Athens	4×100 m freestyle
Bronze medal – third place	2000 Athens	50 m butterfly

Sabir K. Muhammad (born in Louisville) is an American swimmer. He represented the United States in international competition as a butterfly and freestyle swimmer. Muhammad graduated from Stanford University in 1998. Muhammad finished his collegiate career with 7 Pac-10 championship titles, 25 All-American honors and 3 NCAA, US Open and American Records. Muhammad graduated from Stanford as an Academic All-American with a degree in International Relations. Muhammad holds an MBA from Goizueta Business School at Emory University. In 2000, he competed in the Short Course World Championships held in Athens, Greece winning both silver and bronze medals. At those world championships, Muhammad became the first African-American to win a medal at a major international swimming competition. He has broken a total of 10 American Records in his career. He is a two-time Short Course World Championship medalist, a four-time US Open champion, a five-time World Cup Swimming champion and a two-time runner-up at US Nationals.

Muhammad has been an advocate for swimming in multicultural communities for nearly 15 years. In 2003, Muhammad helped found a learn-to-swim program with the Boys and Girls Clubs of Metro Atlanta that eventually became a pilot for USA Swimming's Make a Splash Program in 2007.

== See also ==
- Diversity in swimming
