= 1992 NCAA Division I Men's Swimming and Diving Championships =

American college aquatic sports competition

1992 NCAA Division I Swimming and Diving Championships
- Host city: Indianapolis, Indiana
- Date(s): March 1992
- Venue(s): Indiana University Natatorium; Indiana University

The 1992 NCAA Division I Men's Swimming and Diving Championships were contested in March 1992 at the Indiana University Natatorium in Indianapolis, Indiana at the 69th annual NCAA-sanctioned swim meet to determine the team and individual national champions of Division I men's collegiate swimming and diving in the United States. The men's and women's titles would not be held at the same site until 2006.

Stanford topped the team standings, finishing 76 points ahead of four-time defending champions Texas. It was the Cardinal's fifth overall title and the fourth for coach Skip Kenney.

== Team standings ==
- Note: Top 10 only
- (H) = Hosts
- ^{(DC)} = Defending champions
- Full results

Rank	Team	Points
1st place, gold medalist(s)	Stanford	506
2nd place, silver medalist(s)	Texas ^{(DC)}	356
3rd place, bronze medalist(s)	UCLA	310
4	California	256
5	Arizona	238
6	Minnesota	217
7	USC	211
8	SMU	198
9	Florida	196
10	Michigan	184

== See also ==
- List of college swimming and diving teams
