= 1977 NCAA Division I Swimming and Diving Championships =

American college aquatic sports competition

- Host city: Cleveland, Ohio
- Date(s): March 1977
- Venue(s): CSU Natatorium; Cleveland State University

The 1977 NCAA Men's Division I Swimming and Diving Championships were contested in March 1977 at the Cleveland State University Natatorium at Cleveland State University in Cleveland, Ohio at the 54th annual NCAA-sanctioned swim meet to determine the team and individual national champions of Division I men's collegiate swimming and diving in the United States.

USC once again topped the team standings, the Trojans' fourth consecutive title and ninth overall.

== Team standings ==
- Note: Top 10 only
- (H) = Hosts
- (DC) = Defending champions
- Full results

Rank	Team	Points
1st place, gold medalist(s)	USC (DC)	385
2nd place, silver medalist(s)	Alabama	204
3rd place, bronze medalist(s)	Tennessee	182
4	Indiana	173
5	Auburn	155
6	UCLA	134
7	Stanford	102
8	California	98
9	SMU	74
10	Long Beach State	63

== See also ==
- List of college swimming and diving teams

The 1977 NCAA Division I Championships were notable for setting new NCAA Records in every event. Actually, records were broken in 16 of the 15 swimming events, because the 1,000 yd Freestyle record was broken on the way in the 1,650 yd Freestyle. This rewriting of the entire record book is believed to be a unique situation.
