= Make a Splash =

Make A Splash is a child-focused water safety initiative created by the USA Swimming Foundation. The goal of the foundation is to prevent drownings by teaching every child in the United States how to swim. Make A Splash works by providing free swimming lessons to underprivileged children at their partner institutions.

The program works by partnering with swim schools, YMCAs, and youth clubs across the country. Currently, Make A Splash has partner institutions in California, Washington, Idaho, Utah, Colorado, Texas, Louisiana, Tennessee, Missouri, Florida, Georgia, South Carolina, North Carolina, Indiana, Illinois, Wisconsin, Michigan, Ohio, Pennsylvania, New York, Virginia, Maryland, and New Jersey.

In October 2016, Make A Splash partnered with SafeSplash Swim Schools, Swimtastic Swim Schools, and Missy Franklin to create the Ripples to Waves program as an extension to the Make A Splash program.

== Celebrities Who Help Out ==
Cullen Jones

Missy Franklin
