= 1987 NCAA Division I men's swimming and diving championships =

American college aquatic sports competition

1987 NCAA Division I Swimming and Diving Championships
- Host city: Austin, Texas
- Date(s): March 1987
- Venue(s): Texas Swimming Center; University of Texas

The 1987 NCAA Division I Men's Swimming and Diving Championships were contested in March 1987 at the Texas Swimming Center at the University of Texas in Austin, Texas at the 64th annual NCAA-sanctioned swim meet to determine the team and individual national champions of Division I men's collegiate swimming and diving in the United States. The men's and women's titles would not be held at the same site until 2006.

Stanford once again topped the team standings, the Cardinal's third consecutive and fourth overall men's title.

== Team standings ==
- Note: Top 10 only
- (H) = Hosts
- ^{(DC)} = Defending champions
- Full results

Rank	Team	Points
1st place, gold medalist(s)	Stanford ^{(DC)}	374
2nd place, silver medalist(s)	USC	296
3rd place, bronze medalist(s)	Florida	293
4	California	269
5	Texas (H)	257
6	Michigan	174
7	UCLA	146
8	LSU	145
9	Arizona	142
10	Arizona State; South Carolina	115

== See also ==
- List of college swimming and diving teams
