= Brian Job =

American swimmer (1951–2019)

- Job while at Stanford in 1971

Personal information
- Full name: Brian Gregory Job
- National team: United States
- Born: November 29, 1951 Warren, Ohio, U.S.
- Died: August 14, 2019 (aged 67) Palo Alto, California, U.S.
- Height: 5 ft 11 in (1.80 m)
- Weight: 163 lb (74 kg)

Sport
- Sport: Swimming
- Strokes: Breaststroke
- Club: Santa Clara Swim Club
- College team: Stanford University
- Coach: George Haines (Santa Clara SC); James Gaughran (Stanford)
Medal record
Men's swimming
Representing the United States
Olympic Games
Bronze medal – third place	1968 Mexico City	200 m breaststroke
Pan American Games
Gold medal – first place	1971 Cali	4x100 m medley
Silver medal – second place	1971 Cali	100 m breaststroke
Bronze medal – third place	1971 Cali	200 m breaststroke

Brian Gregory Job (November 29, 1951 – August 14, 2019) was an American competition swimmer, who competed for Stanford University, a 1968 bronze Olympic medalist in the breaststroke, and a world record-holder. Though a high performer on achievement tests, he was hyperactive as a child both at home and school, and could display a temper. He graduated from Harvard Business School in 1977, and founded two silicon valley computer software companies in the 1980's.

Born on November 29, 1951 in Warren, Ohio as one of four siblings, around 1966, at age 16, he would move with his family to Southern California in search of better swim coaching and training. In his early career, he was coached by his mother. After his move to California, he would attend and compete for Santa Clara High School, and train primarily for coach George Haines' Santa Clara Swim Club, a national swimming power that included Olympic gold medalists Mark Spitz, and Don Schollander. Under Haines's mentoring and training, Job won fourteen America Athletic Union (AAU) national titles.

Job in January, 1968, at the Ralph Wright Memorial Swim Meet

At the Ralph Wright Memorial Swim Meet on January 22, 1968, Job broke his own AAU record for Boys 15-17 in the 100-yard breaststroke with a time of 1:00.3.

== Stanford University ==
He attended Stanford University, graduating with an engineering degree in 1973. From 1969-1973 he swam for the Stanford Cardinal swimming and diving team in National Collegiate Athletic Association (NCAA) competition under Hall of Fame Coach James Gaughran who managed the Stanford men's swimming team from 1960-1979. In his Stanford Freshman year in 1970, he broke five national records at the NCAA swimming championships. On August 22, 1970, he set a new world record of 2:23.5 in the 200-meter breaststroke, which would stand for almost two years. An accomplished student, in his Senior year, he held a grade point average of 3.4.

At the 1971 Pan American Games, Job swam as a member of the U.S. relay team that won the gold medal in the 4×100-meter medley relay with Americans John Murphy, Jerry Heidenreich, and the non-Olympian Frank Heckl, who had not been an Olympic participant but had trained with Job at the Santa Clara Swim Club. In individual events at the Pan Am Games, Job won a silver in the 100 meter breaststroke, and bronze in the 200 meter breaststroke.

== 1968-72 Olympics ==
As a 17-year old, at the October, 1968 Summer Olympics in Mexico City, he captured the bronze medal for a third-place finish in a close race at the men's 200-meter breaststroke, with a time of 2:29.9. Felipe Muñoz of the host Mexican team, turned in the fastest qualifying time in the preliminary heats with a 2:31.1, But Job's 2:31.5 was a close second. Both times were well behind Vladimir Kosinsky's world record of time of 2:27.4. The high altitude in Mexico caused all the competitors to have issues in races of 200 meters and longer. Russian team Vladimar Kosinsky, the favorite to win, was leading the final heat at the first turn, followed closed by Germany's Egon Henninger and Job. Kosinsky retained the lead for 150 metres, but Egon Henninger and Russian Nikolay Pankin moved closer, while Brian Job remained in second. Hometown favorite Felipe Muñoz was in fifth but gaining ground, when the Mexican crowd cheered loudly as he made up ground on Russian favorite Vladimir Kosinsky, passing Pankin off the final turn. In an exciting finish which pleased the home Mexican crowd, Muñoz passed Pankin after the final turn and caught Russian favorite Kosinsky at 175 meters, pulling away in the final metres to win, with a time of 2:28.7 to Kosinsky's 2:29.2. The gold medal was Mexico’s first of the 1968 Olympics, and their first gold medal ever in a swimming event. Job retained his position for the bronze medal.

Job qualified for the 1972 Summer Olympics in Munich, but did not advance beyond the preliminary heats of the 200-meter breaststroke.

Job set a World and several American records in his career as an elite breaststroker. As previously noted, he completed his best known swim, an individual world record, of 2:23.5 in the 200 breaststroke on 22 August 1980 in Los Angeles. He recorded four individual long-course American individual records, with two in the 100 breast and two in the 200 breast.

== Later life ==
An accomplished engineer, after earning an MBA from Harvard in 1977, Job founded two start-up companies in silicon valley. From 1981-1984, he launched and became Chief Executive Officer of Via Video, a successful computer software company. From 1984-87 he started, served as board chair and was Chief Executive Officer of Networked Picture Systems, which was not a long range success. By 1985, according to his sister, he was showing signs of bipolar disorder, according to his sister, sleeping for long periods, and then staying awake for days afterwards. He worked as a computer industry consultant in engineering and the computer industry through the mid-1990s.

Stress from the management of his second business led to an emotional decline, and he lost his home, ending up on the streets in greater Palo Alto by 2005, frequently on Camino Real. His family believed he was suffering from both bi-polar disorder and various addictions, including alcohol. On August 14, 2019, Job was found dead in his motel room at the Glass Slipper Inn in Palo Alto.

== Honors ==
In 1972-3, as a Senior at Stanford, Job won the Al Masters Trophy as the best scholar athlete of the year. In January, 1978 Job was officially inducted into the Stanford University Hall of Fame in Swimming and Diving along with four other Stanford alumni.

== See also ==
- List of Olympic medalists in swimming (men)
- List of Stanford University people
- World record progression 200 metres breaststroke
