= Evan Stewart (diver) =

Zimbabwean diver (born 1975)

Personal information
- Born: June 11, 1975 (age 51) Salisbury, Rhodesia
Medal record
Men's diving
Representing Zimbabwe
World Championships
Gold medal – first place	1994 Rome	1m Springboard
Commonwealth Games
Gold medal – first place	1998 Kuala Lumpur	1m Springboard
Silver medal – second place	1994 Victoria	3m Springboard
Bronze medal – third place	1994 Victoria	1m Springboard

Evan Stewart (born June 11, 1975) is a former Olympic diver for Zimbabwe. He competed in three consecutive Summer Olympics for his native country, starting in 1992 (Barcelona, Spain). Stewart was an All-American for the University of Tennessee swimming and diving team from 1994 to 1997.

Stewart captured two medals at the 1994 Commonwealth Games in Victoria, British Columbia, Canada. He is the son of former field hockey player Anthea Stewart, who won the gold medal in the women's competition at the 1980 Summer Olympics in Moscow, Soviet Union.

== See also ==
- List of divers
