= Jeremy Linn =

American swimmer (born 1975)

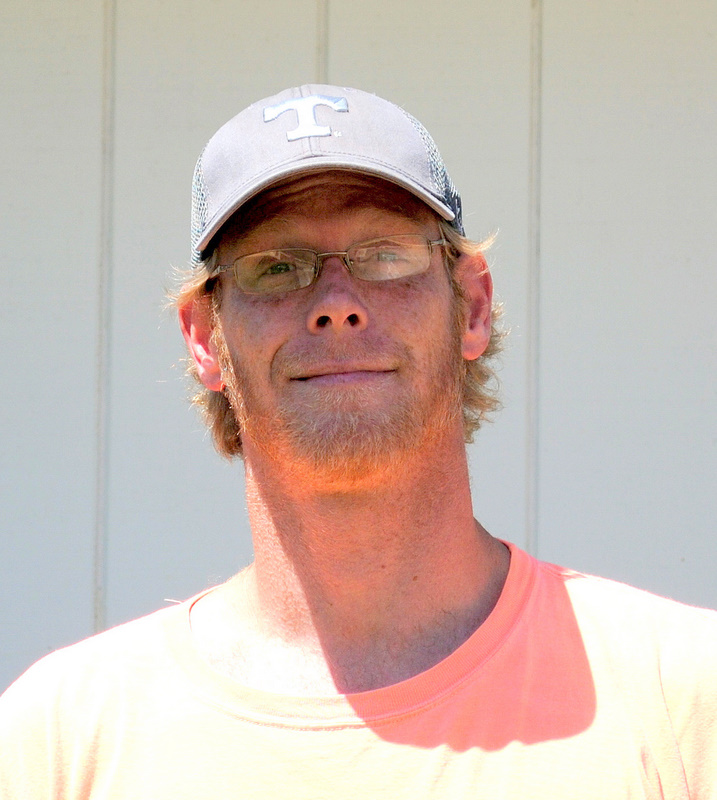
- Jeremy Linn, 2011

Personal information
- Full name: Jeremy Porter Linn
- National team: United States
- Born: January 6, 1975 (age 51) Harrisburg, Pennsylvania, U.S.
- Height: 6 ft 5 in (1.96 m)
- Weight: 183 lb (83 kg)

Sport
- Sport: Swimming
- Strokes: Breaststroke, freestyle
- Club: Devon Crest Swim Club
- College team: University of Tennessee; 1994-1998; Did not swim in 98
- Coach: John Trembley (UT)
Medal record
Men's swimming
Representing the United States
Olympics
Gold medal – first place	Atlanta 1996	4x100 m medley
Silver medal – second place	Atlanta 1996	100 m breaststroke

Jeremy Linn
Coaching career (HC unless noted)
- 2004–2007: QDD Swim Team; Quantico Dolphins; Manassas, Virg.
- Aug-Dec '07: Tar Heal Aquatics; Chapel Hill, N.C.
- 2008-present: Nation's Capital Swim Club

Accomplishments and honors

Awards
- U. of Tennessee Athletics Hall of Fame; Tennessee Sports Hall of Fame '95 SEC Swimmer of the Year

Jeremy Porter Linn (born January 6, 1975) is an American former competition swimmer, Olympic medalist, world record-holder and current swim coach. Linn set an American record in the 100-meter breaststroke while winning the silver medal in that event at the 1996 Summer Olympics in Atlanta, in a time of 1:00.77. With a burst of speed in the final stretch, he finished just .12 seconds behind the gold medal winner from Belgium who had previously set the World Record.

== Early life and swimming ==
Linn was born in Harrisburg, Pennsylvania on January 6, 1975, and swam his first race at the age of four. In High School, he swam for the Central Dauphin High School Rams, where he became a State Championship winner. A nationally ranked High School swimmer, in the summer he swam for the Devon Crest Swim Club. In 1993, at 18, he set a pool and meet record of 26.22 in the 50 breaststroke in the Mid-Cap Championship Meet for the top six swimmers in each event. At 18, in March, 1993, he set a Meet Record in the Pennsylvania Interscholastic Athletic Association District III Swimming championships in the 100-yard breaststroke of 56.50 seconds, but would improve it to 55.86. The 100-yard breaststroke would remain his signature event.

== Olympic swimming ==
At the 1996 Olympics in Atlanta, Georgia, Mark Henderson, Gary Hall Jr., Jeff Rouse and Linn set a new world record in the men's 400-metre medley relay, taking a gold medal, and of course, as mentioned earlier, Linn took the silver in the 100-meter breast. Linn was known for his unusual warm-up routine and unorthodox swim sets, and was given the nickname "The Goat" due to his facial hair.

In 1998, Linn took a silver medal at the World Championships in the medley relay.

== Collegiate swimming ==
Linn attended the University of Tennessee from 1995 to 1998, under Head Coach John Trembley, where he was a member of the Tennessee Volunteers swimming and diving team in the National Collegiate Athletic Association (NCAA) and Southeastern Conference (SEC) competition. A psychology major, he was a seventeen-time All-American. He was only the third athlete to win the same event, the 100-yard breaststroke for four consecutive years at the SEC Championships. Linn won eleven SEC swimming titles-six individual and five relay. He was highly instrumental in leading the Tennessee Volunteers to an SEC team championship in Austin in February 1996 where events he won included the 200-yard medley relay in American Record time, the 400-yard medley relay in SEC record time, and the 100-yard breaststroke in pool record time.

=== NCAA performances and titles ===
==== 1995 ====
At the national level, Linn won four individual NCAA titles. At the March, 1995 Division I NCAA Championships in Indianapolis, he placed second in the 100 breaststroke, not suitable for a title, though he was only .04 seconds behind the first place finisher.

==== 1996 ====
At the 1996 NCAA Championships in March at the University of Texas, as a Sophomore, he helped win the 200 meter Medley Relay in American Record time, and won the 100-yard breaststroke in the third fastest time in American history, 53.02 seconds.

=== 1997 ===
At the March, 1997 NCAA Championships in Minneapolis, he won the 200 breaststroke in a pool record time of 1:55.27, and the 100-yard breaststroke in 52.32 seconds. Linn held the NCAA and U.S. Open record in the 100 yard breaststroke until 2007, until it was broken by Mike Alexandrov of Northwestern University.

== Coaching ==
Linn was the senior coach at the Quantico Devil Dolphins (QDD) Swim Team in Manassas, Virginia from September 2004 until August 2007. The team is now known as the Potomac Dolphins after a merger with the larger Potomac Dolphins Club. While there, he coached three swimmers to national championship qualifying times. He coached three of the four QDD women in the 200-meter freestyle relay to the VSI State Senior Championships for short course in 2007, breaking the meet record and nearly breaking the five-year-old state record. Linn coached 11 QDD athletes whom achieved USA Swimming's Scholastic All-American status for the 2006–07 school year.

Linn coached for Tar Heel Aquatic Team, in Durham-Chapel Hill, North Carolina from August 2007 to December 2007.

=== Nation's Capital Swim Club ===
He coached for Nations Capital swim team in northern Virginia from 2008–2023, as of 2023. Since taking his position with the Nation's Capital Swim Club in 2008, he has led the "West Division" to far greater competitive success. He has coached a number of USAS Scholastic All Americans, 20 Olympic trial qualifiers, four members to the U.S. National Junior Team, and helped one club swimmer qualify for the 2023 Pan Am Games' National Team. Linn was a staff member when the U.S. National Junior Team attended the World Cup Meets in Berlin and Budapest. While at Nation's Capital, he was on the board of USA Swimming's Coach’s Athlete Council (CAC) as a representative of the National Team.

== Honors ==
In 2023, he was selected to be inducted in the University of Tennessee Athletics Hall of Fame. In 1999, three years after winning his Olympic medals, he was selected to be in the Tennessee Sports Hall of Fame. He was earlier named the 1995 Southeastern Conference Swimmer of the Year.

== See also ==
- List of Olympic medalists in swimming (men)
- List of University of Tennessee people
- World record progression 4 × 100 metres medley relay
- Swimming at the 1996 Summer Olympics – Men's 100 metre breaststroke Linn's Olympic Silver Medal Event
