= David Edgar (swimmer) =

American swimmer (born 1950)

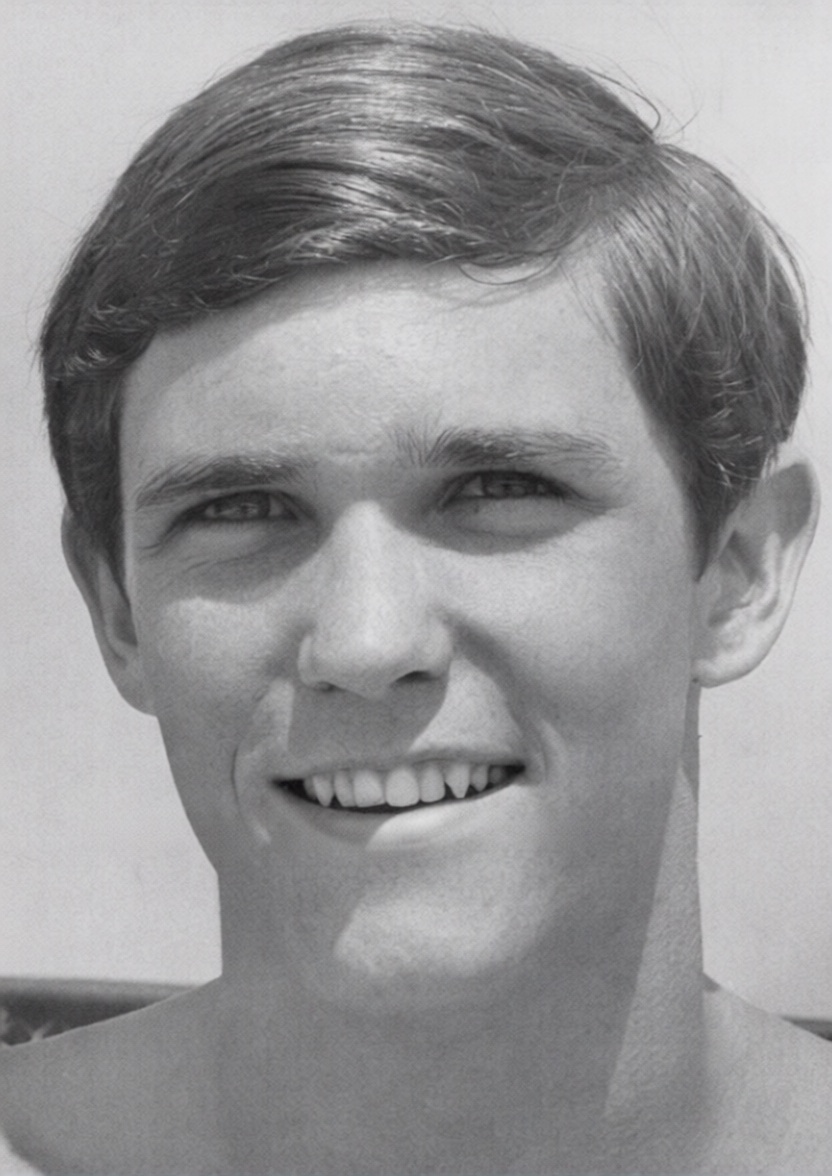
- Edgar in 1970

Personal information
- Full name: David Holmes Edgar
- Nickname: "Dave"
- National team: United States
- Born: March 27, 1950 (age 76) Fort Lauderdale, Florida, U.S.
- Height: 6 ft 2 in (1.88 m)
- Weight: 190 lb (86 kg)

Sport
- Sport: Swimming
- Strokes: Butterfly, freestyle
- Club: Jack Nelson Swim Club
- College team: University of Tennessee
- Coach: Jack Nelson; Jack Nelson Swim Club; Ray Bussard; U. Tennessee
Medal record
Men's swimming
Representing United States
Olympic Games
Gold medal – first place	1972 Munich	4x100 m freestyle
Pan American Games
Gold medal – first place	1971 Cali	4x100 m freestyle

David Holmes "Dave" Edgar (born March 27, 1950) is an American former swimmer, 1972 Olympic champion, and former world record-holder. In a period of seven years, he lost only one 50-yard race, due to a faulty starting block. Excelling in the efficiency of his flip turn technique under the mentorship of Coach Ray Bussard at the University of Tennessee, many consider Edgar one of the greatest short course 50 and 100-yard sprinters of the 1970s.

== Early swimming ==
Edgar began his swimming career in earnest under Hall of Fame Coach Jack Nelson at the Ft. Lauderdale Swim Club, and while swimming at Ft. Lauderdale High School under Coach John Wienants set a national high school record of 21.2 seconds for the 50-yard freestyle. As Captain of the Fort Lauderdale High School Swim Team, he was undefeated in the 50-yard freestyle his Senior year and was recruited by Tennessee to receive a swimming scholarship. He was a High School All-American in the 1967 season, and held the Junior Olympic 50-meter long course record of 24.6. Edgar officially set records of a 21.5 in the 50 freestyle, which he would improve upon, and a 49.1 in the 100 freestyle at the Southeastern Swimming Championships at the Emory Pool in Atlanta on February 3, 1968.

== U. of Tennessee ==
Edgar attended the University of Tennessee under Hall of Fame Coach Ray Bussard beginning in the Fall of 1968, where he swam for the Tennessee Volunteers swimming and diving team in National Collegiate Athletic Association (NCAA) and Southeastern Conference competition. Teamed with another exceptional freestyler and future Tennessee Coach John Trembley, Tennessee was highly competitive during Edgar's swimming years.

Edgar won seven NCAA championships while swimming for the Volunteers, and was named the "Fastest Man Afloat" by Sports Illustrated magazine. His mastery of the Tennessee Turn, a flip turn carefully styled by Tennessee Coach Bussard helped reduce Edgar's sprint times and led to his becoming the first competitive swimmer to record times under 45 seconds for the 100-yard freestyle. He won one of his other signature events, the 100-yard indoor freestyle at the 1970 National AAU meet, and captured a first in the same event at the NCAA for his University of Tennessee Volunteers in 1970, 1971, and 1972, often defeating Mark Spitz.

== International competition highlights ==
=== 1972 Olympics ===
At the 1972 Olympic Trials, he finished fourth in the 100 meter freestyle, missing selection, but placed second in the 100 butterfly, though he was not expected to qualify in the event, and was selected for the 4x100 meter freestyle relay.

Travelling with the team, he represented the United States at the 1972 Summer Olympics in Munich, Germany, receiving a gold medal in the 4×100-meter freestyle relay, setting a time of 3:26.42, while swimming with the team of John Murphy, Jerry Heidenreich, Mark Spitz, Dave Fairbank, and Gary Conelly.

He received another gold medal in 4×100-meter freestyle relay at the 1971 Pan American Games in Cali, Colombia with the team of Steve Genter, Jerry Heidenreich, and the non-Olympian Frank Heckl. He set two world records during his career, both in the 4×100-meter freestyle relay.

Besides his Olympic gold, he was on a winning 4×100 metre freestyle relay team (with Steve Genter, Jerry Heidenreich, and the non-Olympian Frank Heckl) at the 1971 Pan American Games.

In 1998, he was the married father of three children, and working as a businessman and life insurance agent in Fort Lauderdale.

Edgar was inducted into the International Swimming Hall of Fame as an "Honor Swimmer" in 1996.

== See also ==
- List of members of the International Swimming Hall of Fame
- List of Olympic medalists in swimming (men)
- List of University of Tennessee people
- World record progression 4 × 100 metres freestyle relay
