= Swimming at the 1956 Summer Olympics – Men's 100 metre freestyle =

Men's 100 metre freestyle at the Games of the XVI Olympiad
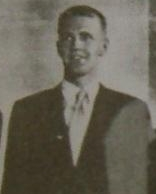
- Jon Henricks
- Venue: Melbourne Sports and Entertainment Centre
- Dates: 29 November 1956 (heats & semifinals); 30 November 1956 (final)
- Competitors: 34 from 19 nations
- Winning time: 55.4 WR

Medalists
1st place, gold medalist(s)		Jon Henricks; Australia
2nd place, silver medalist(s)		John Devitt; Australia
3rd place, bronze medalist(s)		Gary Chapman; Australia

The men's 100 metre freestyle event at the 1956 Olympic Games took place between 29 and 30 November. There were 34 competitors from 19 nations. Nations had been limited to three swimmers each since the 1924 Games. The event was won by Jon Henricks of Australia, the nation's first medal in the event. Australia would win a second 0.4 seconds later (John Devitt's silver) and a third 0.9 seconds after that (Gary Chapman's bronze), sweeping the podium—the first sweep in the men's 100 metre freestyle since the United States did it in 1920 and 1924, and the first sweep of any event by Australian competitors. This year, the Americans finished fourth through sixth. It was the first time since 1924 that Japan had competed (that is, excluding 1948) but not medaled.

== Background ==
This was the 12th appearance of the men's 100 metre freestyle. The event has been held at every Summer Olympics except 1900 (when the shortest freestyle was the 200 metres), though the 1904 version was measured in yards rather than metres.

Two of the eight finalists from the 1952 Games returned: silver medalist Hiroshi Suzuki of Japan and seventh-place finisher Aldo Eminente of France. The favorite in 1956 was Jon Henricks of Australia, a converted distance swimmer who had begun racing sprints in 1953.

Colombia and Indonesia each made their debut in the event; East and West Germany competed together as the United Team of Germany for the first time. The United States made its 12th appearance, having competed at each edition of the event to date.

== Competition format ==
The competition used a three-round (heats, semifinals, final) format. The advancement rule followed the format introduced in 1952 (though with only 2 semifinals instead of 3). A swimmer's place in the heat was not used to determine advancement; instead, the fastest times from across all heats in a round were used. There were 5 heats of 6 or 7 swimmers each. The top 16 swimmers advanced to the semifinals. There were 2 semifinals of 8 swimmers each. The top 8 swimmers advanced to the final. Swim-offs were used as necessary to break ties.

This swimming event used freestyle swimming, which means that the method of the stroke is not regulated (unlike backstroke, breaststroke, and butterfly events). Nearly all swimmers use the front crawl or a variant of that stroke. Because an Olympic size swimming pool is 50 metres long, this race consisted of two lengths of the pool.

== Records ==
These were the standing world and Olympic records (in seconds) prior to the 1956 Summer Olympics.

World record	Dick Cleveland (USA)	54.8	New Haven, United States	1 April 1954
Olympic record	Clarke Scholes (USA)	57.1	Helsinki, Finland	27 July 1952

Reid Patterson broke the Olympic record in the fourth heat with a time of 56.8 seconds; in the same heat, Atsushi Tani tied the old record. In the first semifinal, Jon Henricks broke Patterson's new record with a 55.7 second time. Dick Hanley came in under the old record time; in the second semifinal, Patterson matched the pre-1956 record, Gary Chapman, beat the pre-1956 record, and John Devitt beat Patterson's mark from the heats. Henrick's final time of 55.4 was another new Olympic record as well as the world competitive (non-time trial) record.

== Schedule ==
Date	Time	Round
Thursday, 29 November 1956	14:00; 20:35	Heats; Semifinals
Friday, 30 November 1956	19:55	Final

== Results ==
=== Heats ===
Five heats were held; the fastest sixteen swimmers advanced to the semifinal round.

Rank	Heat	Swimmer	Nation	Time	Notes
1	4	Reid Patterson	United States	56.8	Q, OR
2	4	Atsushi Tani	Japan	57.1	Q
3	3	John Devitt	Australia	57.2	Q
4	1	Jon Henricks	Australia	57.3	Q
5	2	Manabu Koga	Japan	57.7	Q
6	5	Gary Chapman	Australia	57.8	Q
6	1	Dick Hanley	United States	57.8	Q
8	2	Aldo Eminente	France	58.0	Q
9	5	Bill Woolsey	United States	58.2	Q
10	3	Paolo Pucci	Italy	58.3	Q
10	5	Ronald Roberts	Great Britain	58.3	Q
12	3	Hiroshi Suzuki	Japan	58.4	Q
12	3	Paul Voell	United Team of Germany	58.4	Q
14	5	Gyula Dobay	Hungary	58.5	Q
14	4	Carlo Pedersoli	Italy	58.5	Q
16	2	Vitaly Sorokin	Soviet Union	58.6	Q
17	5	George Park	Canada	58.8	
18	1	Billy Steuart	South Africa	59.2	
19	3	Kenneth Williams	Great Britain	59.4	
20	3	Dennis Ford	South Africa	59.5	
21	1	Lev Balandin	Soviet Union	59.6	
22	2	Cheung Kin Man	Hong Kong	59.8	
22	1	Karri Käyhkö	Finland	59.8	
22	1	Hans Köhler	United Team of Germany	59.8	
25	4	Haroldo Lara	Brazil	59.9	
26	2	Horst Bleeker	United Team of Germany	1:00.1	
26	4	Habib Nasution	Indonesia	1:00.1	
28	5	Dakula Arabani	Philippines	1:00.2	
28	4	Alex Jany	France	1:00.2	
28	2	Sergio Martínez	Colombia	1:00.2	
31	2	Peter Duncan	South Africa	1:00.4	
32	1	André Laurent	Belgium	1:00.7	
32	5	Wan Shiu Ming	Hong Kong	1:00.7	
34	3	Sri Chand Bajaj	India	1:01.6	

=== Semifinals ===
Two heats were held; the swimmers with the fastest eight times advanced to the final.

Rank	Heat	Swimmer	Nation	Time	Notes
1	1	Jon Henricks	Australia	55.7	Q, OR
2	2	John Devitt	Australia	56.4	Q
3	2	Gary Chapman	Australia	56.9	Q
3	1	Dick Hanley	United States	56.9	Q
5	2	Reid Patterson	United States	57.1	Q
6	1	Atsushi Tani	Japan	57.4	Q
7	1	Aldo Eminente	France	58.0	Q
7	2	Bill Woolsey	United States	58.0	Q
9	1	Hiroshi Suzuki	Japan	58.0	
10	2	Gyula Dobay	Hungary	58.1	
10	2	Manabu Koga	Japan	58.1	
12	1	Vitaly Sorokin	Soviet Union	58.2	
13	2	Paul Voell	United Team of Germany	58.6	
14	1	Paolo Pucci	Italy	58.8	
15	2	Ronald Roberts	Great Britain	58.9	
16	1	Carlo Pedersoli	Italy	59.0	

=== Final ===
Rank	Swimmer	Nation	Time	Notes
1st place, gold medalist(s)	Jon Henricks	Australia	55.4	WR
2nd place, silver medalist(s)	John Devitt	Australia	55.8	
3rd place, bronze medalist(s)	Gary Chapman	Australia	56.7	
4	Reid Patterson	United States	57.2	
5	Dick Hanley	United States	57.6	
6	Bill Woolsey	United States	57.6	
7	Atsushi Tani	Japan	58.0	
8	Aldo Eminente	France	58.1	
