= Swimming at the 1956 Summer Olympics – Men's 4 × 200 metre freestyle relay =

Men's 4 × 200 metre freestyle relay at the Games of the XVI Olympiad
- Venue: Melbourne Sports and Entertainment Centre
- Date: 1 December 1956 (heats); 3 December 1956 (final)
- Competitors: 50 from 11 nations
- Teams: 11
- Winning time: 8:23.6 WR

Medalists
1st place, gold medalist(s)		Kevin O'Halloran, John Devitt, Murray Rose, Jon Henricks	Australia
2nd place, silver medalist(s)		Dick Hanley, George Breen, Bill Woolsey, Ford Konno	United States
3rd place, bronze medalist(s)		Vitaly Sorokin, Vladimir Struzhanov, Gennady Nikolayev, Boris Nik'it'ini	Soviet Union

The men's 4 × 200 metre freestyle relay event at the 1956 Summer Olympic Games took place 1 – 3 December The relay featured teams of four swimmers each swimming four lengths of the 50 m pool freestyle.

== Results ==
=== Heats ===
Two heats were held; the teams with the eight fastest times advanced to the Finals. The teams that advanced are highlighted.

==== Heat 1 ====
Place	Swimmers	Time	Notes
1	Hiroshi Suzuki, Atsushi Tani, Koji Nonoshita, Tsuyoshi Yamanaka (JPN)	8:37.9	
2	Dick Hanley, Tim Jecko, Sonny Tanabe, Ford Konno (USA)	8:38.3	
3	Hans Köhler, Hans-Joachim Reich, Hans Zierold, Horst Bleeker (GER)	8:42.5	
4	Billy Steuart, Tony Briscoe, Dennis Ford, Peter Duncan (RSA)	8:43.0	
5	Fritz Dennerlein, Paolo Galletti, Guido Elmi, Angelo Romani (ITA)	8:43.1	

==== Heat 2 ====
Place	Swimmers	Time	Notes
1	Kenneth Williams, Ronald Roberts, Neil McKechnie, Jack Wardrop (GBR)	8:39.1	
2	Vladimir Struzhanov, Gennady Nikolayev, Vitaly Sorokin, Boris Nik'it'ini (URS)	8:39.5	
3	John Devitt, Gary Chapman, Graham Hamilton, Murray Garretty (AUS)	8:40.2	
4	Aldo Eminente, Jacques Collignon, Alex Jany, Jean Boiteux (FRA)	8:56.5	
5	Gyula Dobay, György Csordás, Sándor Záborszky, Jenő Áts (HUN)	8:57.2	
6	Dakula Arabani, Agapito Lozada, Bana Sailani, Ulfiano Babol (PHI)	9:05.7	

=== Final ===
Place	Swimmers	Time	Notes
1st place, gold medalist(s)	Kevin O'Halloran, John Devitt, Murray Rose, Jon Henricks (AUS)	8:23.6	WR
2nd place, silver medalist(s)	Dick Hanley, George Breen, Bill Woolsey, Ford Konno (USA)	8:31.5	
3rd place, bronze medalist(s)	Vitaly Sorokin, Vladimir Struzhanov, Gennady Nikolayev, Boris Nik'it'ini (URS)	8:34.7	
4	Manabu Koga, Atsushi Tani, Koji Nonoshita, Tsuyoshi Yamanaka (JPN)	8:36.6	
5	Hans Köhler, Hans-Joachim Reich, Hans Zierold, Horst Bleeker (GER)	8:43.4	
6	Kenneth Williams, Ronald Roberts, Neil McKechnie, Jack Wardrop (GBR)	8:45.2	
7	Fritz Dennerlein, Paolo Galletti, Guido Elmi, Angelo Romani (ITA)	8:46.2	
8	Billy Steuart, Tony Briscoe, Dennis Ford, Peter Duncan (RSA)	8:49.5	
