= Hoʻolulu Park =

Park and Recreation Center

Hoʻolulu Park Complex
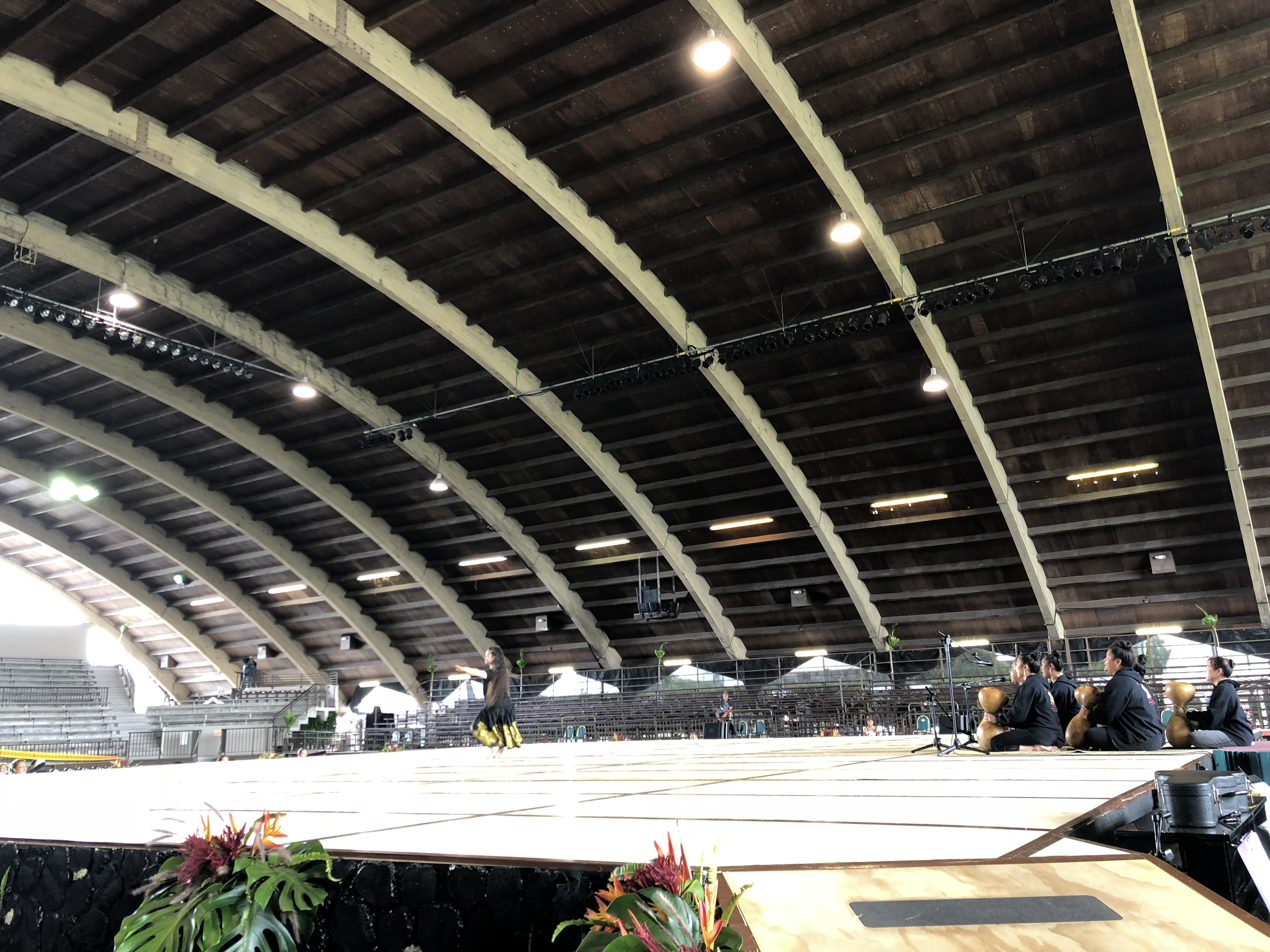
- Photograph inside the Edith Kanakaʻole Multi-Purpose Stadium in 2019; it is set up with a stage for the Merrie Monarch Festival hula competition
- Interactive map of Hoʻolulu Park Complex
- Nearest city: Hilo, Hawaii
- Coordinates: 19.719°N 155.068°W
- Area: 56 acres (23 ha)
- Operator: County of Hawaiʻi
- Website: parks.hawaiicounty.gov/facilities-parks/ho-olulu-complex

Hoʻolulu Park (officially the Hoʻolulu Park Complex; sometimes shortened to Hoʻolulu Complex) is a 56-acre (23 ha) park and recreation center operated by the County of Hawaiʻi in Hilo, Hawaii, east of the Wailoa River State Recreation Area and downtown Hilo, and west of Hilo International Airport. The venues are named for prominent figures from the Hilo area, including Hilo High School basketball coach Ung Soy "Beans" Afook, boxer and sports promoter Richard "Pablo" Chinen, coach and complex supervisor Aunty Sally Kaleohano, swim coach Charles "Sparky" Kawamoto, youth sports organizer Walter Victor, and sports booster Dr. Francis F.C. Wong. Hoʻolulu Park also is the site of the Edith Kanakaʻole Multi-Purpose Stadium, which hosts nationally prominent events, including the Hilo Orchid Show and the Merrie Monarch Festival.

== History ==
Parks and attractions near Hilo Bay and downtown Hilo, Hawaii
- Points of interest
- Parks and open spaces
- Transportation
1 Lyman House Memorial Museum
2 Haili Church
3 Kalākaua Park / East Hawaii Cultural Center
4 Pacific Tsunami Museum
5 Moʻoheau County Park (Hele-On Bus Terminal) / S. Hata Building / Mokupāpapa Discovery Center
6 Russell Carroll Soccer Fields
7 Aupuni Center / County of Hawaiʻi offices
8 Hilo Bayfront Beach Park
9 Wailoa River State Recreation Area / Waiākea Pond
10 Coconut Island / Moku Ola
11 Queen Liliʻuokalani Park and Gardens / Banyan Drive
12 Grand Naniloa Hotel / Naniloa Golf Course
13 Reed's Bay Beach Park
14 Hoʻolulu Complex (Merrie Monarch Festival site): Afook-Chinen Civic Auditorium · Aunty Sally Kaleohano's Luʻau Hale · Edith Kanakaʻole Stadium · 'Sparky' Kawamoto Swim Stadium · Walter Victor Baseball Complex · Francis Wong Stadium
15 Hilo Harbor
16 Hilo International Airport

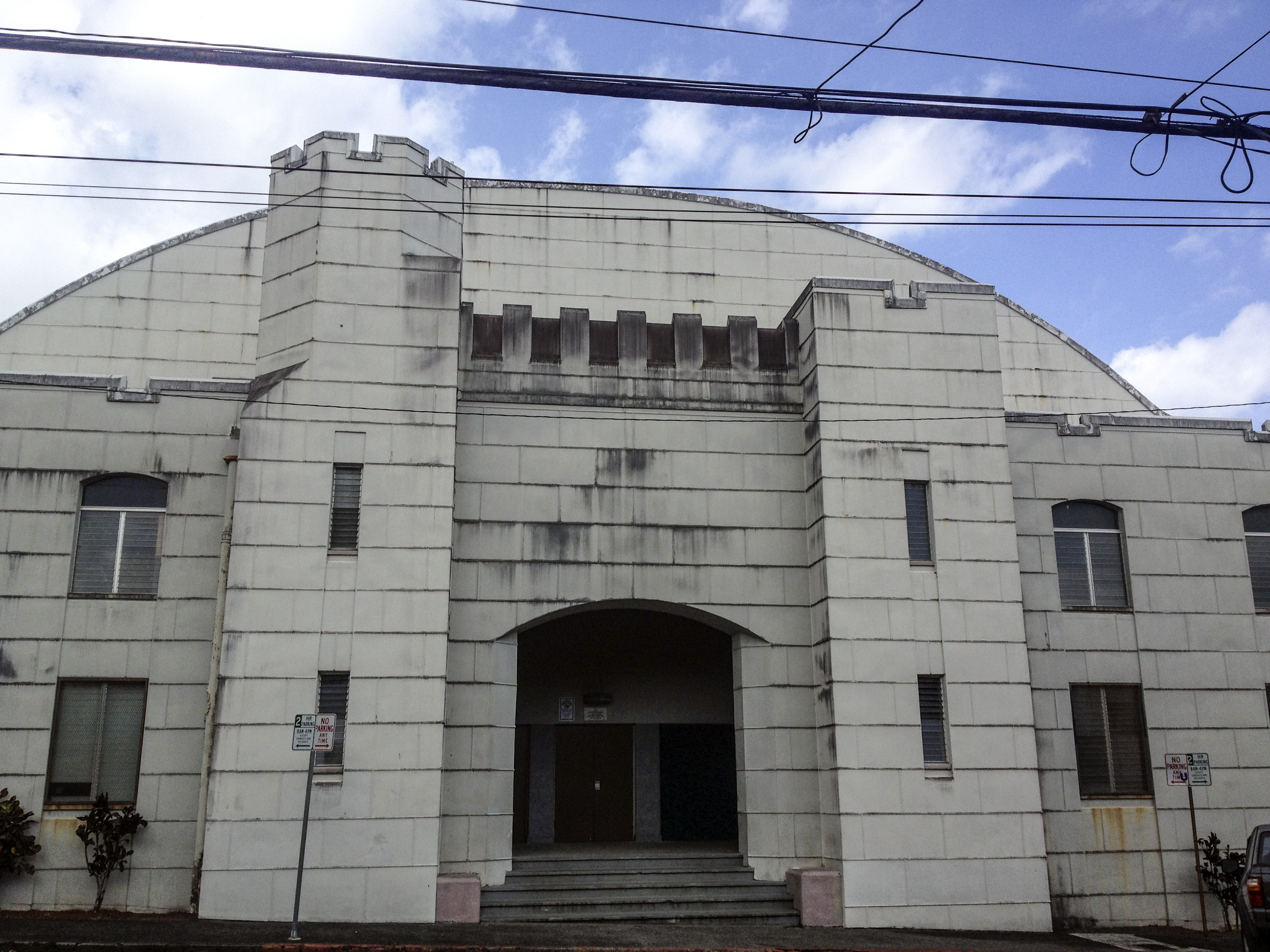
Hilo Armory, 28 Shipman St

Early Hawaiʻi County recreation facilities included the Hilo Armory (completed in 1931) and Cow Palace (officially, the Amfac warehouse), both of which were in downtown Hilo. Although the Armory was completed and dedicated for the Hawaii National Guard on November 25, 1931, it was used as a public space almost immediately, with the Hawaii County Poultry Show opening there on November 27. Later, the Armory was used as the site of senior basketball league games in the 1940s and 50s. Richard Chinen is credited with pushing for a new site for the county recreational facilities after the 1946 tsunami flooded the Hilo Armory.

The Hilo Armory is still standing, and is used currently as the headquarters for the Culture and Education Division of Hawaiʻi County. Pickleball games are held on the badminton court inside the venue.

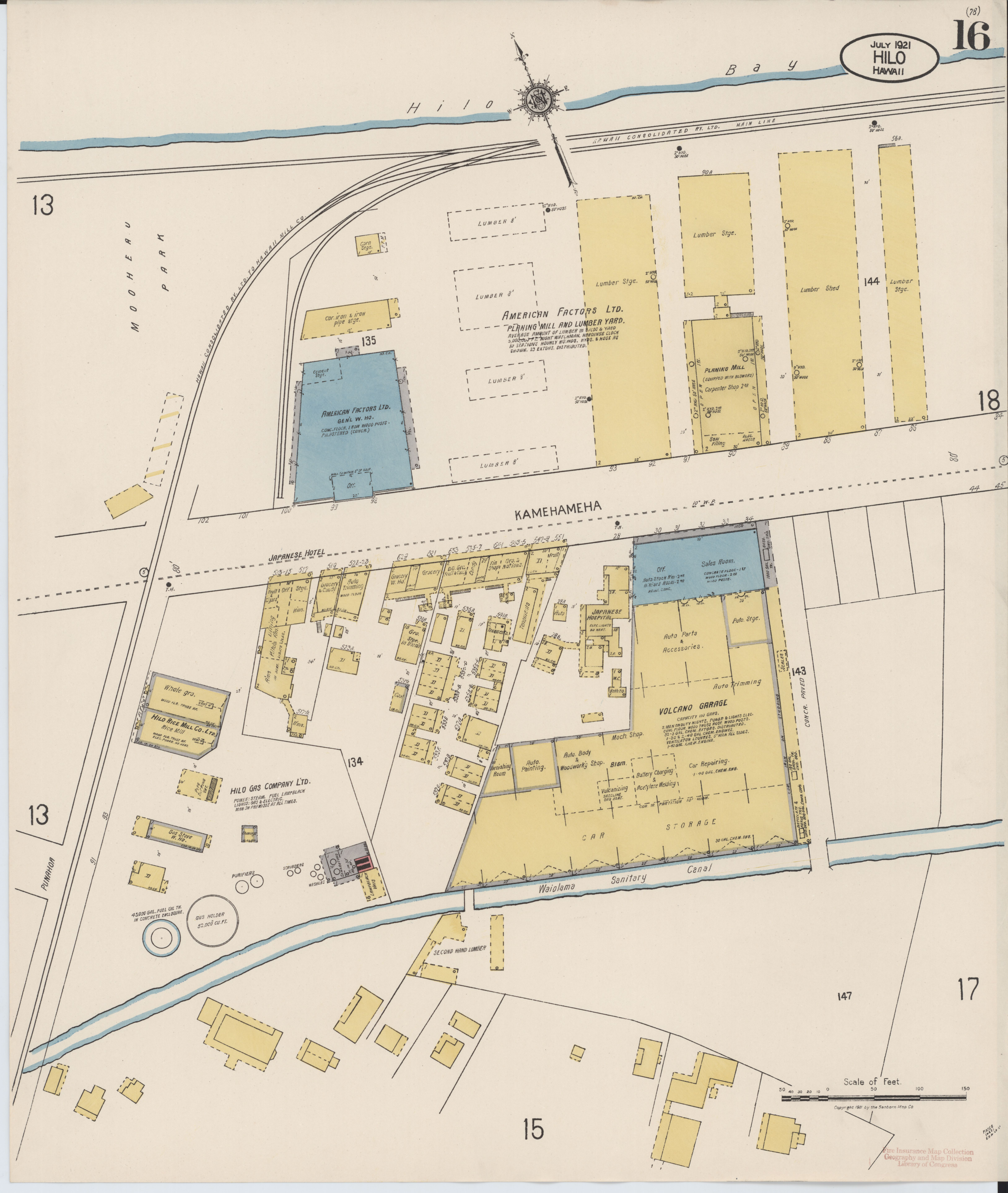
Sanborn map (1921) with AmFac warehouse

The Cow Palace was on the Hilo Bay front near the east end of Moʻoheau Park and was built before World War I for the H. Hackfield Company; it survived the two major tsunamis that destroyed bayfront Hilo after the 1946 Aleutian Islands earthquake and the 1960 Valdivia earthquake. It was nicknamed for its resemblance to the more famous stadium near San Francisco, although it was already known as the Hilo Recreation Building in 1956, when it was used as the venue for the 4th annual orchid show. Part of the roof collapsed in spring 1969 due to termite damage and heavy rains, leading to its demolition; it had served the "Grog Shoppe" for the Merry Monarch Festival, but the bar was moved to one of the butler buildings in 1969.

The Hilo Civic Auditorium was first building completed in 1957 on what would become the Hoʻolulu Park Complex. Additional stadia were added later, mostly in the 1970s. Plans to acquire 124,000 ft^{2} (11,500 m^{2}) of land at the corner of Manono and Piʻilani for parking spaces were evaluated in 1999.

New sports fields were built on a parcel north of Hoʻolulu Complex; the Kuawa Street ball fields were planned in 2015 and dedicated in October 2019.

== Description ==
The Hoʻolulu Park complex is bounded by Kuawa (formerly Kawelolani), Manono, Piʻilani, and Kalanikoa streets. It is the largest park and recreation center complex in Hilo. Hoʻolulu Park is named for Hoʻolulu, a member of the Hawaiian nobility and trusted advisor to King Kamehameha I.

Regular events held at the complex include:

- Hilo Orchid Show (annual)
- Merrie Monarch Festival and Hawaiʻian Arts Fair (annual)
- Hawaiʻi County Fair (annual)

== Venues ==
Facilities within Hoʻolulu Park complex
1 Walter Victor (baseball)
2 'Sparky' Kawamoto (swim)
3 Afook-Chinen (basketball)
4 Francis Wong (baseball/football)
5 Edith Kanakaʻole (tennis/hula)
6 Aunty Sally Kaleohano's Luau Hale

In addition to the six large venues, there are two "butler" buildings north and south of the Civic Auditorium parking lot, named Hāmākua and Puna. These have been used to accommodate overflow from events in neighboring buildings, and to shelter residents displaced by floods.

=== Walter C.K. Victor Stadium (youth baseball) ===
Walter Victor was a County police officer who promoted youth participation in sports, including baseball, and served as coach for many teams. Victor, who was a student at St. Mary's School, and later served as its basketball coach, suffered a heart attack and died in April 1973.

The stadium complex named for him has three youth baseball fields. The grandstand at Victor Stadium has a capacity of 200 spectators.

=== Charles "Sparky" Kawamoto Swim Stadium ===
The swimming pool, completed in 1973 as the Hoʻolulu Swim Stadium, is Olympic-sized and includes a diving tower. A railway roundhouse on privately owned land previously used by the Hawaii Consolidated Railway is just north of the stadium.

Charles "Sparky" Kawamoto founded the Shinmachi Town Swimming Club and Hilo Aquatics Club, where he trained future Olympic swimmers including Yoshi Oyakawa, Ed Kawachika, Denise Baker, Laurence Hao, and Sonny Tanabe. The county renamed the venue to honor Kawamoto on January 30, 1982.

=== Afook-Chinen Civic Auditorium (basketball / events) ===
Completed as the Hilo Civic Auditorium in 1957, this venue was renamed on October 19, 1983 to honor both Ung Soy "Beans" Afook (October 15, 1901 – January 16, 1991), the former basketball coach at Hilo High, and Richard Kiyoshi "Pablo" Chinen (February 13, 1919 – January 17, 1991), an amateur boxer and sports promoter; this avoided a potential conflict between the two families. Afook won the territorial basketball title in 1935, his first year coaching Hilo High, and went on to win 10 titles in 15 years of coaching (1935–49), posting a 193-15 career win–loss record. His Hilo High teams won the territorial titles in 1935, 1936, and over eight consecutive years from 1939–48 (during two of those years, there was no territorial championship tournament due to World War II).

Chinen grew up in an immigrant family from Okinawa working in the sugar cane fields; he dropped out of Hilo High and boxed in Oahu from 1937 to 1941. During World War II, he enlisted in the Varsity Victory Volunteers, which later became the 442nd Regimental Combat Team; for his service, he was awarded the Croix de Guerre, Silver Star, Bronze Star, and Purple Heart. Upon his return to the Big Island, Chinen founded the Big Island Amateur Boxing Club and organized youth baseball leagues. Chinen also promoted the Hawaii Islanders baseball team and the Hilo Civic Auditorium.

Afook-Chinen is the home of the Vulcans basketball team (UH–Hilo). The Big Island Invitational, a small early season college basketball tournament, was held here from 1992 through 2001. The National Basketball Association held two exhibition games at the Hilo Civic Auditorium in 1963, featuring the San Francisco Warriors taking on the Los Angeles Lakers and Philadelphia 76ers as part of the "Hawaii Series". In addition, the Hawaii Volcanos, an expansion franchise of the Continental Basketball Association, played two games at the Civic Auditorium during their inaugural season (1979–80) before moving to Billings, Montana. Afook-Chinen has a capacity of 2,868 using the bleachers only, expanding to 3,568 when main floor seating is used.

Other events, including concerts, are booked at Afook-Chinen; The Five Satins were one of the earliest groups to perform, in November 1957. A recording of the Jerry Garcia Band's concert from May 20, 1990 at the Civic Auditorium is available as Garcia Live Volume 10.

=== Dr. Francis F.C. Wong Stadium (baseball / football) ===
Dr. Francis Wong was the team doctor for multiple sports at Hilo High. Wong served in the Army and Navy in World War II, and aboard an aircraft carrier during the Korean War; in Hilo, he served as the leader for many local sports organizations. He died in 1971, at the age of 52. A memorial plaque detailing his accomplishments was unveiled at the stadium in 1998.

Wong Stadium is the home of the Vulcans baseball team from the University of Hawaii at Hilo. The professional Hilo Stars and Hawaii Stars also played their home games at Wong Stadium. The stadium was also the site of the inaugural Hawaii World Series all-state high school tournament in December 2019. The stadium's grandstand has a capacity of 2,400 spectators.

As of May 2020, the Hilo High School football team holds its home games at Wong, although the school plans to move to an on-campus turf field and synthetic track once completed.

=== Edith Kanakaʻole Multi-Purpose Stadium (tennis / hula) ===
Edith Kanakaʻole was an indigenous Hawaiian dancer, entertainer, and professor who is recognized for her contributions to modern Hawaiian culture and language. Kanakaʻole helped develop the first Hawaiian language program for public school students at the Keaukaha School in Hilo as well as the Hawaiian Studies kupuna (elder) mentor program. She died in October 1979, aged 65.

A 4,200 ft^{2} (390 m^{2}) auxiliary building with restrooms and six dressing rooms was completed in 2013. Kanakaʻole Stadium has a capacity of 3,490 spectators using existing bleachers only, expanding to 5,490 if main floor seating is added.

=== Aunt Sally Kaleohano's Lūʻau Hale ===
Formerly the Seven Seas Lūʻau Hale, this venue is a hale that may be rented for events. During the COVID-19 pandemic in Hawaii, the hale was converted into a command post to coordinate pandemic relief efforts. Sally K.K. Kaleohano died in December 1999, aged 65; she was a supervisor for the Hoʻolulu Complex.

Aunty Sally's has a capacity of 714 standing-only, reduced to 500 if tables and chairs are used.
