= Kevin O'Halloran =

Australian freestyle swimmer (1937–1976)

Personal information
- National team: Australia
- Born: 3 March 1937 Katanning, Western Australia
- Died: 5 July 1976 (aged 39) Kojonup, Western Australia

Sport
- Sport: Swimming
- Strokes: Freestyle
Medal record
Men's swimming
Representing Australia
Men's Olympic Games
Gold medal – first place	1956 Melbourne	4×200 m freestyle

Kevin O'Halloran (3 March 1937 – 5 July 1976) was an Australian freestyle swimmer of the 1950s who won a gold medal in the 4×200-metre freestyle relay at the 1956 Summer Olympics in Melbourne. The first Western Australian to win Olympic gold, O'Halloran learnt to swim in his home town of Katanning. He moved to Perth to attend secondary schooling at Guildford Grammar School, where he became more committed to swimming.

Competitive swimming was not well developed in Western Australia: races were held in muddy river pools; hence, in late 1955, O'Halloran moved to the east coast to support his attempt to qualify for the Olympics. His new coach, Frank Guthrie, overhauled his training regimen and within a year O'Halloran had reduced his times by approximately ten percent. He gained Olympic selection in the relay and the 400-metre freestyle. O'Halloran led off the Australian quartet on the way to a new world record, before placing sixth in the 400-metre. Thereafter, O'Halloran's career was beset by ear problems, and he retired in 1958 after failing to qualify for the 1958 British Empire and Commonwealth Games. In 1976, O'Halloran died after tripping and accidentally shooting himself.

== Early years ==
O'Halloran was born on 3 March 1937, in Katanning, Western Australia. He grew up on his family's 9,000-acre (36 km^{2}) sheep property at Kojonup—40 km (25 mi) to the west of his birthplace—on a property established by his grandfather in 1900. He had two brothers and a sister. After his father enlisted during the Second World War, his mother could no longer run the farm and raise the children by herself, so the family moved to Katanning for seven years.

Katanning was one of the few country towns in Western Australia that had a public swimming pool. Along with his siblings, O'Halloran learned to swim there, often defeating local boys who were four years his senior. At age 8, he was taught to swim competitively by his teacher at Katanning State Primary School, who was an age group champion in her youth. The boom in wool prices at the time of the Korean War inflated his family's income, allowing them to send O'Halloran to Guildford Grammar School in Perth, the state's capital city. At age 14, he won five events in the school championships, and led the school to its first state championship in 29 years. He also competed for his school in Australian rules football and rowing.

O'Halloran attracted the attention of the leading Western Australian coach Don Gravenall, but his schoolwork limited him to a few weeks of intense training over Christmas. In 1952, at age 15, O'Halloran began to make his mark at the state level. He played a major role in Guildford's win at the interschool championships, placing second in the individual points tally. He won the 100 m freestyle, 50 m breaststroke and 400 m freestyle.

Competitive swimming was slow to develop in Western Australia and O'Halloran's state debut came in 1952, only the second time the Western Australian Championships had been held. He won the junior 110 yd freestyle and butterfly and the 220 yd freestyle and was second in the open 110 yd freestyle, in a muddy pool on the Swan River in the Perth suburb of Crawley. The arena was such that the bottom could not be seen and jellyfish lurked in the area, sometimes climbing onto the swimmers' bodies. When O'Halloran returned to his home, he often trained in a muddy waterhole.

== Swimming career ==
In 1953, O'Halloran placed second in the 110 yd and 440 yd freestyle events at the Western Australian Championships in the open division and won the 110 yd breaststroke and the 110 and 220 yd freestyle in the junior division. In the process, he cut six seconds from the state record in the 440 yd event. He was selected for the Western Australian team for the Australian Championships, but his parents and headmaster decided that his schooling was more important, much to Gravenall's chagrin. In 1954, O'Halloran was the state champion in the 110 yd and 220 yd freestyle, and in 1955 he added the 440 yd individual medley title to the successful defence of his freestyle crowns. In his final year at Guildford, O'Halloran was the School Captain, led the swimming and shooting team, and was a member of the rowing eights in the Head of the River. O'Halloran made his national debut at the 1955 Australian Championships in Adelaide; he finished fifth in the 110 yd freestyle behind future Olympians Jon Henricks and John Devitt.

Upon the recommendation of his parents, O'Halloran moved to Sydney in late 1955 to train with Frank Guthrie in an attempt to qualify for the 1956 Summer Olympics in Melbourne, Australia. O'Halloran boarded with a host family and worked in a wool store to pay his expenses. O'Halloran's initiation into Guthrie's training program was difficult. O'Halloran refined his style and increased his workload to around 10 km a day, something that was normal for competitive swimmers in the eastern states, but uncommon in Western Australia. In one month, he cut 17 s off his personal best time in the 440 yd freestyle, reducing it to 4 min 55 s.

At the 1956 New South Wales Championships, O'Halloran finished third in the 220 yd freestyle behind Gary Chapman and Devitt; his time of 2 min 12.6 s was 10 s faster than the times he had recorded in Western Australia. He came fourth in both the 110 yd and 440 yd; his time in the latter event was more than 30 s faster than his best time in Western Australia, and in the former event he breached the 60 s barrier for the first time. At the Australian Championships, he came third in the 440 yd freestyle in a time of 4 min 37.8 s behind Murray Rose and Murray Garretty. He did this despite suffering from ear trouble, making him the fifth-fastest swimmer in the world for the calendar year, which earned him an individual berth in the 400 m event at the Olympics. O'Halloran came fourth in the 220 yd in a time of 2 min 9.2 s to earn a berth on the 4 × 200 m freestyle relay squad. With Rose, Henricks and Chapman regarded as certain selections for the final quartet, O'Halloran was expected to battle for the fourth relay position. At the end of the trials, Guthrie claimed that O'Halloran was "the find of the recently held Australian Championships and the future swimmer for Australia. I am confident that we did not see Kevin's best times this season."

=== 1956 Melbourne Olympics ===
Having arrived in Melbourne, O'Halloran was rested in the heats of the relay. Devitt, Chapman, Graham Hamilton and Garretty finished third in their heat behind Great Britain and the Soviet Union, and qualified fifth-fastest behind Japan and the United States. Australia led from the start and reached the midpoint of the race with a lead of 4.5 s. Hamilton swam a very slow third leg of 2 min 15.4 s and conceded 8.8 s to the British.

Australia's final quartet was much stronger, with Rose winning the 400 m freestyle, and Henricks and Devitt winning the gold and silver medals respectively in the 100 m freestyle. Devitt had forced his way into the team with his heat swim of 2 min 7.5 s, which was the second-fastest among all of the swimmers in the heats. With four of the five fastest individual swimmers in the calendar year for the event, Australia was heavily favoured to win the relay; Sports Illustrated predicted a world record and a victory margin of around 14 metres.

O'Halloran's inclusion at the expense of Chapman was the subject of controversy because Chapman had won bronze in the 100 m event and was the national 220 yd freestyle champion. O'Halloran's selection also broke up the team of Devitt, Rose, Chapman and Henricks, which had won the relay for New South Wales at the Australian Championships. O'Halloran led off and put Australia in the lead with an Olympic record time of 2 min 6.8 s, opening a gap of 0.7 s over the Soviet Union and 1.2 s over the United States. Australia steadily increased their lead as Devitt, Rose and Henricks set the three fastest splits in the race, quicker than all the non-Australian swimmers. O'Halloran's split was the fifth-fastest in the race; the Soviet anchor swimmer was the only non-Australian to swim faster, and only by 0.1 s. This resulted in Australia winning gold in a world record time of 8 min 23.6 s, almost eight seconds ahead of the second-place Americans and 13 ahead of the Soviets. The win made O'Halloran the first Western Australian to win any Olympic medal.

In his only individual event, O'Halloran qualified for the 400 m final, having won his heat in a time of 4 min 36.8 s, 0.5 s ahead of Japan's Koji Nonoshita. His heat was relatively slow, meaning that he was the sixth-fastest qualifier. Swimming from lane seven, O'Halloran cut almost 4 s off his personal best to lose the bronze medal to the United States' George Breen by 0.4 s, in a race won by Rose. O'Halloran reduced Breen's margin by 1.3 s in the last 100 m, but it was not enough as he finished in a time of 4 min 32.9 s. O'Halloran returned to Perth after the Olympics to be welcomed by a motorcade and a civic reception. He was named as one of the five Western Australian Sportspeople of the Year in recognition of his winning performance.

== Later years and death ==
In 1958, O'Halloran's parents travelled across the continent to watch him swim at the Australian Championships in Sydney, but a recurring ear infection hindered his performances. He missed selection for the 1958 British Empire and Commonwealth Games in Cardiff and retired after the long car journey back across the Nullarbor. O'Halloran then worked full-time on the family property.

O'Halloran died in Kojonup on 5 July 1976, aged 39. His body was discovered next to a rifle, near a fence on the property; he had tripped as he climbed through the fence, and accidentally shot himself.

The 50 m pool in Kojonup was named the Kevin O'Halloran Memorial Pool in his honour. He was posthumously inducted into the Western Australian Hall of Champions.

== See also ==
- List of Olympic medalists in swimming (men)
- World record progression 4 × 200 metres freestyle relay
