= Edna Davey =

Australian swimmer

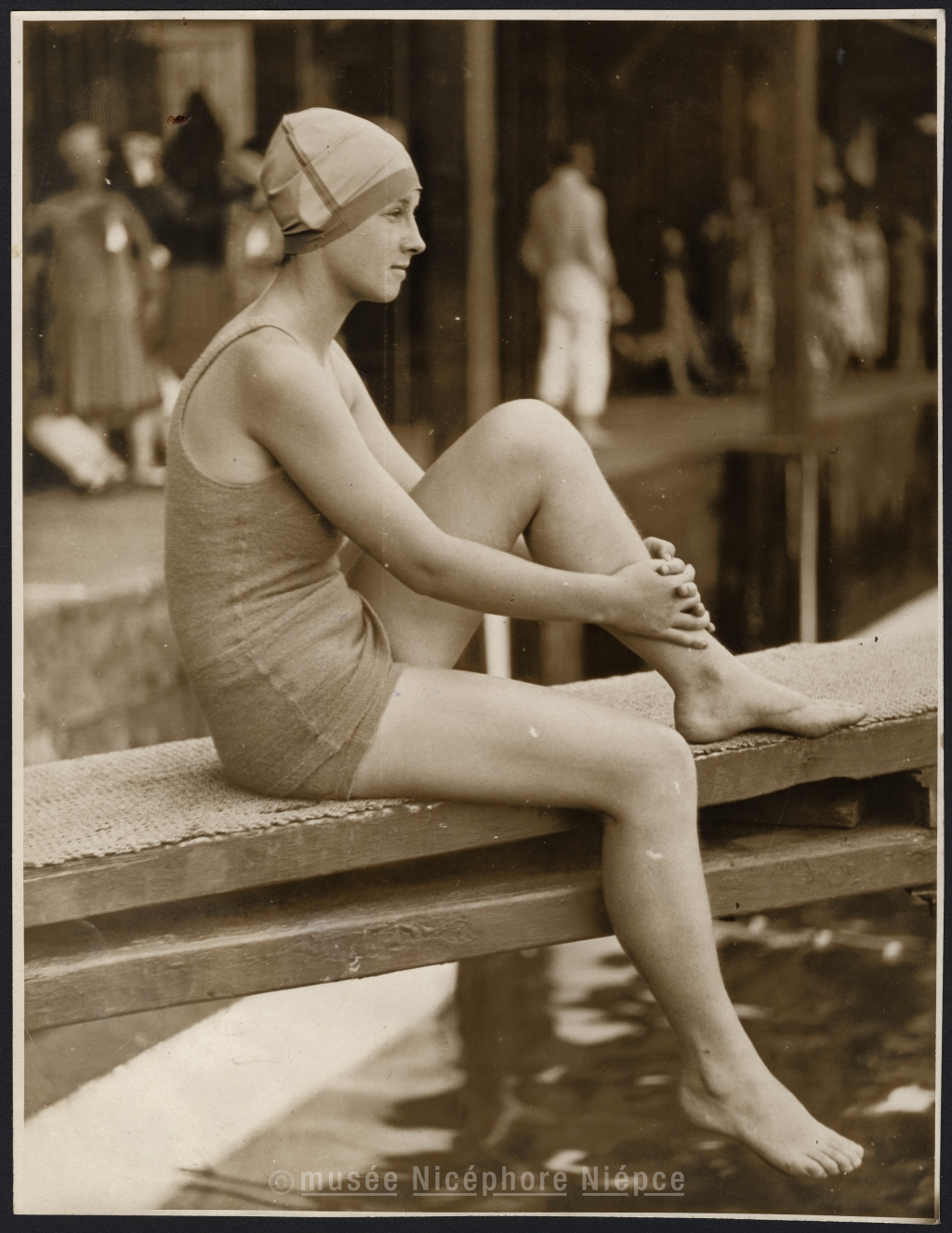

Personal information
- Born: 24 July 1909 London, England
- Died: 2000 (aged 90–91)

Sport
- Sport: Swimming
- Strokes: freestyle

Edna May Davey (24 July 1909 – 2000), later Eaton, and then Hamilton, was an Australian freestyle swimmer. She competed in two events at the 1928 Summer Olympics.

Davey set a world record of 15min 46 4-5sec for 1,000 metres at Domain Baths, Sydney in 1929.

In 1930 she married cricketer Ronald Eaton, but was divorced in 1934. She married Harry Hamilton in 1936. Their son, Graham Hamilton competed in the men's 4 × 200 metre freestyle relay at the 1956 Summer Olympics.
