= Charles "Sparky" Kawamoto =

American swim coach

- Charles Kawamoto

Biographical details
- Born: July 6, 1908; Hilo, Territory of Hawaii, U.S.
- Died: April 7, 1982 (aged 73); Hilo, Hawaii, U.S.

Coaching career (HC unless noted)
- 1935-1950's: Schinmachi Town Swim Club; Hilo Aquatics Club
- 1951-1970's: Hilo High School
- 1956: U.S. Olympic Team; Asst. Coach

Accomplishments and honors

Awards
- Hawaii Sportsman of the Year (1952); Hawaii Swimming Hall of Fame (2002)

Charles "Sparky" Kiyoichi Kawamoto (July 6, 1908 – April 7, 1982) was an American swimming coach. Kawamoto was most notable for coaching Yoshi Oyakawa who won the gold medal in the men's 100-meter backstroke at the 1952 Summer Olympics.

In the 1930s, Kawamoto founded the Hilo Aquatic Club in Hilo, Hawaii. After World War II, Kawamoto became a head coach for the Hilo High School swimming team. Kawamoto also coached Olympic swimmer Sonny Tanabe who helped the United States win a silver medal in the men's 4x200 meter freestyle relay at the 1956 Summer Olympics.

== Early life ==
Kawamoto was born in Hilo, Hawaii on July 6, 1908, to Seki Kawamoto and Annie Hila. He graduated from Hilo High School in 1928, where he would later coach. After high school, Kawamoto played in the Big Island Barefoot Football League from 1928 to 1934 where he played for the Waiakea Pirates and won league championships. Kawamoto would also coach football and play baseball.

== Coaching ==
Though he initially knew little about swimming, Kawamoto started the Shinmachi Town Swimming Club in the mid-1930s, which became the highly competitive Hilo Aquatics Club in the 1940s. Kawamoto would turn over coaching the club to Ed Kawachika, one of his most successful swimmers in the mid-1950s. In his early years, prior to having access to pools, Kawamoto used the Wailoa River for training, and Hilo Wharf and Radio Bay, just off the Eastern Hilo coast, where there is presently a yacht harbor, to hold swim meets. The team was sometimes referenced as the Wailoa River Club. By the mid to late 1940s, Hilo Aquatics met at the Naval Air Station Pool at the old Hilo Airport.

In 1951, he coached at Hilo High School, a highly successful team that produced two Olympians and several All Americans. Kawamoto would take Hilo High School to several Hawaii Territorial State Championships but would have challenges winning consistently against powerful teams from Honolulu, such as Punahou. Kawamoto told his swimmers there were three aspects to success; discipline, rigid training, and the "fighting spirit." He would have a fifty-year career in swimming, with much of it as an unpaid volunteer. Local YMCA official and coach Yoshita Segawa described Kawamoto as "a guy from the street who wound up with a coach's dream by training small town kids to become world class competitors."

== Outstanding swimmers ==
Yoshi Oyakawa, who became Kawamoto's greatest protege, and Hawaii's first Olympic gold medal winner, swam with Kawamoto at the Hilo Aquatics Club beginning around the age of 16, and briefly at Hilo High School. Oyakawa won a gold medal in the 100-meter backstroke at the 1952 Helsinki Olympics.

Sonny Tanabe, who Kawamoto also trained at Hilo High School and the Hilo Aquatics Club, competed for the U.S. in the preliminary heats of the 1956 Olympic men's silver medal-winning 4×200-meter freestyle relay. Kawamoto coached both Oyakawa and Tanabe in the 1952 Olympic trials in Detroit, Michigan.

Other outstanding swimmers include Edward Kawachika, who swam for Hilo High and would coach and captain The Ohio State University's swim team, Dennis Baker, who swam freestyle for Hilo High and set freestyle sprint records, Laurence Kaholo Hao, a national level competitor who swam for Hilo High and Indiana University, Masami Takahata, who swam for Kawamoto's Wailoa AA Club in the 1940s, Yoshinobu Terada, a national level swimmer who competed for Kawamoto's Wailoa Club in the 1940s, Joe Kalua, who swam for Hilo High in the 1950s, Walter Silva Jr., Roy Tanabe, Curtis and Robert Carlsmith, national level competitors who swam for Honolulu's Punahou Prep School, Carl Fujita who swam for Hilo High, and Masa Onuma, a Hilo High freestyle and distance swimmer who competed nationally.

== Retirement career ==
Kawamoto retired from his job selling hardware at American Factors (AMFAC) in 1972 but continued coaching and conducting swimming classes for children. In 1973, he started a swimming-based exercise program for retired Hawaiians at the Senior Program of the Parks and Recreation Department. The program, which attracted wide attention in Hawaii, was named "aquathenics". In addition to providing greater mobility and recreation to seniors, it aided stroke patients and provided therapeutic benefit for handicapped individuals.

Kawamoto died at Hilo Hospital on April 7, 1982. He was survived by his wife Haruko, three sons, a daughter, and seven grandchildren. He participated in the East Hawaii Kiwanis Club, the Kaumana Gardens Kumiai, as well as Hilo's Orchid Society.

== Honors ==
In 1952, Kawamoto along with Yoshi Oyakawa were named Hawaii's Sportsmen of the Year. Kawamoto received a citation from the County Board of Supervisors in 1956, and Honolulu mayor Neal Blaisdell presented him with a civic award in the same year.

As a lasting tribute, the Ho'olulu Swim Stadium, was renamed the Sparky Kawamoto Swim Stadium in his honor in 1981. The pool is Olympic-sized and includes a diving tower. Several hundred swim supporters signed a petition requesting the name change which was approved by the Hawaii County Council, and an official ceremony was held with Hawaii County mayor Herbert Matayoshi on January 30, 1982 to unveil the sign designating the new name of the stadium. Kawamoto was present at the ceremonies that honored him but was in failing health. He served as an advisor when the county was planning the pool, which was constructed at a cost of around one million, and served as a venue for state and international swimming events.

Kawamoto was posthumously inducted into the Hawaii Swimming Hall of Fame in its inaugural year in 2002.

In 2025, Charles Kawamoto was posthumously inducted into the Big Island Sports Hall of Fame.
