= Albert Manliguis =

American basketball coach (born 1930)

Albert "Al" Manliguis
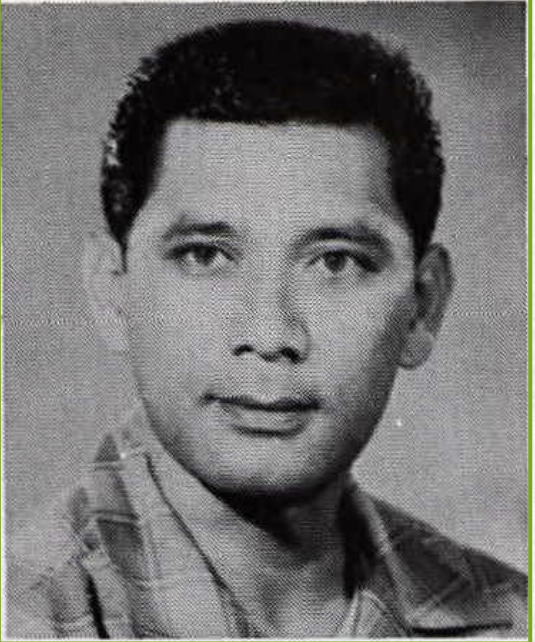
- Albert "Al" Manliguis
- Born: April 1930 (age 96)
- Occupation: Basketball Coach
- Spouse: Grace Kawamoto (married 1956-2016)
- Children: 8

Albert Manliguis (born April 1930) is an American retired basketball coach at Hilo High School who was inducted into the Big Island Sports Hall of Fame. Under Al's coaching, Hilo High School won numerous championships.

== Biography ==
=== Early life ===
Albert Manliguis was born in Onomea, Hawai'i in April 1930.

Al grew up playing basketball in the sugar plantation leagues. He played basketball for Hilo High School. In 1948, Al was voted Most Valuable Player at the Hawai'i Territorial Basketball Tournament (Shriners Interisland Interscholastic Invitational Tournament).

Albert Manliguis attended the University of Hawai'i at Manoa and played for the University of Hawai'i Rainbows basketball team as a starter for four years. In 1954, he was named the team's "Most Inspirational Player."

Albert Manliguis graduated from the University of Hawai'i with a degree in Physical Education.

In August 1954, Private Albert Manliguis was named "Trainee of the Week" of Company E at the Hawai'i Infantry Training center.

=== Marriage and children ===
In 1955, Al Manliguis married Grace Kawamoto. They had eight children and multiple grandchildren and great-grandchildren. Al and Grace Manliguis were married for sixty-one years until her death in 2016.

== Career ==
In 1956, Albert Manliguis returned to Hawai'i Island and coached basketball at Laupahoehoe High School.

In 1958, Al began coaching basketball at Hilo High School. He was a basketball coach, teacher, and counselor at Hilo High School. He also coached the school's bowling team and volunteered with the Boy Scouts. Al also taught driver's education classes.

Under Al's coaching, Hilo High School won 19 Big Island Interscholastic Federation (BIIF) Basketball Championships, and one state championship. He is credited with more than 500 wins.

Al Manliguis was a basketball coach at Hilo High School for 26 years. Al retired from coaching basketball at Hilo High School in 1984.

After retirement, Al volunteered for the Hawai'i Prostate Cancer Coalition's UsTOO East Hawai'i Chapter.

== Recognition ==
- Under Al Manliguis' coaching, Hilo High School won Big Island Interscholastic Federation (BIIF) Basketball Championships in 1959, 1961, 1962, 1963, 1964, 1966, 1967, 1968, 1969, 1970. 1971, 1972, 1973, 1975, 1976, 1977, 1978, 1980, and 1981, and one Hawai'i High School Athletic Association (HHSAA) State Basketball Championship in 1964. He is credited with more than 500 wins.
- In 1984, Al retired from coaching basketball at Hilo High School. Sports writer, Andy Baclig, wrote a tribute in honor of Al Manliguis.
- In 1997, Al was diagnosed with prostate cancer. Shortly after his diagnosis, Al became the “right hand man” to the president of the Hawai’i Prostate Cancer Coalition's UsTOO East Hawai’i chapter. Al became the president of the chapter in 2007. In 2007, Al was awarded the American Cancer Society's Quality of Life award “for helping to improve the quality of life for prostate cancer patients and their families in East Hawai’i.” Al has been the president of the Hawai’i Prostate Cancer Coalition's UsTOO East Hawai’i chapter from 2007 until 2020 when the COVID-19 pandemic started.
- Al Manliguis was inducted into the Big Island Sports Hall of Fame.
- In 2005, Albert Manliguis was included in a book called, “The Lessons of Aloha: Stories of the Human Spirit."
- In 2012, Al Manliguis was honored as a Distinguished Alumni Honoree by the Hilo High School Foundation.
- In 2019, sports writer, Bart Wright, wrote an article about Al Manliguis and his brother, Larry, and their legacy.
- In 2023, sports writer, John Burnett, wrote an article about Al and Larry Manliguis, describing all of their accomplishments.
- Hawai'i County Mayor Mitch Roth proclaimed January 6, 2024, "Coach Larry and Al Manliguis Day" in Hawai'i County.
