= Manuel dos Santos (swimmer) =

Brazilian swimmer (born 1939)

Manoel dos Santos
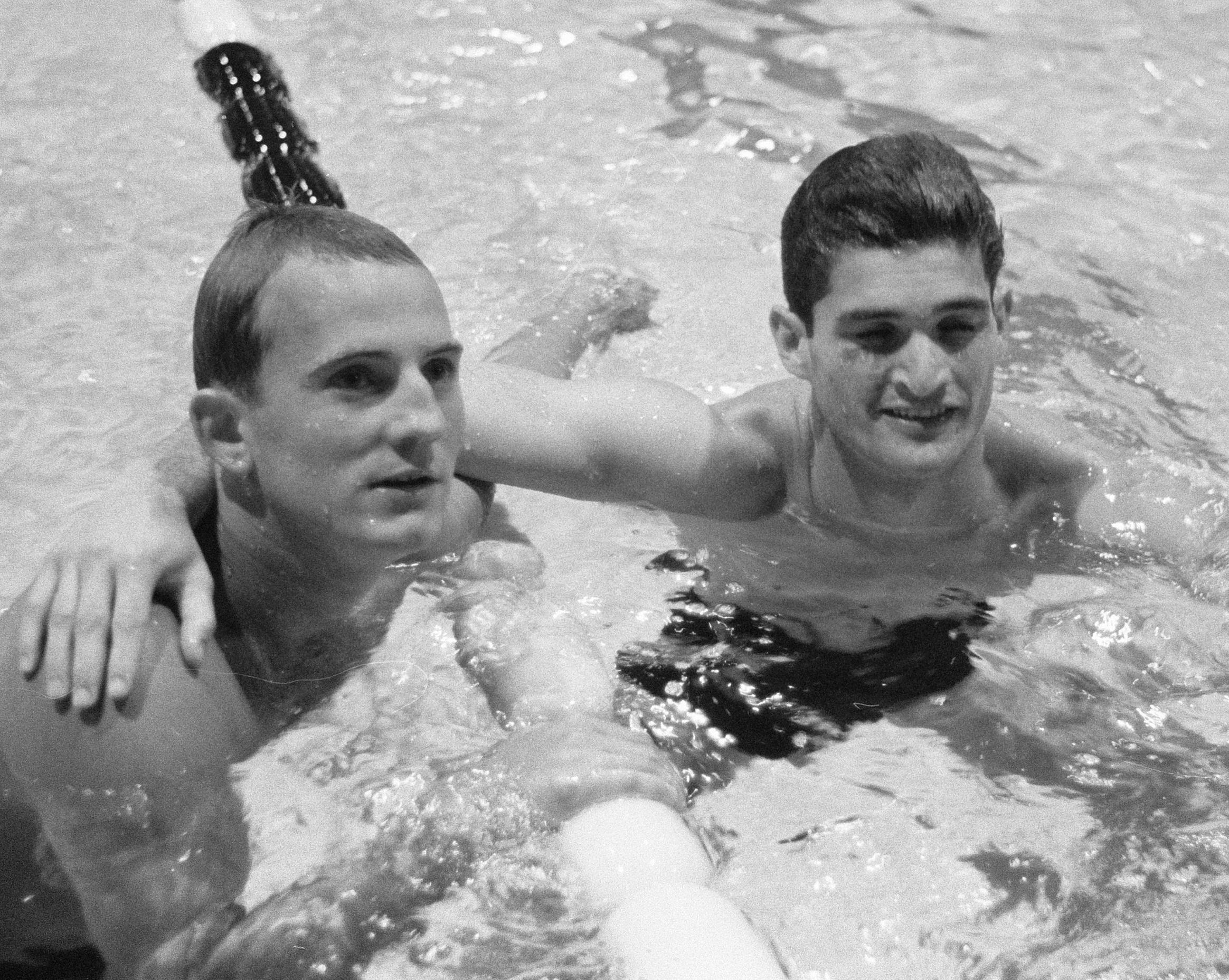
- Manoel dos Santos (right) at the 1960 Olympics

Personal information
- Full name: Manoel dos Santos Júnior
- Nationality: Brazil
- Born: 22 February 1939 (age 87) Guararapes, São Paulo, Brazil

Sport
- Sport: Swimming
- Strokes: Freestyle
Medal record
Representing Brazil
Olympic Games
Bronze medal – third place	1960 Rome	100 m freestyle

Manoel dos Santos Júnior (born 22 February 1939) is a Brazilian former swimmer, former world record holder and a bronze medalist in 100-metre freestyle at the Olympic Games in Rome in 1960.

== Early life ==
At 4 years of age, Manoel spent months in a hospital, recovering from recurrent threats of pneumonia and similar diseases, that his body suffered. His father saw in swimming the salvation of that drama. Before completing eleven years old, in early 1950, Manoel was studying in Rio Claro, in the Gymnasium Koelle, a German college. The boy found himself away from his family, which he saw only on holidays and "holy week", when he took the train to the western state. There in Rio Claro, the rigid routine of the college, Manoel fits well with the swimming program. In a 20-meter pool, under the guidance of Bruno Buch, his first master, he began to train, compete and make the team gym.

The strongest swimmer of the group was a boy three years older than Manoel, named João Gonçalves Filho, future champion and South American record holder in the backstroke and an athlete in various sports, who participated in various Olympic Games.

== International career ==
=== 1955–1960 ===
In 1955, Manoel dos Santos approached the national top. He swam backstroke, and his training was more focused in this style. In the 100-meter freestyle, Brazil was in a time of transition in national leadership. The top three sprinters in the country at the turn of the decade and early 1950s (Aram Boghossian, Sérgio Rodrigues and Plauto Guimarães) had retired. Paulo Catunda and Haroldo Lara were the fastest at this time. Lara was the best swimmer in the country until 1957, when he retired, moved to Italy and became an opera singer.

In March 1955, at age 16, Manoel was summoned to his first international competition, the II Pan American Games in Mexico City. At this time, athletes were still amateurs. In Mexico, after a trip into a military aircraft, a DC-3, which lasted four days, with overnight in Belém, Trinidad and Tobago and Cuba, Manoel competed very poorly. His main memory of the tournament was the moment he left desolate of proof, fell on a nearby heating pool and pretending to be loosening up, cried a lot, solitude, until the last tear is lost hidden in the middle of chlorine.

At the 1955 Pan American Games in Mexico City, he finished 4th in the 4 × 100-metre medley.

The following year, on February 56, in Viña del Mar, Chile, was the thirteenth edition of the South American Swimming Championships. At the previous twelve, Brazil defeated Argentina only once, in the same Viña del Mar, in 1941. Manoel dos Santos ranked fifth in the final of the 100-metre freestyle, and Haroldo Lara took the fourth position. In the 200-metre backstroke, Manoel was fourth and the race was won by his compatriot João Gonçalves. In the 4x100-metre freestyle relay, the competition had a spectacular end. Peru team was the gold medalist, with a time of 3:59.7, a championship record. A tenth of a second ago, silver medalist, arrived Brazil. The Argentines came in third, nine-tenths of a second behind Brazil. The Brazilian relay team had Haroldo Lara, Manoel dos Santos, João Gonçalves and Aristarco de Oliveira. In partial takes, Manoel was the fastest of the four. He stated that, at that moment, he realized that his specialty and future were the 100-metre freestyle, and the backstroke was just a byproduct. This flare, this awareness of where his true talent lay resulted in a short time, a leap of improvement. As for the South American, as expected, porteños took the title again.

In November 1956, at the new pool of CR Vasco da Gama, Manoel dos Santos failed to get Olympic qualification, by two tenths of a second.

In 1957, finishing the secondary school in Rio Claro, Manoel dos Santos moved to Santos, São Paulo. The choice of the new city was due to Minoru Hirano, his new coach, teacher, and almost a father. Hirano entered to swimming by the paths of the translation service, carried out during the stay of the "Flying Fish" in Brazil in 1950. Hirano got much swimming knowledge, monitoring and deciphering the Japanese Olympians and world record holders. In the late 50s, the footage of the training, even in Brazil, began to increase substantially. Hirano was against the current. He did Manoel swim a thousand meters and then working leg, positioning stroke, angle etc. chin, and finished with a half dozen shots of 25m. Often he could not attend the training, and Manoel came alone to the session with a little paper in hand, or the sequence decorated into his head.

In December 1957, Manoel broke the Brazilian record of Haroldo Lara, and the South American record of Argentine Pedro Galvao in Santos, on 25 meter pool (still valid in that year), with a time of 56.5. Further, in February 1958, was held the South American Championships in Montevideo. For the first time in the history of the tournament, the winner of the 100-metre freestyle won the race handily, not in the beat of hand, but two and a half seconds ahead of, or fifteen feet away - Manoel dos Santos. The only Brazilian besides Armando Freitas in 1939, to win the gold. The silver medal went to nearly invincible Ismael Martínez Merino, Peruvian three times champion in 52, 54 and 56. The Manoel's time in qualifying, 56.6, represented new South American record, as from 1958, all international federations officiated the rule of consider valid only records obtained in 50 meter pool.

The following year, came the first trip to the United States. The beds in the Olympic village assembled at the University of Chicago, were those of American soft mattress, strange and uncomfortable for someone who grew up sleeping on a hard bed of boarding school. The body aching, and barely slept, and back that do not reared more, affected the balance of swimming. Manoel dos Santos, the great hope of the Brazilian Swimming to win a medal at the Pan American Games in 1959, got only a fourth place in the 100-metre freestyle, swimming above the 58s, when expectations revolved around the 56s. The Manoel's curriculum, regarding Pans, was forever beyond the means of his talent. After Mexico 55 and Chicago 59, Manoel not arrive until São Paulo 63.

At the 1959 Pan American Games, in Chicago, he finished 4th in the 100-metre freestyle. He also swam the 4 × 100-metre medley.

In February 1960, Santos went to the South American Championship in Cali, Colombia. In the altitude, his times were not very good. But Manoel dos Santos fulfilled its role fairly, taking the gold in the 100m freestyle and leading the Brazilian relays to win two golds and a silver. The battle against the Argentines was very fierce, both the female and the male. In the end, Brazil won the first championship in history.

In 1960, Manoel dos Santos was swimmer of the Pinheiros. But he continued to follow the guidelines determined by your Hirano technician, from Santos. He used the Pinheiros pool, and sometimes the Corinthians pool, during the summer and in the winter, down the hill and gave their strokes in the Clube de Regatas Internacional. In July 60, during the pre-Olympic final preparations, in Rio de Janeiro, Manoel convincingly broke his South American record of the 100-metre freestyle, with a time of 55.6. This achievement has positioned him as a strong competitor to the Olympic medal in Rome.

=== 1960 Summer Olympics ===
On his way to the 1960 Olympics dos Santos contracted tonsillitis during the Brazilian teams stop in Portugal. He was put on antibiotics and had only a few days to recover before the heats of the 100-metre freestyle, the traditional opening race of the Olympic program at that time.

In Rome, dos Santos won his heat with a time of 56.3, the third-equal best time overall. Twenty-four swimmers qualified for the semi-finals with the slowest qualifier at 58.2. dos Santos also won his semi-final, with his time of 56.3 being the fourth fastest, ranking behind Americans Lance Larson and Bruce Hunter and Australian John Devitt, whose times were 55.5, 55.7 and 55.8, respectively. The eighth and final qualifier for the final was Canadian Dick Pound, later head of the World Anti-Doping Agency.

In the final the next day dos Santos led at the turn but eventually finished third in a time of 55.4, new South American record, to claim the bronze medal. The awarding of the gold medal to Devitt ahead of Larson remains one of the most troubled decisions in the history of Olympic swimming.

=== 1961 and later career ===
At the Brazilian Championship in 1961 dos Santos took silver in the 100-metre freestyle with a time of 57.8, a second behind the winner, Athos de Oliveira. Later the same year, at the Japanese Championships in Tokyo, he won his heat, semi-final and final, with times of 55.1, 55.2 and 55.3, respectively. His time of 55.1 was a new South American record. He lowered the South American record by another tenth of a second, to 55.0, at a meeting in Nagoya. At the American championships in Los Angeles on 18 August 1961, dos Santos was fourth in the race which saw American Steve Clark break the world record with 54.4.

On 21 September 1961, in Rio de Janeiro, alone in the swimming pool of Club de Regatas Guanabara, dos Santos set a new world record for the 100-metre freestyle with a time of 53.6 seconds.

dos Dantos was the South American champion for eleven years between 1958 and 1969.

== See also ==
- World record progression 100 metres freestyle

Records
Preceded by Stephen Clark	Men's 100 metre freestyle world record holder (long course); 20 September 1961 – 13 September 1964	Succeeded by Alain Gottvallès
