= Robert A. Royer =

American swimmer

Robert Royer
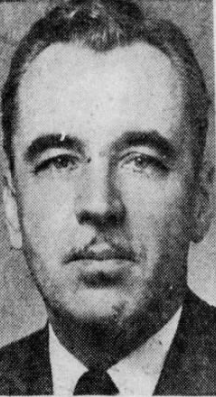
- Royer, 1940s

Biographical details
- Born: September 22, 1902; Akron, Indiana, US
- Died: December 6, 1957 (aged 55); Bloomington, Indiana, US
- Education: Indiana University Bloomington

Playing career
- c. 1924-1928: Indiana University Bloomington
- Position: backstroke

Coaching career (HC unless noted)
- 1931-1957: Indiana University Swimming
- 1956: U.S. Olympic Team; Advisor

Accomplishments and honors

Championships
- 1956 6th Place (NCAA); 1957 4th Place (NCAA); 1956 3rd Place (Big 10); 1957 4th Place (Big 10)

Robert A. Royer was an American competitive swimmer for Indiana University Bloomington in the 1920s and later served as Head Coach of their swim team from 1931 to 1957, leading them to a fourth-place finish in the NCAA Championship in 1957, and a third place in the competitive Big 10 Conference in 1956. He coached Indiana University's first NCAA swimming champion, Bill Woolsey, and their first two Olympic swimmers, Woolsey, and Sonny Tanabe who competed in 1956.

== Early life ==
Royer as Indiana Swimmer, 1927

Royer was born to Reuben and Nerla A. Hoffman Royer in a log cabin in Akron, Indiana on September 22, 1902. He swam for Indiana University from around 1924-1928 under Coach Paul Thompson, and received a Varsity letter, graduating in 1928 with an A.B. in English. In competition at Indiana, Royer was a consistent winner in the backstroke, and had beaten backstroke competitors from University of Chicago, University of Illinois, and Perdue.

At 33, Royer married his wife Catherine Edwards, 21, an Indiana native, on Sunday, August 17, 1936, at the home of Catherine's parents in Windfall, Indiana. At Indiana, Catherine served as the alumni advisor to Theta Sigma Phi, the national professional journalistic society for women.

== Coaching Indiana ==
After teaching and serving as an Assistant Principal at Akron High School in his hometown of Akron, Indiana, for three years, he began coaching at Indiana University in 1931 and continued through 1957 when his coaching years ended following an eight-month illness after a surgery.

Royer was responsible for bringing the Indiana swim team to national recognition, through achieving top five finishes in national and major regional championships and helping to produce two U.S. Olympic swimmers. Bringing greater national attention to the team at the end of his coaching tenure, he brought Indiana to a sixth-place finish in the 1956 NCAA Championships, and then a fourth-place finish in the NCAA swimming Championship in 1957 at the University of North Carolina, Chapel Hill, behind swimming powers University of Michigan, coached by Gus Stager, and Yale.

In 1956 he led Indiana to a Big 10 Conference finish of a third-place tie. The team had a fourth-place finish at the Big 10 swimming Championships in Minneapolis in March 1957, with Head Coach Macaffree's Michigan State Spartans taking first. Royer coached the swim team continuously except for two seasons when he performed administrative duties for the university. One of Royer's greatest achievements was briefly mentoring Assistant Coach Doc Counsilman, and recruiting and training a talented team that had steadily improved in the years before Cousilman assumed head coaching status.

On May 15, 1948, Royer taught a Water Safety Institute Seminar sponsored by the American Red Cross to teachers of swimming and life saving at Butler University in Indianapolis in conjunction with the Coaches of Perdue and the Rivera Swim Club. He would conduct and attend other swimming institutes during his time as a coach. On the evening of January 11, 1954, sharing tips on his second career, he gave a lecture on free lance writing for magazines at Aterbury Center as part of their cultural lecture series.

=== Outstanding swimmers ===
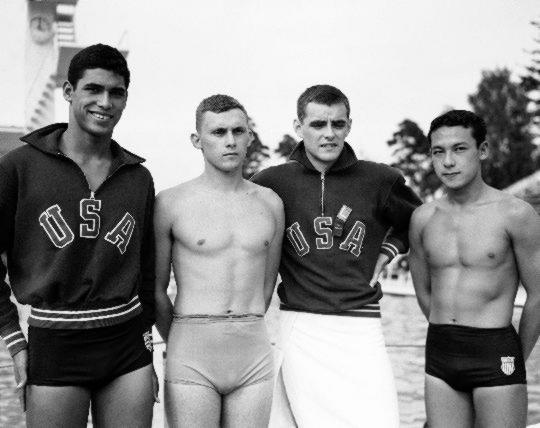
1952 Olympic Gold 4×200 relay team, Woolsey (far left)

Outstanding swimmers, though they came at the end of Royer's tenure, included Bill Woolsey, Richard "Sonny" Tanabe of Hawaii, and Frank McKinney Jr. who were all members of the U.S. 1956 Olympic team. Woolsey and McKinney were both Olympic medalists. Woolsey was Indiana's first NCAA champion, receiving the honor twice. He won a total of four AAU titles and was a recipient of All-American honors on eight occasions. As an Indiana junior in 1956, he won Big Ten titles in the 220-, 440- and 1,650-yard freestyles and NCAA titles in the 220 and 440. Woolsey was the first Olympic swimmer from Indiana University. He swam for the U.S. at the 1952 Helsinki Summer Olympics, capturing a gold medal in the 4×200-meter freestyle relay. His relay team consisted of Wayne Moore, Ford Konno, and James McLane. At the 1952 games, Woolsey competed in the 1500-meter freestyle. At the 1956 Summer Olympics in Melbourne, after receiving coaching from Indiana Coaches Royer and Assistant Coach Counselman, Woolsey won a silver medal swimming the 800-meter freestyle relay. Ron Honda was another outstanding swimmer from Hawaii for Royer's Indiana team.

Royer's swimmer Sonny Tanabe, another outstanding Hawaiian, was on the Silver medal 4x100 meter freestyle relay team in the 1956 Olympics, but did not medal, as he did not swim in the finals.

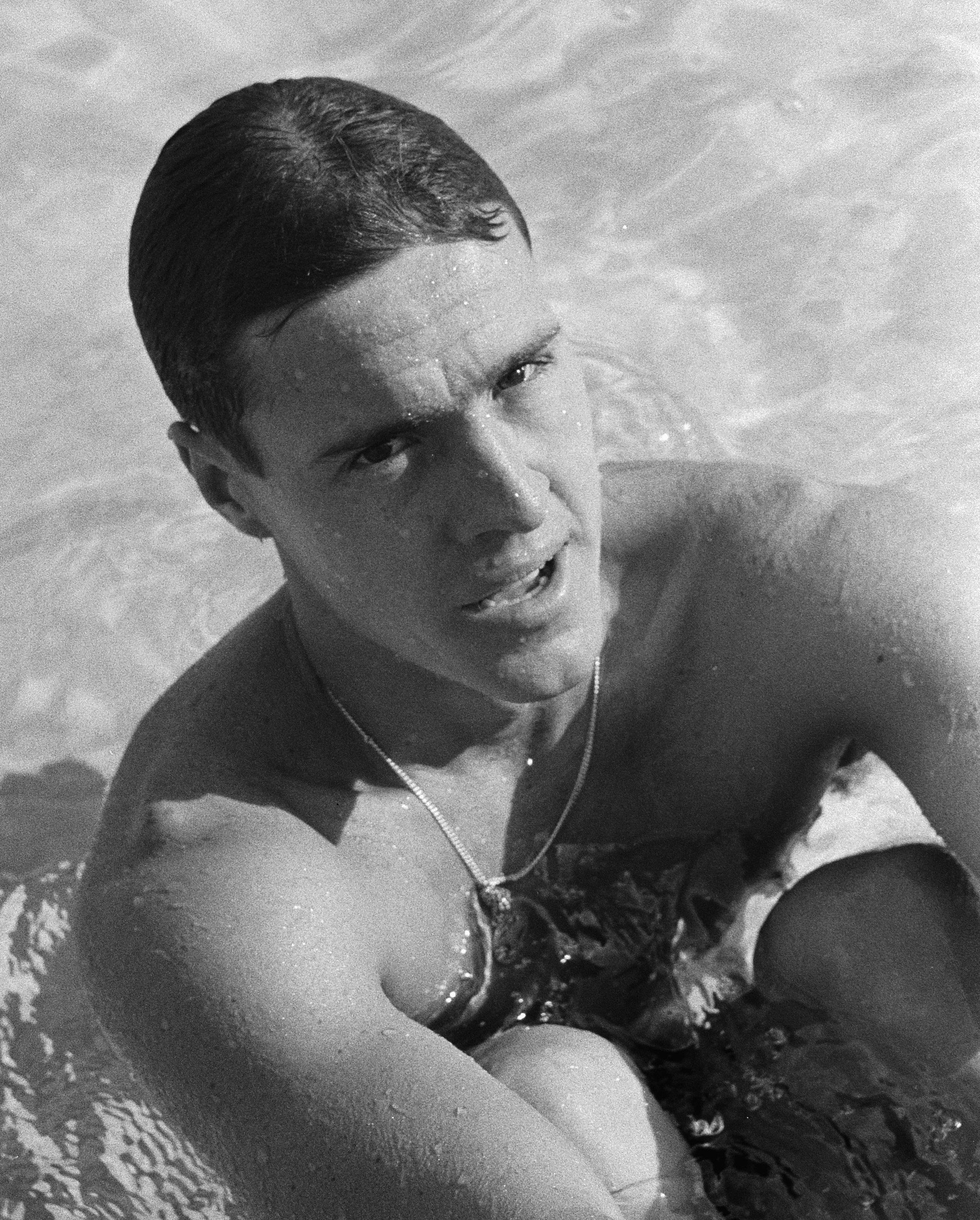
Frank McKinney Jr.

Royer's Fall 1957 Freshman recruits included Frank McKinney Jr., with near world record times in the 200-meter backstroke, one of Royer's former strokes. At 18, prior to swimming for Indiana, McKinney won a bronze medal in the 1956 Olympics in the 100-meter backstroke, and a silver in the 100-meter backstroke in the 1960 Olympics, as well as taking a gold medal in the 4x100-meter relay. Royer was unable to provide multiple years of coaching to McKinney due to his illness, but likely was involved in recruiting him. McKinney, who was coached primarily by Doc Counsilman as an Upperclassman at Indiana won titles with the American Athletic Union and took two NCAA championships for Indiana. In 1959 he twice set a world record for the 200-meter backstroke, and in 1960 he was a member, on two occasions, of teams which posted new world records in the medley relay.

Royer also served as Men's Assistant Dean at Indiana during his tenure with the university. He wrote as a hobby and submitted many articles to wide-selling magazines. He resided on a farm near Bloomington.

=== Work in the swimming community ===
Royer served as Chair of the National Collegiate Athletic Association's Rules Committee. He had served as an advisor to the 1956 U.S. Olympic team. In 1955, as an NCAA Rules Chairman, he was partly responsible for maintaining the ability of college swimmers to serve as lifeguards and playground attendants while maintaining amateur athletic status, however working independently as swim instructors would not be permitted. He served as a top official and starter with University of Michigan swimming Coach Charles McCaffree, Jr. at the annual YMCA Swimming and Diving Championships in Richmond, Indiana, in April 1957.

He died at 55 at his home in the Bloomington area on December 6, 1957. He had married the former Catherine Margarette Edwards in 1936. Catherine had served as a secretary to University President Herman Wells for ten years. Royer had been ill since an operation around eight months prior to his death. The couple had a young daughter. A funeral was held on December 9, and Royer was buried in Valhalla Gardens in Bloomington, Indiana.

The Robert Royer Pool on 7th Street in Bloomington was dedicated to Royer in his honor by the university's Board of Trustrees. Built around 1960, the pool is housed in the School of Public Health and is used recreationally by students and faculty, though it was once used for competition as it has a viewing area with a 500-person seating capacity. In March, 1962, the pool hosted the Big Ten Championship, and was officially dedicated by President Herman Wells, Indiana's Athletic Director Bill Orwig, and other speakers during the weekend of the event. It is a six-lane pool, 75-yards in length, with a separate diving well, and features many photos of Indiana swimming teams.
