= Vladimir Struzhanov =

Russian swimmer (1932–2014)

Personal information
- Born: August 2, 1932
- Died: April 19, 2014 (aged 81)

Sport
- Sport: Swimming
Medal record
Representing the Soviet Union
Olympic Games
Bronze medal – third place	1956 Melbourne	4x200 m freestyle relay
European Championships
Gold medal – first place	1958 Budapest	4x200m freestyle relay

Vladimir Struzhanov (2 August 1932 – 19 April 2014) was a Russian swimmer who competed in the 1956 Summer Olympics.
