= Sergio Martínez (swimmer) =

Colombian swimmer

Personal information
- Born: 1936 (age 89–90)

Sport
- Sport: Swimming

Sergio Martínez (born November 1936) is a Colombian former swimmer. He competed in the men's 100 metre freestyle at the 1956 Summer Olympics.
