= Gary Chapman (swimmer) =

Australian swimmer

- Chapman in 1956

Personal information
- Full name: Gary Arthur Chapman
- National team: Australia
- Born: 12 March 1938 Brighton-Le-Sands, New South Wales
- Died: 23 September 1978 (aged 40) Near Little Bay, New South Wales

Sport
- Sport: Swimming
- Strokes: Freestyle
Medal record
Representing Australia
Olympic Games
| Bronze medal – third place | 1956 Melbourne | 100 m freestyle |
British Empire and Commonwealth Games
| Gold medal – first place | 1954 Vancouver | 440 yd freestyle |
| Gold medal – first place | 1954 Vancouver | 4×220 yd freestyle |
| Gold medal – first place | 1958 Cardiff | 4×220 yd freestyle |
| Gold medal – first place | 1958 Cardiff | 4×110 yd medley |
| Silver medal – second place | 1958 Cardiff | 110 yd freestyle |
| Bronze medal – third place | 1954 Vancouver | 1650 yd freestyle |

Gary Arthur Chapman (12 March 1938 – 23 September 1978) was an Australian freestyle swimmer of the 1950s who won a bronze medal in the 100-metre freestyle at the 1956 Summer Olympics in Melbourne. Although he had set a world record in the 220-yard freestyle, he was surprisingly omitted from the 4×200-metre freestyle relay team which won the gold medal.

Born in Brighton-Le-Sands, Sydney, Chapman first came to prominence in the 1952 Australian Championships, at the age of 14, when he cut 2.9 seconds off the 440-yard freestyle Australian record. In 1954, he sliced 12.8 seconds off the 880-yard record in qualifying for the Australian team at the 1954 Empire Games in Vancouver, where he won gold in the 440-yard freestyle and bronze in the 1650-yard freestyle. He also claimed gold in the 4×220-yard freestyle relay. In his era, the 220 and 880-yard freestyle were not contested as individual events.

Due to the rise of fellow Australian Murray Rose in distance freestyle swimming, Chapman switched to competing in the 110 yd and 220-yard freestyle events in a bid to increase his chances of success at the 1956 Olympics in Melbourne. Prior to the games, he defeated teammate Jon Henricks twice in the 220-yard freestyle, setting a world record on one of those occasions.

Due to the 200-metre freestyle not being an Olympic event, Chapman was forced to concentrate on the 100-metre freestyle. He won the bronze medal in 100-metre freestyle, finishing behind Henricks and another Australian, John Devitt. As the 220-yard freestyle world record, Chapman was snubbed by the selectors in the 4×200-metre freestyle relay, only swimming in the qualifying heats, but being replaced by Kevin O'Halloran in the final, where the Australians won the gold medal in a world record time. Under the rules of the time, heat swimmers were not entitled to gold medals.

Chapman continued in the sport despite this until the 1958 Empire Games in Cardiff, where he was edged out for gold in the 110-yard freestyle by Devitt, and managed to come only fifth in the 440-yard freestyle behind fellow Australian John Konrads. Chapman collected gold medals in the 4×220-yard freestyle and 4×110-yard medley relays.

Chapman retired after the 1958 Games. In 1978, he and a friend died after a boat belonging to him capsized near Little Bay, New South Wales, in the south of Sydney. Their bodies were never recovered.

== See also ==
- List of Commonwealth Games medallists in swimming (men)
- List of Olympic medalists in swimming (men)
- World record progression 4 × 100 metres freestyle relay
