= Sonny Tanabe =

American former competition swimmer (born 1932)

Personal information
- Full name: Richard Tsugio Tanabe Jr.
- Nickname: "Sonny"
- National team: United States
- Born: December 14, 1934 (age 91) Hilo, Hawaii, U.S.
- Height: 5 ft 9 in (1.75 m)
- Weight: 165 lb (75 kg)

Sport
- Sport: Swimming
- Strokes: Freestyle, Medley
- Club: Hilo Aquatic Club
- College team: Indiana University 1958
- Coach: Charles "Sparky" Kawamoto (Hilo Aquatics); Robert A. Royer; James Counsilman (Indiana)

Richard Tsugio Tanabe Jr. (born December 14, 1934), is a former American competition swimmer, teacher, and swim coach, who represented the United States at the 1956 Summer Olympics in Melbourne, Australia. A native Hawaiian, he taught and coached at the Kamehameha Schools outside Honolulu for over thirty years.

== Hilo High School ==
Sonny Tanabe was born on December 14, 1934 in Hilo, Hawaii. He attended Hilo High School and became a National Interscholastic All American in the consecutive years 1951 through 1953. He swam with the Hilo High Viking's swim team as early as February, 1951 where he was directed by the exceptional Coach Charles "Sparky" Kawamoto. Sonny received additional mentoring from Coach Kawamoto at the Hilo Aquatic Club, where he also competed and trained during his High School years and occasionally after. In a February 1951, Hilo High School home competition he swam with Hilo High teammate and future Olympian Yoshi Oyakawa, who lost to a strong McKinley High School team from Honolulu that included future Olympic medalists Ford Konno and William Woolsey.

At 17, in August 1952, swimming for the Hilo Club, Tanabe qualified for the AAU National Outdoor Swimming Championships in Newark, New Jersey, in the 110-yard backstroke, and finished seventh in the finals. He did better in the 330-yard Individual Medley placing third in the Championships on August 28, 1952, with the first place finisher Bumpy Jones swimming an American record of 3:54.8. On July 12, 1954, Tanabe competed with an outstanding Hawaiian team including Hawaiian Olympians Yoshi Oyakawa, Ford Konno, and Bill Woolsey in an International Invitational Swimming Meet against a highly-rated six-man National team from Japan at the NAS Pool in Hilo, Hawaii.

== Indiana University ==
At Indiana University where he swam for Coach Robert A. Royer, who excelled in backstroke competition as a swimmer at Indiana, and became an able instructor in a variety of strokes. From 1955 through 1957, Sonny was an NCAA All-American. In February, 1956, in a meet with the University of Michigan, he set an American record in the 200-yard individual medley of 2:10.3, which he lowered to 2:08.9 the following year in a meet with Iowa on March 2, 1957.

During his time at Indiana, in the 1956-57 season, he placed second nationally in the 200-yard individual medley in both the NCAA National Championships and Big Ten Conference. In the same year, he placed second in national competition in the 100-yard butterfly in the Big Ten Conference, and set an NCAA record in the event in 1957. In March 1956, Sonny and fellow Hawaiian swimmer Bill Woolsey, whom he had known since High School, were named Co-captains of the Indiana swim team for the 1957 season. Graduating in 1957, Tanabe earned a Bachelor of Science, in Health and Physical Education while at Indiana. In the 1957-58 school years, Tanabe was led by Hall of Fame Assistant Coach Doc Counsilman who would lead the team after the death of Head Coach Royer.

== 1956 Olympics ==
He swam for the silver medal-winning U.S. team in the preliminary heats of the men's 4×200-meter freestyle relay. Tanabe was not eligible to receive a medal under the 1956 Olympic swimming rules, however, because he did not swim in the relay final. Sonny swam in preliminary Heat 1, helping his team earn a time of 8:38.3, which placed them second, and put them in the top eight preliminary times, advancing them to the finals. The relay team swam an 8:31.5 in the finals, though Sonny did not compete. In preparation for the Olympics, Tanabe was trained by the well-known coach Soichi Sakamoto, an Olympic Assistant Coach during his preparation for the 1952 and 1956 Olympics.

Following the Olympics and college graduation, Tanabe enlisted in the United States Army from 1958-1960.

== Teaching and coaching ==
After completing a Masters Degree at Indiana in Physical Education, he stayed in the United States mainland, and worked directing aquatics and coaching swimming at Hinsdale High School outside Chicago from 1961-2.

=== Kamehameha Schools ===
By the mid-1960's, Tanabe returned to his native Hawaii to teach physical education and other subjects and coach swimming and Water Polo at Kamehameha Schools, at the main Kapalama Campus, Northeast of Honolulu, Oahu. He would continue his teaching career at Kamehameha Schools for over three decades, through the mid-90's. The current campus hosts a large gym and a new Olympic sized pool. The Honolulu Kamehmeha School had a new pool in 1965 and at an annual Honolulu Private School swim meet, hosted at Kamehmeha in February 1965, the school placed second to a powerful Punahou team in both the boy's and girl's division. Kamehameha Schools, in northern Honolulu, has a stated preference for accepting students of Native Hawaiian ancestry. Although originally located exclusively near Honolulu, Kamehameha Schools currently has campuses that support kindergarten through 12th grade in Pukalani, Maui, and Keaʻau, Hawaiʻi, and has pre-schools state wide.

After five years of swim coaching for the Varsity and Middle School teams at Kamehameaha, in the summer of 1972, due to heavy teaching responsibilities at Kamehameaha, Tanabe resigned as head swimming coach for the Varsity team, and was replaced by fellow Olympian and Indiana swim team mate William Woolsey. Tanabe was also a long term Water Safety Instructor for the American Red Cross, as well as a SCUBA Diving Instructor. He had a strong interest in spear fishing, and wrote Spearfishing on the Island of Hawaii in 2007.

Staying active in swimming, Tanabe tied for high point honors at an AAU Masters Swim Meet at the Punahou School pool in Honolulu in December 17, 1972. Tanabe continued to swim for fitness through his retirement and afterwards.

=== Honors ===
In 1955, Tanabe was inducted into the Indiana Swimming and Diving Hall of Fame. In the same year, he received the Balfore swimming and diving award. In February, 2024, Tanabe was presented with the Hoʻokahiko Award, for individuals who spent their careers preserving, and honoring the culture and traditions of Hawaii. The award was presented by Duke's Waikiki, a popular restaurant in Waikiki in Oahu.

=== Civic participation ===
Tanabe, who greatly contributed to civic life in Hawaii served in the following organizations:

- Aquatic Life and Wildlife Advisory Committee, County of Hawaii, 1995–99
- Island of Hawaii YMCA Corporate Board, Chairman Emeritus
- Island of Hawaii YMCA Aquatic Leadership and Ocean Resource Committee
- Past Chairman of Island of Hawaii YMCA Freedive Club
- Hawaii Freedive Spearfishing Association
- Chairman, 1998 Blue Water Spearfishing Symposium
- Co-chairman, Hawaii Freedive Spearfishing EXPO 2000
- Indiana University Swimming, Hawaii Alumni
- U.S. Olympian, Hawaii Chapter, Vice President

== See also ==
- List of Indiana University (Bloomington) people
