= Guido Elmi =

Italian swimmer

Personal information
- Born: 7 September 1935 Milan, Italy
- Died: 14 July 2018 (aged 82)

Sport
- Sport: Swimming

Guido Elmi (7 September 1935 – 14 July 2018) was an Italian swimmer. He competed in the men's 4 × 200 metre freestyle relay at the 1956 Summer Olympics.
