= Swimming at the 1959 Pan American Games – Men's 100 metre freestyle =

Men's 100 metre freestyle at the I959 Pan American Games
- Venue: -
- Dates: August 31 (preliminaries), September 2 (finals)

Medalists
Gold medal	Jeffrey Farrell	United States
Silver medal	Elton Follett	United States
Bronze medal	Bill Woolsey	United States

The men's 100 metre freestyle competition of the swimming events at the 1959 Pan American Games took place on 31 August (preliminaires) and 2 September (finals). The last Pan American Games champion was Clarke Scholes of US.

This race consisted of two lengths of the pool, both lengths being in freestyle.

== Results ==
All times are in minutes and seconds.

KEY:	q	Fastest non-qualifiers	Q	Qualified	GR	Games record	NR	National record	PB	Personal best	SB	Seasonal best

=== Heats ===
The first round was held on August 31.

Rank	Heat	Name	Nationality	Time	Notes
1	2	Jeffrey Farrell	United States	56.5	Q, GR
2	3	Elton Follett	United States	56.6	Q
3	4	Cameron Grout	Canada	57.2	Q
4	1	Bill Woolsey	United States	57.4	Q
5	2	Thomas Verth	Canada	57.7	Q
6	4	Manuel dos Santos	Brazil	58.1	Q
7	1	Francisco Carioba	Brazil	59.1	Q
8	4	Jorge Escalante	Mexico	59.2	Q

=== Final ===
The final was held on September 2.

Rank	Name	Nationality	Time	Notes
1st place, gold medalist(s)	Jeffrey Farrell	United States	56.3	GR
2nd place, silver medalist(s)	Elton Follett	United States	57.2	
3rd place, bronze medalist(s)	Bill Woolsey	United States	57.6	
4	Manuel dos Santos	Brazil	58.2	
5	Cameron Grout	Canada	-	
6	Thomas Verth	Canada	-	
7	Francisco Carioba	Brazil	59.6	
8	Jorge Escalante	Mexico	-	
