= Boris Nikitin =

Soviet swimmer (1938–1984)

Personal information
- Born: 5 March 1938 Tbilisi, USSR
- Died: 20 October 1984 (aged 46) Georgia SSR, USSR
- Height: 1.76 m (5 ft 9 in)
- Weight: 72 kg (159 lb)

Sport
- Sport: Swimming
- Club: Dynamo Tbilisi
Medal record
Representing Soviet Union
Summer Olympics
Bronze medal – third place	1956 Melbourne	4×200 m freestyle
European Championships
Gold medal – first place	1958 Budapest	4×200 m freestyle
Silver medal – second place	1958 Budapest	400 m freestyle

Boris Vasilievich Nikitin (Russian: Борис Васильевич Никитин; 5 March 1938 – 20 October 1984) was a Soviet freestyle swimmer. He had his best achievements in the 4 × 200 m relay, in which he set a world record in 1956, and won a bronze medal at the 1956 Summer Olympics and a gold medal at the 1958 European Aquatics Championships; his team finished eighths at the 1960 Olympics. Individually, he won a European silver medal in the 400 m freestyle in 1958, but did not reach the final in that event at the 1956 Olympics.

Between 1956 and 1962 he set five European records in the 4 × 200 m freestyle, 400 m freestyle and 400 m medley events. He won six national titles, in the 400 m (1956–1960) and 1500 m freestyle disciplines (1957).
