= Shrichand Bajaj =

Indian swimmer

Personal information
- Full name: Shrichand Bashamal Bajaj
- Nationality: Indian
- Born: 1 October 1933 Mumbai, India
- Died: 20 July 2005 (aged 71) Salem, Oregon, United States

Sport
- Sport: Swimming

Shrichand Bajaj (1 October 1933 – 20 July 2005) was an Indian swimmer. He competed in the men's 100 metre freestyle at the 1956 Summer Olympics.
