= Gennady Nikolayev =

Soviet swimmer (1936–2013)

Personal information
- Born: July 8, 1936
- Died: June 6, 2013 (aged 76)

Sport
- Sport: Swimming
Medal record
Representing the Soviet Union
Olympic Games
Bronze medal – third place	1956 Melbourne	4x200 m freestyle relay
European Championships
Gold medal – first place	1958 Budapest	4x200m freestyle relay

Gennady Nikolayev (8 July 1936 – 6 June 2013) was a Russian swimmer who competed in the 1956 Summer Olympics and in the 1960 Summer Olympics.
