= Hans-Joachim Reich =

German swimmer

Personal information
- Born: 18 April 1930
- Died: 16 January 2016 (aged 85)

Sport
- Sport: Swimming

Hans-Joachim Reich (18 April 1930 – 16 January 2016) was a German swimmer. He competed in two events at the 1956 Summer Olympics.
