= Ronald Eaton =

Australian cricketer

Personal information
- Full name: Harry Ronald Eaton
- Born: 28 January 1909; St Leonards, Australia
- Died: 13 May 1960 (aged 51); Castlecrag, Australia
- Source: ESPNcricinfo, 26 December 2016

Harry Ronald Eaton (28 January 1909 – 13 May 1960) was an Australian cricketer and rugby league footballer of the 1920s and 1930s.

== Cricket career ==
Eaton played one first-class match for New South Wales in 1928/29.

== Rugby league career ==
Ronald Eaton
Playing information
- Position: Second-row
Club
Years	Team	Pld	T	G	FG	P
1931–34	North Sydney	32	6	0	0	18
1935	Western Suburbs	12	2	0	0	6
	Total	44	8	0	0	24

Eaton played for North Sydney and Western Suburbs. After playing the 1931 season as an amateur, he became a professional in 1932.

== See also ==
- List of New South Wales representative cricketers
