= John Devitt =

Australian swimmer (1937–2023)

John Devitt AM
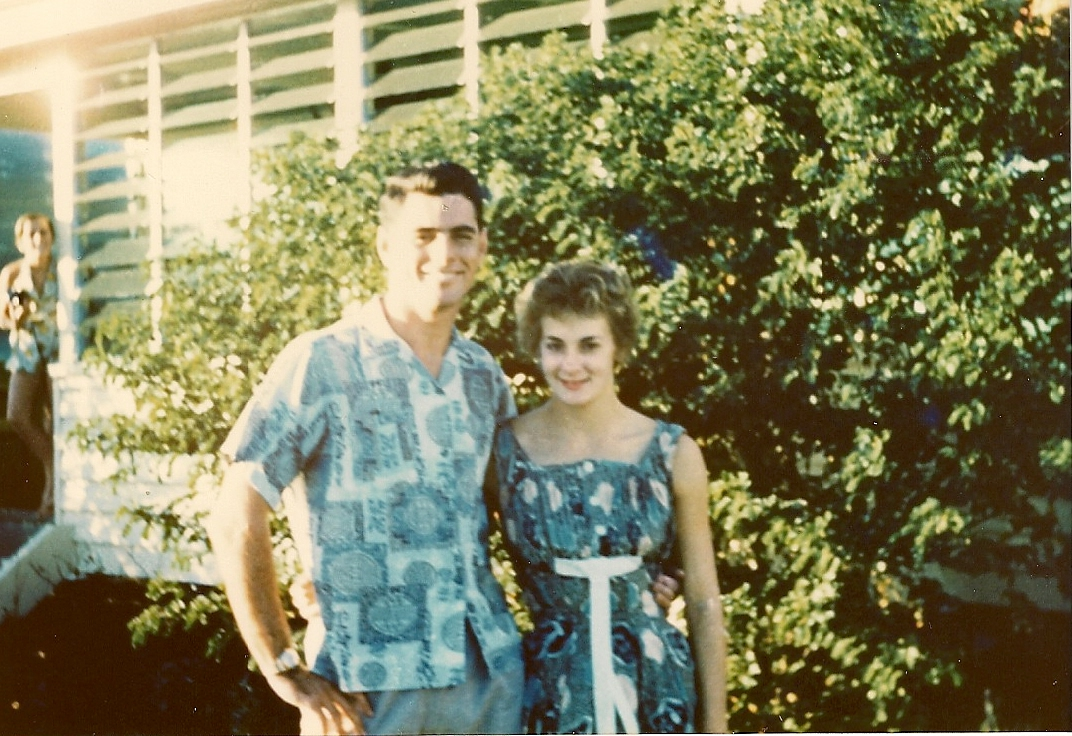
- John Devitt and Kaye Nottle in 1956

Personal information
- Full name: John Thomas Devitt
- National team: Australia
- Born: 4 February 1937 Granville, New South Wales, Australia
- Died: 17 August 2023 (aged 86) Sydney, New South Wales, Australia
- Height: 1.85 m (6 ft 1 in)
- Weight: 85 kg (187 lb)

Sport
- Sport: Swimming
- Strokes: Freestyle
- Club: Manly Swimming Club
Medal record
Men's swimming
Representing Australia
Olympic Games
Gold medal – first place	1956 Melbourne	4×200 m freestyle
Gold medal – first place	1960 Rome	100 m freestyle
Silver medal – second place	1956 Melbourne	100 m freestyle
Bronze medal – third place	1960 Rome	4×200 m freestyle
British Empire and Commonwealth Games
Gold medal – first place	1958 Cardiff	100 m freestyle
Gold medal – first place	1958 Cardiff	4×100 m medley relay
Gold medal – first place	1958 Cardiff	4×200 m freestyle relay

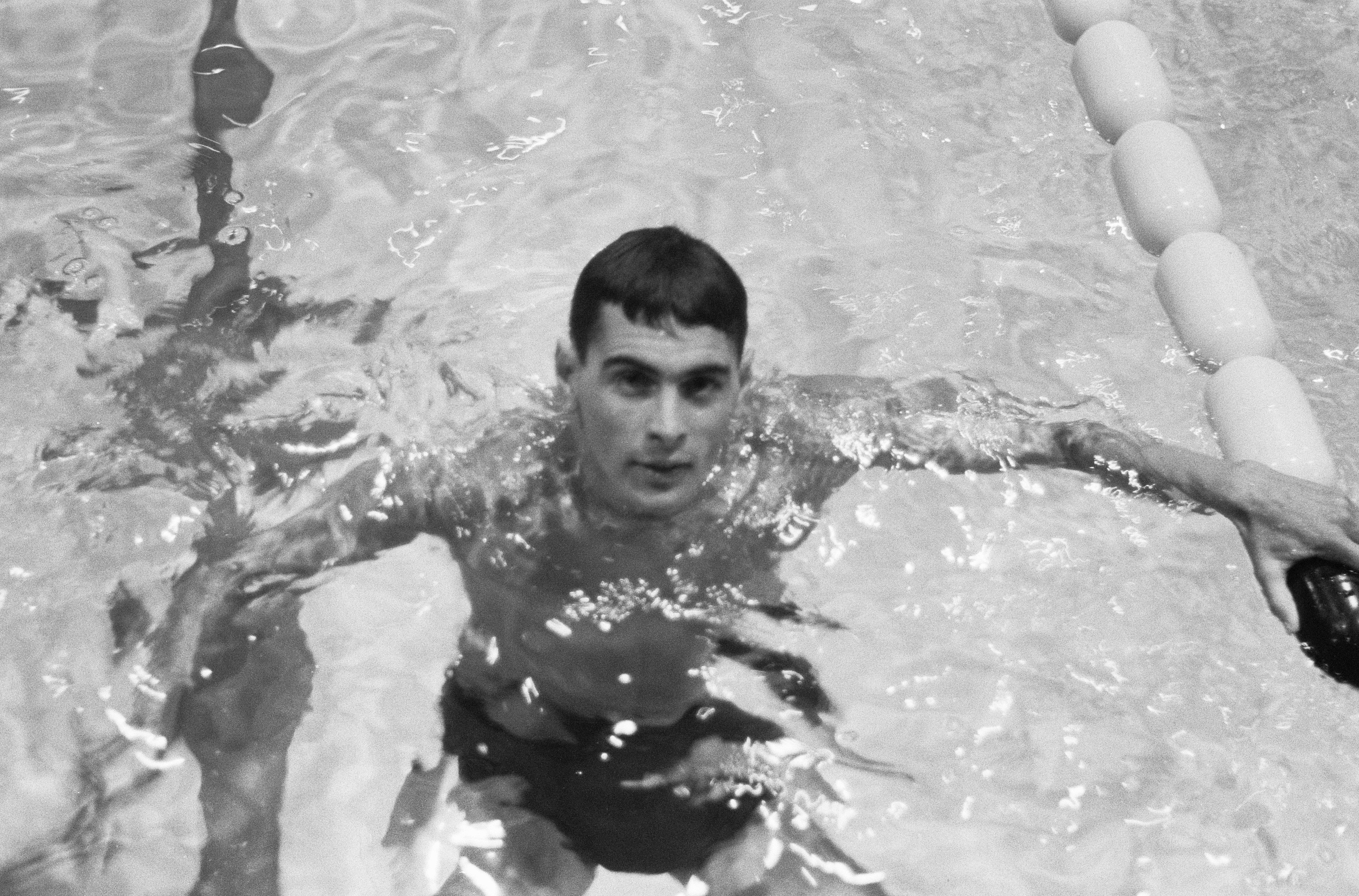
Devitt at the 1960 Olympics

John Thomas Devitt, AM (4 February 1937 – 17 August 2023) was an Australian sprint freestyle swimmer of the 1950s and 1960s, who won a gold medal in the 100-metre freestyle at the 1960 Summer Olympics in Rome. He won in controversial circumstances, being awarded the gold medal despite the timekeepers recording a slower time than the American silver medallist Lance Larson. He also claimed a gold medal at the 1956 Summer Olympics in Melbourne, in the 4×200-metre freestyle relay.

== Background ==
Growing up just 250 metres (820 ft) from the Granville Olympic Pool, Devitt learnt to swim as part of the government-funded Learn to Swim program. He was educated first at Holy Family Primary School, The Trongate, South Granville, and later at Parramatta Marist High School in Parramatta. Both were Roman Catholic schools, where he also swam competitively for the school team. Devitt was initially trained by Tom Penny at the Clyde Swim Club, based at the Granville Pool, until it disbanded in 1947 and he moved to Manly Swim Club along with Penny. Devitt remained a member of the Swim Club. Penny often allowed his swimmers to train in warm waters by having them swim against the current of discharged water from the White Bay power station. Barnacles and oysters flourished in this warm seawater environment. They grew everywhere, and especially on the rocks and on the piles that supported the wharves. For protection the swimmers wore shoes, even while they swam. Devitt said, "The only suitable shoes available in those days were sand shoes, which allowed us to tread safely on the bottom. The shoes filled up with water and became heavy, hence I developed the sort of '2-beat Australian kick' that stayed with me throughout my career."

== Swimming career ==
Devitt's first forays into national competition were at the 1952 Australian Championships, where he was continually in the shadow of club-mate Barry Darke, who set five Australian records in their age group. Devitt trailed Darke again at the 1953 championships, but Darke retired afterwards to become a mechanic, leaving Devitt to dominate his age group. However, in the open ranks, he was often beaten by Jon Henricks in the sprint events, and Gary Chapman and Murray Rose in the longer events. Rose and Henricks went on to claim individual gold at the 1956 Summer Olympics. At the age of 18, with Henricks initially sidelined by injury, Devitt was named as the captain of the New South Wales team for the 1955 Australian Championships. However, Henricks recovered and relegated Devitt to silver in the 110-yard freestyle. He also claimed silver in the 220-yard freestyle, behind Rose. Devitt's decision to concentrate on sprinting led to conflict with Penny, and he then left Penny and began self-coaching. After beginning to regress, Devitt considered retirement, until he joined Sam Herford at the Spit Baths alongside Murray Rose.

At the 1956 Australian Championships, Devitt finished third in the 110-yard behind Henricks and Chapman, and fifth in the 220-yard behind Chapman to gain Olympic selection. After a ten-week national training camp at the Tobruk Pool in Townsville, Queensland, Devitt was named as the national captain for the 1956 Summer Olympics in Melbourne. Devitt's first event was the 100-metre freestyle, where he won his heat and then his semi-final to qualify in second place for the final, where he matched Henricks for the first 80 metres, before Henricks surged to claim gold. Chapman completed an Australian sweep by finishing third. For the 4×200-metre freestyle relay, Devitt had clocked the fourth fastest time at the Australian Championships. After swimming the fastest leg in the heats of the relay, he was selected along with Rose, Henricks, and Kevin O'Halloran for the final. The Australians won the gold medal in a world record time, with Devitt clocking the fastest leg in the whole race.

In January 1957, Devitt set a world record in both the 100-metre and 110-yard freestyle, and lowered the 100-metre freestyle world record to 54.6 seconds later that month at the Queensland Championships. He then won his first individual Australian title in the 110-yard freestyle. With Henricks and Rose swimming and studying in the United States, Devitt became the dominant Australian freestyler, and decided to continue his career until the 1960 Summer Olympics, supporting himself as a health inspector for the Townsville City Council. In 1958, after claiming the Australian 110-yard title, he claimed three golds at the 1958 British Empire and Commonwealth Games in Cardiff, Wales in the 110-yard freestyle, and the 4×110-yard freestyle and medley relays. In 1959, Devitt again lowered the 110-yard freestyle, but was later defeated at the Australian Championships by John Konrads, who won every freestyle title from the 110-yard to 1650-yard events.

In 1960 Devitt reclaimed his 110-yard Australian title, and at the pre-1960 Summer Olympics camp in Townsville, broke the 4×100-yard freestyle relay record along with Henricks, Geoff Shipton, and David Dickson. At the 110-yard freestyle trial, he came third behind Henricks and Shipton, and was controversially selected as the second Australian representative, by selectors who ignored Shipton. He also finished fifth in the 220-yard freestyle and was initially left out of the 4×200-metre freestyle relay team. Devitt was again named the national captain.

On arrival in Rome, Henricks was forced to withdraw from competition after falling ill. Devitt held a solid lead until the last 10-metre when Larson surged and both appeared to have touched the wall together. Of the three judges who determined the first-place winner, two awarded Devitt as the winner. However, of the three judges assigned to allocate the second-place winner, two believed Devitt to have come second. Moreover, the three timekeepers assigned to the contest all believed Larson had won, noting times of 55.0, 55.1 and 55.1 seconds, while recording three times of 55.2 seconds for Devitt. Nevertheless, the chief judge overruled the timekeepers, setting Devitt and Larson's times to 55.2 seconds each and allocating the gold to Devitt. The United States team appealed, bolstered by videotaped footage of the finish that appeared to show Larson the winner. The appeal jury, headed by Jan de Vries, also the President of FINA in 1960, rejected the appeal, keeping Devitt the winner. This controversy would pave the way for electronic touchpads to be included in swimming events to determine finish and accurate timing.

== Post-swimming career ==
Upon returning to Australia, Devitt retired and began working for Speedo. He rose from a salesman to become the European manager, and later, manager of the International section. In 1979, he combined with Terry Gathercole to begin their own aquatic equipment firm. In the 1980s, he became an Olympic administrator, serving on the Australian Olympic Committee (AOC) executive. He was involved in Sydney's winning bid for the 2000 Summer Olympics and was the Australian team manager for the 2006 Commonwealth Games.

In 2017 Devitt and author Larry Writer travelled in France researching the story of Cecil Healy, an Australian soldier and fellow Olympic gold medallist who was killed in World War I. In 2018, the centenary of Healy's death, their book Cecil Healy: A Biography was launched by the AOC's John Coates and Governor of New South Wales, General David Hurley.

== Personal life and death ==
Devitt married his wife, Wendy Hogan, sister of Australian actor and comedian Paul Hogan, in 1961. He died in Sydney on 17 August 2023, at the age of 86.

== Honours ==
Devitt was inducted into the International Swimming Hall of Fame as an "Honor Swimmer" in 1979. and the Sport Australia Hall of Fame in 1986. He was made a Member of the Order of Australia in 1989, and received an Australian Sports Medal in 2000.

== Bibliography ==
- Andrews, Malcolm (2000). Australia at the Olympic Games. Sydney, New South Wales: ABC Books. pp. 129–131. ISBN 0-7333-0884-8.
- Howell, Max (1986). Aussie Gold. Albion, Queensland: Brooks Waterloo. pp. 142–146. ISBN 0-86440-680-0.

== See also ==
- List of members of the International Swimming Hall of Fame
- List of Commonwealth Games medallists in swimming (men)
- List of Olympic medalists in swimming (men)
- World record progression 100 metres freestyle
- World record progression 4 × 100 metres freestyle relay
- World record progression 4 × 200 metres freestyle relay
