= Vitaly Sorokin =

Russian swimmer (1935–1995)

Personal information
- Born: 8 December 1935 Leningrad, Russian SFSR
- Died: 1995 (aged 59)
- Height: 1.76 m (5 ft 9 in)
- Weight: 68 kg (150 lb)

Sport
- Sport: Swimming
- Club: Dynamo (1954–1956); Sport Club of the Army (1956–1961)
Medal record
Representing Soviet Union
Summer Olympics
| Bronze medal – third place | 1956 Melbourne | 4×200 m freestyle |

Vitaly Ivanovich Sorokin (Russian: Виталий Иванович Сорокин; 8 December 1935 – 1995) was a Russian swimmer, who competed at the 1956 and 1960 Summer Olympics. He won a bronze medal in 1956 and finished eighth in 1960 in the 4 × 200 m freestyle relay. In 1956 he set a world record in the 4 × 200 m freestyle relay. Between 1956 and 1959 he also set 6 European and 18 national records in freestyle relay events.

After retiring from competitions he worked as a swimming coach. Galina Prozumenshchikova was among his students.
