= Reid Patterson =

American swimmer (1932–2014)

Personal information
- Full name: Logan Reid Patterson
- National team: United States
- Born: July 2, 1932 Pineville, Kentucky
- Died: January 15, 2014 (aged 81) Knoxville, Tennessee
- Height: 6 ft 4 in (1.93 m)
- Weight: 170 lb (77 kg)

Sport
- Sport: Swimming
- Strokes: Freestyle
- College team: University of Georgia
Medal record
Representing Georgia
NCAA
Gold medal – first place	1953 Columbus	100 yard freestyle

Logan Reid Patterson (July 2, 1932 – January 15, 2014) was an American competition swimmer who represented the United States at the 1956 Summer Olympics.

Patterson was born in Pineville, Kentucky. He attended the University of Georgia, where he swam for the Georgia Bulldogs swimming and diving team in National Collegiate Athletic Association (NCAA) competition from 1951 to 1954. He was a member of the Sigma Chi fraternity. He won the NCAA national championship in the 100-yard freestyle in 1953, setting the American record during the meet. Patterson won eight Southeastern Conference (SEC) titles during his tenure at Georgia. He set six SEC records while in Athens: the 50-, 100-, and 220-yard freestyles, the 100- and 200-yard backstrokes, and the 150-yard individual medley.

Patterson finished fourth in the event final of the 100-meter freestyle at the 1956 Summer Olympics in Melbourne, Australia. He briefly held the Olympic record in the event after his first heat. He later held the world records in the 50-meter freestyle and the 200-meter freestyle relay. He held the American record in the 400-meter freestyle and the 400-meter medley relay.

He was inducted into the Georgia Sports Hall of Fame in 1984, and the University of Georgia Circle of Honor in 1997.

In 1955, Patterson saw a photo of Anna Lee Robinson and became determined to marry her. They were married for more than 56 years and had four daughters. After his swimming career, he went on to become a geologist and a financial advisor. At the age of 81, he died on January 15, 2014.

== See also ==
- List of University of Georgia people
