= Paul Voell =

German swimmer (1935–2004)

Personal information
- Born: 26 July 1935 Neuss, Germany
- Died: 27 February 2004 (aged 68) Düsseldorf, Germany

Sport
- Sport: Swimming

Paul Voell (26 July 1935 – 27 February 2004) was a German swimmer. He competed at the 1956 Summer Olympics and the 1960 Summer Olympics.
