= Hans Zierold =

German swimmer

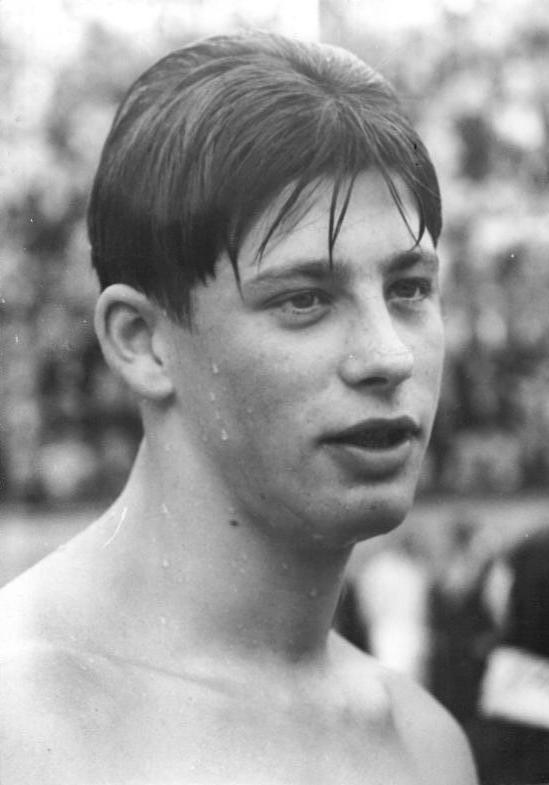
- Hans Zierold in 1956

Personal information
- Born: 16 April 1938 (age 88) Zeitz, Germany
- Height: 1.91 m (6 ft 3 in)
- Weight: 93 kg (205 lb)

Sport
- Sport: Swimming
- Club: Hamburger SC

Hans Zierold (born 16 April 1938) is a retired German swimmer. He competed at the 1956 and 1960 Summer Olympics in three events in total. In 1956 he finished fifth in the 400 m and 4×200 m freestyle events, whereas in 1960 he placed seventh in the 4×200 m relay. On 14 September 1957 he set a new European record in the 200 m butterfly.

In April 1958 he fled from East to West Germany.
