= Graham Hamilton (swimmer) =

Australian swimmer

Personal information
- Full name: Grahame Thomas Hamilton
- Nationality: Australian
- Born: 6 September 1939 Sydney, Australia
- Died: 25 June 1989 (aged 49)

Sport
- Sport: Swimming

Grahame Thomas Hamilton (6 September 1939 – 25 June 1989) was an Australian swimmer. He competed in the men's 4 × 200-metre freestyle relay at the 1956 Summer Olympics. His mother, Edna Davey was also an Olympic swimmer, competing in two events at the 1928 Summer Olympics.
