= Jon Henricks =

Australian Olympic swimmer (1935–2026)

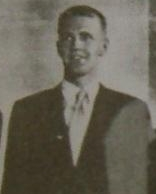

Personal information
- Full name: John Malcolm Henricks
- National team: Australia
- Born: 6 June 1935 Sydney, New South Wales, Australia
- Died: 21 November 2026 (aged 91)
- Height: 1.82 m (6 ft 0 in)
- Weight: 78 kg (172 lb)

Sport
- Sport: Swimming
- Strokes: Freestyle
- College team: University of Southern California
Medal record
Men's swimming
Representing Australia
Olympic Games
Gold medal – first place	1956 Melbourne	100 m freestyle
Gold medal – first place	1956 Melbourne	4×200 m freestyle
British Empire and Commonwealth Games
Gold medal – first place	1954 Vancouver	110 yd freestyle
Gold medal – first place	1954 Vancouver	4×220 yd freestyle
Gold medal – first place	1954 Vancouver	3×110 yd medley

John Malcolm Henricks OAM (6 June 1935 – 21 November 2026) was an Australian Olympic swimmer who won two gold medals at the 1956 Summer Olympics in Melbourne. Henricks set world records in two freestyle events.

== Career ==
Henricks began his competitive swimming career as a distance freestyle swimmer. He scored his first notable successes at the 1952 Australian national championships, when he came third in the 1500 metres, second in the 800 metres and first in the 400 metres. A prolonged ear infection kept him off the 1952 Australian Olympic team. His coach, Harry Gallagher, converted him to sprint freestyle events and he bettered the Olympic record for 100 metres at the 1953 Australian national championships. He held the 100 metres long-course world record for five years, winning gold medals in the 100 metres and 4×200-metre freestyle relay at the 1956 Summer Olympics in Melbourne. During these five years he lowered the pre-existing record by almost two seconds. During this time, he won ten Australian individual championships in these events and two British Empire Games medals. In 1954 he established new records at the Japanese Nationals, the Keo Nakama meet in Hawaii and the Philippine Nationals. The same year he also broke two US records during a visit. He was named Australian Athlete of the Year by the Helms Hall of Fame in 1955. In 1958 he won the American outdoor national championships in the 100 and 200 metres.

After the 1956 Olympics, Henricks enrolled at the University of Southern California (USC) where he was a member of the USC Trojans swimming team. As a freshman at USC he teamed with Murray Rose, Don Reddington, Tom Winters and Denis Devine, a five-man freshman team that broke the New Haven Swim Club's dynastic grasp on the Amateur Athletic Union (AAU) indoor championships. The USC freshman team grew into a collegiate powerhouse in the late 1950s and 1960s, dominating the Pacific-8 Conference, winning the National Collegiate Athletic Association (NCAA) team championship in 1960 and laying the groundwork for greater success.

In 1960, Henricks made another attempt at the Olympics, winning the Australian trials handily. He contracted a gastrointestinal ailment at the Olympics in Rome and was eliminated in Semi Final 2, finishing fourth. Australian John Devitt and American Lance Larson were left to contend. Both were teammates; Larson on his USC team, Devitt on his Australian team.

== Personal life and death ==
Henricks married an American woman, Bonnie Wilkie, the sister of his USC teammate Mike Wilkie, in 1960. The Australian and American Olympic swim teams attended the wedding, which produced a photograph of Olympic rivals Larson and Devitt hugging each other. Henricks attended Fort Street Boys' High School in Petersham, New South Wales.

Henricks died on 21 November 2026, aged 91, in the United States.

== Achievements ==
- 1952 Australian Championships: gold medal in 400m freestyle, silver in 800m freestyle, bronze in 1500m freestyle
- Australian Athlete of the Year in 1955
- 1956 Olympic Games: Gold medals in 100m freestyle and 4 × 200 m freestyle relay
- 1953-1958 Australian Championships: 10 gold medals in 100m freestyle and 4 × 200 m freestyle relay
- British Empire Games: 2 medals
- Japanese Nationals: 1 medal
- Keo Nakam meet: 1 medal
- Philippine Nationals: 1 medal
- American Nationals (outdoor): 100m and 200m freestyle medals in 1958
- American records: 2
- Inducted into the International Swimming Hall of Fame in 1973
- Inducted into the Sport Australia Hall of Fame in 1986
- Awarded Medal of the Order of Australia in 2018 for service to swimming at the elite level, and as a mentor.

== See also ==
- List of members of the International Swimming Hall of Fame
- List of Commonwealth Games medallists in swimming (men)
- List of Olympic medalists in swimming (men)
- World record progression 100 metres freestyle
- World record progression 4 × 200 metres freestyle relay
