= Atsushi Tani =

Japanese swimmer

Personal information
- Born: 14 November 1933 (age 92)

Sport
- Sport: Swimming

Atsushi Tani (谷 野, Tani Atsushi; born 14 November 1933) is a Japanese former swimmer. He competed in two events at the 1956 Summer Olympics.
