= Bill Woolsey =

American swimmer (1934–2022)

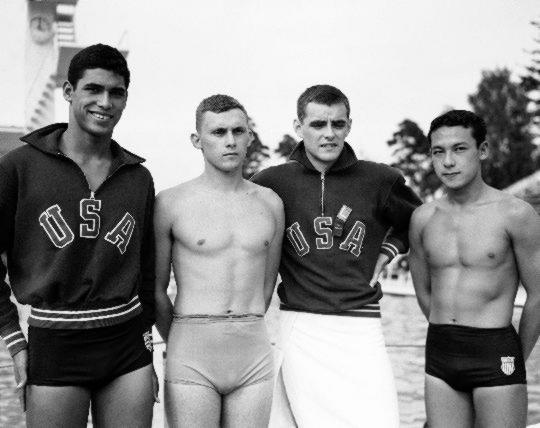
- 52 Olympic Gold 4x200m free relay team, Woolsey (far left), Wayne Moore, Jimmy McLane, Ford Konno

Personal information
- Full name: William Tripp Woolsey
- National team: United States
- Born: September 13, 1934 Honolulu, Territory of Hawaii, U.S.
- Died: June 25, 2022 (aged 87) California, U.S.
- Height: 6 ft 0 in (1.83 m)
- Weight: 185 lb (84 kg)

Sport
- Sport: Swimming
- Strokes: Freestyle
- Club: Hawaii Swim Club Intermediate (HSC)
- College team: Indiana University
- Coach: Tai Hi Lim; Bernard Koseki (McKinley High); Robert A. Royer; Doc Counsilman (Indiana)
Medal record
Men's swimming
Representing the United States
Olympic Games
Gold medal – first place	1952 Helsinki	4×200 m freestyle
Silver medal – second place	1956 Melbourne	4×200 m freestyle
Pan American Games
Bronze medal – third place	1959 Chicago	100 m freestyle
Representing Indiana
NCAA
Gold medal – first place	1956 Ann Arbor	220 yard freestyle
Gold medal – first place	1956 Ann Arbor	440 yard freestyle
Gold medal – first place	1957 Chapel Hill	220 yard freestyle
Gold medal – first place	1957 Chapel Hill	440 yard freestyle

William Tripp Woolsey (September 13, 1934 – June 25, 2022) was an American competition swimmer for McKinley High School and Indiana University, who captured an Olympic gold medal in Helsinki in 1952, and a silver medal in Melbourne in 1956.

Born on September 13, 1934, Woolsey was raised in Oahu's scenic Manoa Valley three miles East of downtown Honolulu, near the Pacific shoreline and after taking to the water by six, he was swimming competitively by nine. He and his family were of mixed native Hawaiian, Chinese and Caucasian descent.

In his youth he met Hall of Fame Coach Soichi Sakamoto, then a Boy Scout master on Maui, who also taught school. Sakamoto established the Three-year School dedicated to producing outstanding swimmers of Olympic caliber in three years. As a highly innovative coach, he was one of the earliest advocates of interval training in swimming. Though the method could be challenging and uncomfortable, in the school's early years Sakamoto's students trained in irrigation ditches, swimming against the current, a form of resistance training. Sakamoto would work as an Assistant Coach for the American Olympic team from 1952 through 1956, the years of Woolsey's Olympic participation, and would become Woolsey's primary swimming coach and mentor in his early years, though his High School coaches would also be highly instrumental in his development.

== High school swimming ==
Woolsey attended George Washington Intermediate (Middle) High and then McKinley High School in Honolulu where he swam with future Olympian Ford Konno. Swimming in the 7th and 8th grade boys division at the Invitational Intermediate School Boys' swimming meet at the McKinley High School pool in April 1950, as a slim 5' 11", 15-year old, Woolsey set a record of 2:31.5 in the 220 freestyle, breaking the old record by 4 seconds and set another record time of 25.8 in the 50 freestyle. He swam as a member of the HSC Club, the Hawaii Swim Club team for boys attending Honolulu's Washington Intermediate (Middle) School. The team, or many of its members were coached by Soichi Sakamoto.

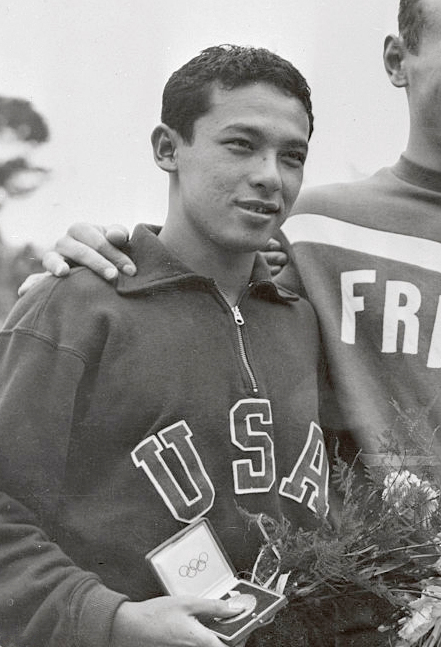
52 Olympian from McKinley high, F. Konno

In May 1952, as a McKinley High School Junior, competing under talented McKinley swim coach Tai Hi Lim, recipient of a Masters in Physical Education from Columbia University in 1951, Woolsey was selected for the 1951-52 Interscholastic All America swimming team for his nationally ranked performance in the 200-yard freestyle. His time that year of 2:11.4 in the 220-yard event was among the top 15 in the United States, and he had completed an equally impressive 59 second 100-yard freestyle swim. McKinley had a powerful high school swim team of over 20 swimmers that included future Olympic trial competitors.

Not confined to the Hawaiian Islands, Woolsey helped lead his McKinley High School team that year to championships at the M.I.T. relays, the Hawaii Territorial (State) Meet and the Yale Meet. In April, 1952, at the All Island meet at the University of Hawaii Pool, while being led by Head Coach Bernard Koseki, the McKinley High School boys swimming team dominated the meet and were named the Territorial Interscholastic Boys' Swimming Champions for the second consecutive year. A very strong Honolulu team, Punahou, took second place, but scored only 28 team points to the McKinley team's 74. Woolsey won the 200-yard freestyle, his signature event, in the Territorial Championship meet with a 2:01.5.

== Olympic competition ==
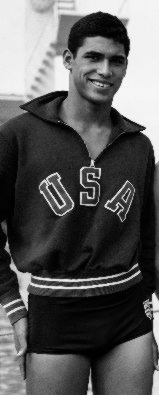
Woolsey, 52 Olympics

On July 6, 1952, as a sixteen-year-old at the Olympic Trials in New York, Woolsey qualified for the U.S. Olympic team by taking a third place in the finals of the 1,500-meter freestyle with a time of 19:08.4. In a year that saw impressive participation in the Olympics by American swimmers from the territory of Hawaii, Woolsey was notably the fifth Hawaiian to make the U.S. swim team. Other Hawaiian swimmers making the U.S. team that year included Ford Konno, Evelyn Kawamoto, Dick Cleveland, and Yoshi Oyakawa.

Travelling with the team that summer, he represented the United States at the Olympics in Helsinki, Finland, where he won a gold medal in the men's 4×200-meter freestyle relay with Yale's Wayne Moore, high school teammate Ford Konno, and Yale's Jimmy McLane. With Woolsey, the youngest member of the four man team swimming the second leg, the U.S. beat the second place Japanese relay team by two body lengths, and achieved an Olympic record time of 8:31.1.

At the 1956 Summer Olympics in Melbourne, Australia, Woosley won a silver medal in the 4×200-meter freestyle relay with University of Michigan swimmer Dick Hanley, George Breen, and Ford Konno, another talented native Hawaiian. Woolsey had won the 1956 Olympic Trials in New York in the 100-meter freestyle with a time of 57.0, but Olympic performances from a strong Australian team in their home country would be exceptional that year, and eclipse those of a talented American team. Competing in the finals of the 100-meter freestyle, Woolsey took a sixth place behind strong Australian competition that won the first three places in the event, though in a tight race he finished only .9 seconds from the bronze medal finisher, Australian Gary Chapman. In the 400-meter freestyle preliminaries, Woolsey placed tenth and did not make the finals, and though American George Breen managed to take the Bronze medal, the event was won by another exceptional Australian, Murray Rose.

== Indiana University ==
He attended Indiana University beginning in 1955, and swam for coach Robert A. Royer's Indiana Hoosiers swimming and diving team in National Collegiate Athletic Association (NCAA) competition. After 1956, future Hall of Fame Coach Doc Counsilman served as an Assistant Coach under Royer, and began to assume fuller coaching responsibilities during Royer's illness in 1957. While at Indiana, Woolsey was twice an NCAA champion, winning a total of four AAU titles and was a recipient of All-American honors on eight occasions. As an Indiana junior in 1956, he won Big Ten titles in the 220-, 440- and 1,650-yard freestyles and NCAA titles in the 220 and 440.

=== Post-college swimming and instructing ===
Woolsey won a bronze at the Chicago 1959 Pan American Games in the 100 m freestyle with a time of 57.6. His American teammates swept the event, taking both the gold and silver medals.

Maintaining his conditioning, in 1977, at age 32, Woolsey swam a third-place 5:24.70 for the 400-meter freestyle in a United States Masters meet in Hawaii.

During his time in Hawaii, he was hired as varsity swim coach for the Kamehameha Schools near Honolulu in July 1970.

Woolsey had several business ventures in later life including his family's Woolsey Poi company which had a farm in the Manoa Valley, where he grew up. He was a swim instructor for a period at Kaneohe District Park, East of Honolulu. He later moved to California where he taught swimming, continuing his work as an instructor. Late in life, he was inducted into the Hawai’i Sports Hall of Fame. An athlete like his grandfather, Woolsey's grandson Ikaika Woolsey, played for the University of Hawaii as a quarterback.

He became a strong advocate of teaching children to swim, particularly in his home state of Hawaii, and later California, and created a ten lesson swim program, known as the Ho’au learn-to-swim method. Woolsey had other businesses, but he continued to teach swimming into his 70s.

Woolsey died in California on June 25, 2022, at the age of 87.

== See also ==
- List of Indiana University (Bloomington) people
- List of Olympic medalists in swimming (men)
