= Horst Bleeker =

German swimmer

Personal information
- Nationality: West Germany
- Born: 17 June 1938 Bremen, Germany
- Died: 6 October 2023 (aged 85)

Sport
- Sport: Swimming
- Strokes: Freestyle, backstroke
- Club: Bremer Sport-Club

Horst Bleeker (born 17 June 1938 – 6 October 2023) was a former competition swimmer from Germany. He represented the United Team of Germany at the 1956 Summer Olympics in the 100-metre freestyle and 4×200-metre freestyle relay and finished in fifth place in the relay.

He won three national titles: in the 100-metre (1959), 200-metre (1957) and 400-metre freestyle (1957).

Bleeker died on 6 October 2023, at the age of 85.
