= Hilo High School =

Public school in Hilo, Hawaii

Coordinates: 19.72102°N 155.09608°W

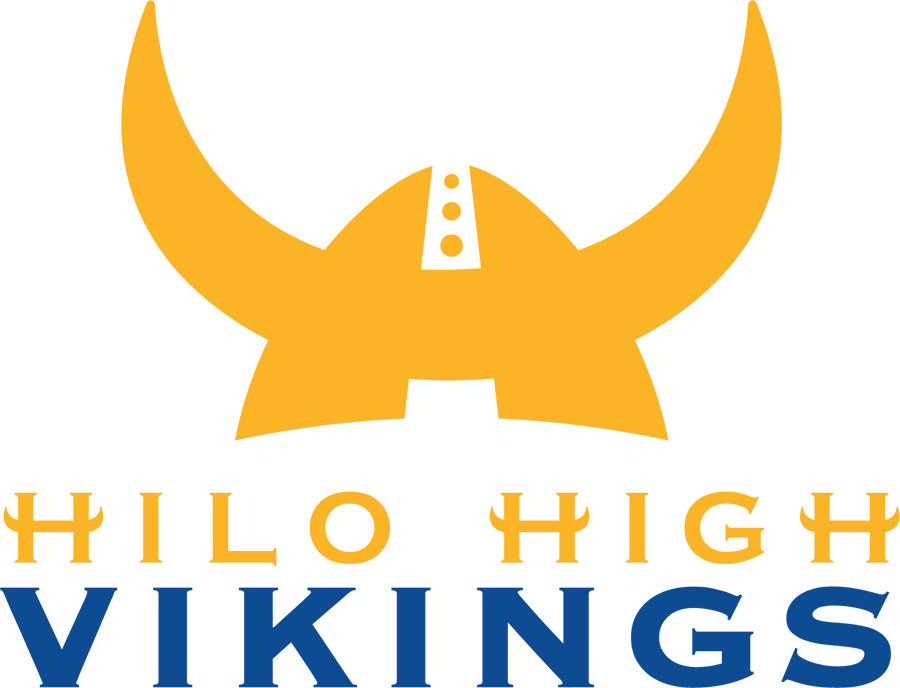

Location
- 556 Waianuenue Avenue; Hilo, Hawaii 96720; United States

Information
- Type: Public, co-educational
- Motto: "Once a Viking...Always a Viking"
- Established: 1906
- School district: Hawaii District
- Principal: Adrian De Mello
- Teaching staff: 74.00 (FTE)
- Grades: 9–12
- Enrollment: 1,170 (2024–2025)
- Student to teacher ratio: 15.81
- Campus: Suburban
- Colors: Blue and Gold
- Athletics: Big Island Interscholastic Federation
- Mascot: Viking
- Accreditation: Western Association of Schools and Colleges
- Newspaper: KVIKS News Bulletin
- Military: United States Army JROTC
- Website: www.hilohs.k12.hi.us

Hawaiʻi Register of Historic Places
- Designated: June 29, 2002
- Reference no.: 50-10-35-07522
- Part of: Public Schools on the Island of Hawaiʻi

Hilo High School is a public, co-educational high school operated by the Hawaii State Department of Education, and serves grades nine through twelve. Established in 1906, its first class graduated in 1909.

Hilo High School is near the Wailuku River in Hawaii County on the Big Island of Hawaii, United States. The campus boasts the black marble terrazzo and gray gravel sculpture Matrix by Ken Shutt.

The school is situated at 556 Waianuenue Avenue on across the street from Hilo Intermediate School, one of its two feeder schools, the other being Kalanianaole Intermediate School. Hilo's symbol and mascot is the Viking and its school colors are blue and gold. Hilo High School celebrated its centennial during the Homecoming presentation of 2006. Hilo High School's crosstown rivals are the Warriors of Waiakea High School.

== History ==
Hilo High School was started by the school authorities in September 1905. The idea for a high school is attributed to Josephine Deyo, principal of Hilo Union School. The weak public interest eventually grew stronger as the public realized the benefits from a high school in Hilo, Hawaii. At the time, the only High Schools on the island were Kau High and Pahala Elementary School and Honokaa High & Intermediate School, both over 30 miles away in rural sugar communities that were disconnected from most of the island and were only accessible by railroad. Most students who wished to attend high school went to boarding school in Honolulu, Hawaii.

The school changed location in 1907 to the District Annex location and was then named Hilo Junior High School. It was moved yet again in 1922 to its present location on Waianuenue Avenue.

=== Gym construction ===
In 2010, an environmental assessment was released regarding the construction of a new gym. The new gym would be provided as an alternative to the other gym located on-campus, which would be used for physical education classes. In 2012, funds were released by then-governor Neil Abercrombie to construct the facility, which began in the same year. The building was planned to be finished by September 2014, but was delayed due to issues with paving. The building was opened in December of that year, with a grand opening happening in April 2015. The building is designated as an emergency shelter and is LEED certified.

=== Track construction ===
In December 2023, construction started on the resurfacing of the track and field facility, which had been planned since 2017. The project, costing $11 million, consisted of replacing the previous track with an all new track and field made of artificial turf. On March 5, 2025, the facility was blessed with a traditional Hawaiian blessing.

== Academics ==
In 2024, the school was ranked #7,392 in National Rankings on the U.S. News & World Report.

=== Academies ===
As part of a restructuring process started in the 2022-2023 school year, Hilo High School has converted into a career academy system. 9th graders are placed into a cohort academy, with wall-to-wall career academies being implemented for 10-12th graders. The career academies offered are the Academy of Health & Human Services, Academy of Construction & Engineering, and the Academy of Business and Natural Resources.

=== Curriculum ===
To graduate, the school requires four credits in English and social studies, and three credits in science and mathematics. For electives, students are required to take 2 credits in either fine arts, World Language, or Career and Technical Education, one credit in physical education, half a credit in health, and for the Class of 2026 and beyond, half a credit in Transition to High School.

For dual-credit options, the school offers AP (Advanced Placement), Early College, and Running Start classes. As of the 2021-2022 School year, the school had a participation rate of 19% for AP classes, with 9% passing the AP exam. Running Start classes are offered at the University of Hawaii at Hilo and the Hawaii Community College, which are part of the University of Hawaii system.

With the introduction of AP classes to Hilo High, it is possible for more than one student to become a valedictorian within the same graduating class. In 2017, 24 seniors graduated as valedictorians. Per the Board of Education (BOE), students graduating with the Class of 2016 or later are required to have a weighted GPA (grade point average) of 4.0 and a distinguished BOE diploma in order to become a valedictorian.

== Extracurricular activities ==
Hilo High offers a total of 27 clubs. Notable clubs include Advancement via Individual Determination (AVID), Future Farmers of America (FFA), Junior Reserve Officers' Training Corps (JROTC), and a robotics club, which participates in the FIRST Robotics Competition. The digital-media program is run by KVIKS Media. The school offers a Performing Arts Learning Center, a learning center program that allows students to learn about theater arts and earn a semester credit. A student-run credit union is located on campus. The students are represented by the Hilo High School Student Association, which has an executive board and 11 students who represent a part of the student body. Each grade level is represented by an executive board and a representative from their advisory classes.

=== KVIKS Media ===
The school's digital media is run by KVIKS Media, a student-run nonprofit organization which started in 2017. The program's supporters include its own foundation and the Hilo High Foundation. The program's tasks include broadcasting of the morning bulletin, and the filming of school events. In 2023, the program broadcast a championship football game between Hilo and Konawaena, which earned them praise from Mufi Hannemann, the former mayor of Honolulu. In addition, a group of interns were sent to assist in the 60th annual Merrie Monarch Festival, where they assisted with social media, audio, and video editing. An alumni from the Class of 2023 was awarded with a scholarship from the Big Island Press Club.

=== Performing Arts Learning Center ===
As part of the Hawaii Department of Education's Learning Center program, Hilo High School offers a Performing Arts Learning Center (PALC). Established in 1987, PALC provides students in grades 7–12 with the opportunity to participate in theater arts and earn half a credit per semester. Courses include singing, acting, stage management, and stagecraft. Admission to the program requires an application. PALC has been recognized as a Center of Excellence by the HIDOE. The program stages four productions per school year, with a haunted house at Halloween, a Shakespeare performance in the second quarter, a student talent show in the third quarter, and a musical in the fourth quarter. Productions are located in the school's 300-seat auditorium.

== Endownment ==
In 1990, the Hilo High Foundation was created. According to the foundation's website, the endownment was created with the goal of providing the school with funding for school clubs and activities that would not be available through state funds. The foundation is overseen by a committee appointed by the school principal, which evaluates proposals from school staff for potential educational opportunities for funding.

The foundation has donated over $522,000 to the school. In a 2005 financial report, the foundation’s assets were valued at $724,063.44.

== Class mascot and colors ==
- Class of 2029: Sharks, Teal and White
- Class of 2028: Panthers, Blue and Gray
- Class of 2027: Cobras, Red and Silver
- Class of 2026: Tigers, Black and Gold
- Class of 2025: Jaguars, White and Gold
- Class of 2024: Phoenix, Black and Blue
- Class of 2023: Wolves, Black and Red
- Class of 2022: Dragons, Black and White
- Class of 2021: Panthers, White and Gold
- Class of 2020: Lions, Black and Gold
- Class of 2019: Wolves, Black and Silver
- Class of 2018: Honus, Teal and White
- Class of 2017: Dragons, Black and Red
- Class of 2016: Sharks, Black and White
- Class of 2015: Wolves, Blue and Gold
- Class of 2014: Pink Panthers, Black and Pink
- Class of 2013: Tigers, Black and Red
- Class of 2012: Dragons, Black and Silver
- Class of 2011: Phoenix, Black and Green
- Class of 2010: Panthers, Black and Gold
- Class of 2009: Sharks, Black and Red
- Class of 2008: Tigers, Black and Silver
- Class of 2007: Dragons, Blue and Silver
- Class of 2006: Panthers, Black and White
- Class of 2005: Honu, Black and Green
- Class of 2004: Tigers
- Class of 2003: Dragons, Black and Red
- Class of 2002: Monkeys, Blue and Silver
- Class of 2001: Elmo, Black and White
- Class of 2000: Honu, Black and Green
- Class of 1972: Super Chicken, Red, White and Blue
- Class of 1971: Pink Panthers, Pink and Purple

== Notable alumni ==
- James Kealoha (1926), first lieutenant governor of Hawaii
- Pat Saiki (1948), United States Congresswoman
- Yoshi Oyakawa (1951), Olympic swimming gold medalist in the 1952 Summer Olympics
- Gil Kahele (1960), American politician and Democratic member of the Hawaii Senate
- Robert Kiyosaki (1965), author of Rich Dad, Poor Dad
- Jennifer Doudna (1981), American biochemist, developer of the CRISPR-Cas9 genome editing method, 2020 Nobel laureate
- Lorraine Inouye, Hawaii County Mayor and State Senator
- Sonny Tanabe (1953), All America High School swimmer for Hilo High and Olympic swimmer in the 4x200 meter freestyle relay at the 1956 Summer Olympics
- Lois-Ann Yamanaka (1979), author
- Sean Saturnio (1985), American college football coach, 2024 AFCA Assistant Coach of the Year
- B.J. Penn (1995), retired MMA Fighter former UFC Lightweight and Welterweight Champion and UFC Hall of Fame Member
- Maui Ahuna (2020) Current baseball player for the San Francisco Giants

== Gallery ==
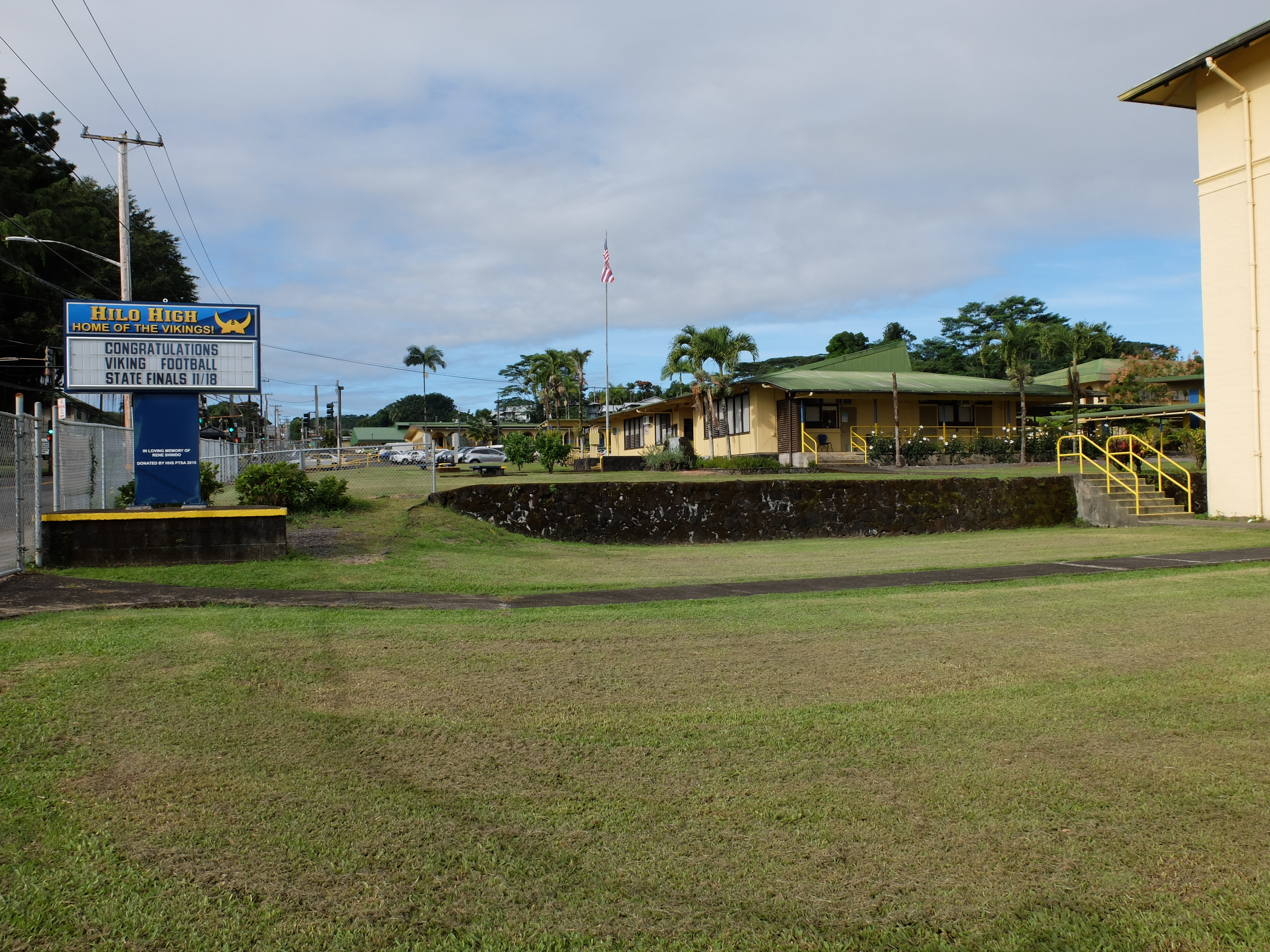
Main Office

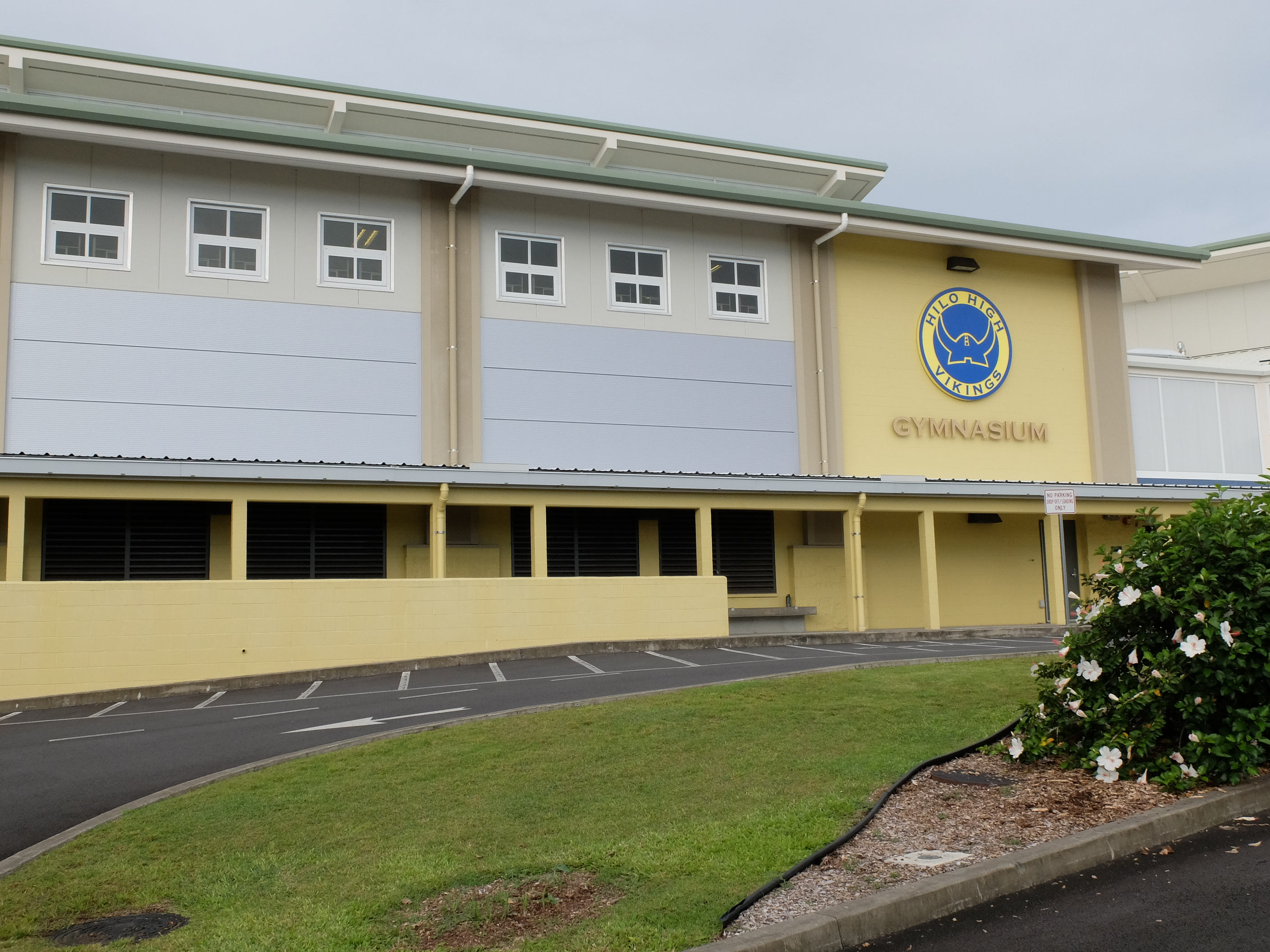
The School gym
