= 1941 NCAA swimming and diving championships =

American college aquatic sports competition

- Host city: East Lansing, Michigan
- Date(s): March 1941
- Venue(s): Jenison Pool; Michigan State College
- Teams: 16
- Events: 11

The 1941 NCAA swimming and diving championships were contested in March 1941 at Jenison Pool at Michigan State College in East Lansing, Michigan at the fifth annual NCAA-sanctioned swim meet to determine the team and individual national champions of men's collegiate swimming and diving among its member programs in the United States.

For the fifth consecutive year, Michigan topped the team standings, edging out Yale for the second straight year. It was the Wolverines' fifth title in program history and the fifth for coach Matt Mann.

== Team standings ==
- (H) = Hosts
- (DC) = Defending champions
- Italics = Debut appearance

Rank	Team	Points
1st place, gold medalist(s)	Michigan (DC)	61
2nd place, silver medalist(s)	Yale	58
3rd place, bronze medalist(s)	Ohio State	19
3rd place, bronze medalist(s)	Wayne (MI)	19
5	Minnesota	10
5	Princeton	10
7	Iowa	6
8	Occidental	5
9	Massachusetts State	3
9	Williams	3
11	Brown	2
11	Chicago	2
11	Springfield	2
11	Villanova	2
15	Dartmouth	1
15	Stanford	1

- DNQ = Michigan State (H)

== Individual events ==
=== Swimming ===
Event	Champion	Team	Time
50-yard freestyle	Charles Barker	Michigan	23.0
100-yard freestyle	Bill Prew	Wayne (MI)	52.1
220-yard freestyle	Howard Johnson (DC)	Yale	2:12.5
440-yard freestyle	James Welsh	Michigan	4:51.4
1,500-meter freestyle	Rene Chouteau	Yale	19:43.4
150-yard backstroke	Francis Heydt	Michigan	1:37.7
200-yard butterfly	John Skinner	Michigan	2:25.9
400-yard freestyle relay	Howard Johnson; Richard Kelly; Edward Pope; Thomas Britton	Yale	3:31.3
300-yard medley relay	Francis Heydt; John Skinner; Clair Morse	Michigan (DC)	2:58.0

=== Diving ===
Event	Champion	Team	Score
One-meter diving	Earl Clark	Ohio State	134.80
Three-meter diving	Earl Clark (DC)	Ohio State	165.40

== See also ==
- List of college swimming and diving teams
