= 1968 NCAA University Division swimming and diving championships =

American college aquatic sports competition

1968 NCAA University Division Swimming and Diving Championships
- Host city: Hanover, New Hampshire
- Date(s): March 1968
- Venue(s): Karl Michael Pool; Dartmouth College
- Teams: 37
- Events: 18

The 1968 NCAA University Division swimming and diving championships were contested at the 32nd annual swim meet sanctioned and hosted by the NCAA to determine the individual and team national champions of men's collegiate swimming and diving among its University Division member programs in the United States, culminating the 1967–68 NCAA University Division swimming and diving season.

These championships were hosted by Dartmouth College at the Karl Michael Pool on its campus in Hanover, New Hampshire.

Indiana topped the team championship standings, the Hoosiers' first national title.

== Team standings ==
- (H) = Hosts
- (DC) = Defending champions
- Italics = Debut appearance

Rank	Team	Points
1st place, gold medalist(s)	Indiana	346
2nd place, silver medalist(s)	Yale	253
3rd place, bronze medalist(s)	USC	231
4	Stanford (DC)	205
5	SMU	93
6	Michigan	92
7	Texas−Arlington	89
8	UCLA	74
9	Colorado State	60
10	Wisconsin	55
11	Dartmouth (H)	40
11	Long Beach State	40
13	Michigan State	38
14	Princeton	34
15	Southern Illinois	31
16	Arizona State	28
17	Illinois	27
18	Florida	26
19	NC State	24
19	Ohio State	24
20	Ohio	15
21	Villanova	13
22	BYU	12
24	Iowa State	11
24	Wesleyan (CT)	11
26	Miami (OH)	10
26	Purdue	10
28	North Carolina	9
29	Minnesota	8
30	California	5
31	UC Santa Barbara	4
31	Maryland	4
31	Texas	4
34	Army	3
34	Cornell (NY)	3
36	Oklahoma	2
37	Colgate	1

== Individual events ==
=== Swimming ===
Event	Champion	Team	Time
50 yard freestyle	Zac Zorn (DC)	UCLA	20.99
100 yard freestyle	Zac Zorn	UCLA	45.45
200 yard freestyle	Don Schollander	Yale	1:42.04
500 yard freestyle	Greg Charlton	USC	4:38.24
1,650 yard freestyle	Mike Burton (DC)	UCLA	15:59.34
100 yard backstroke	Charlie Hickcox (DC)	Indiana	52.18
200 yard backstroke	Charlie Hickcox (DC)	Indiana	1:54.66
100 yard breaststroke	Dick Nesbit	Texas–Arlington	59.11
200 yard breaststroke	Phil Long	Yale	2:11.72
100 yard butterfly	Doug Russell	Texas–Arlington	49.57
200 yard butterfly	Phil Houser	USC	1:52.55
200 yard individual medley	Charlie Hickcox	Indiana	1:52.56
400 yard individual medley	Bill Utley	Indiana	4:10.85
400 yard freestyle relay	Steve Job; John Nelson; Bob Waples; Don Schollander	Yale	3:04.09
800 yard freestyle relay	Dick Schneider; John Nelson; Dave Johnson; Don Schollander	Yale	6:50.77
400 yard medley relay	Doug Russell; Dick Nesbit; Chuck Smith; Ernie Siefert	Texas–Arlington	3:31.53

=== Diving ===
Event	Champion	Team	Score
1 meter diving	Jim Henry	Indiana	512.05
3 meter diving	Keith Russell	Arizona State	494.55

== See also ==
- 1968 NCAA College Division swimming and diving championships
- 1968 NAIA swimming and diving championships
- List of college swimming and diving teams
