= 1963 NCAA swimming and diving championships =

American college aquatic sports competition

- Host city: Raleigh, North Carolina
- Date(s): March 1963
- Venue(s): Willis Casey Natatorium; North Carolina State University
- Teams: 22
- Events: 17

The 1963 NCAA swimming and diving championships were contested at the 27th annual swim meet sanctioned and hosted by the NCAA to determine the individual and team national champions of men's collegiate swimming and diving among its Division I member programs in the United States, culminating the 1962–63 NCAA swimming and diving season.

These championships were hosted by North Carolina State University at the Willis Casey Natatorium in Raleigh, North Carolina during March 1963.

USC finished four points ahead of Yale in the team championship standings and won the national title, the Trojans' second overall and second in three years.

This was the final combined competition before the establishment of separate championships for the NCAA's University and College Divisions in 1964.

== Program changes ==
- Three events were removed from the event program:
  - 220-yard freestyle
  - 440-yard freestyle
  - 1,500-meter freestyle
- Four new events were added to the program:
  - 200-yard freestyle
  - 500-yard freestyle
  - 1,650-yard freestyle
  - 400-yard individual medley

== Team standings ==
- (H) = Hosts
- (DC) = Defending champions
- Italics = Debut appearance

Rank	Team	Points
1st place, gold medalist(s)	USC	81
2nd place, silver medalist(s)	Yale	77
3rd place, bronze medalist(s)	Michigan	52
4	Minnesota	44
5	Ohio State (DC)	36
6	Stanford	21
7	Villanova	19.5
8	Michigan State	15
8	Princeton	15
10	Harvard	12
11	NC State (H)	7
12	Texas	6
13	Illinois	5
13	Oregon	5
13	SMU	5
16	California	3
16	Florida	3
16	Rutgers	3
19	Army	2
19	Cincinnati	2
21	Oklahoma	1.5
22	Utah	1

== Individual events ==
=== Swimming ===
Event	Champion	Team	Time
50 yard freestyle	Steven Jackman (DC)	Minnesota	21.2
100 yard freestyle	(Sweden) Per-Ola Lindberg	USC	47.1
200 yard freestyle	Steve Clark	Yale	1:46.3
500 yard freestyle	(Australia) John Konrads	USC	4:50.7
1,650 yard freestyle	(Australia) John Konrads	USC	17:24.0
100 yard backstroke	Bob Bennett	USC	53.8
200 yard backstroke	Ed Bartsch	Michigan	1:57.8
100 yard breaststroke	Ron Clark (DC); Gardiner Green	Michigan; Princeton	1:02.2
200 yard breaststroke	Martin Hull	Stanford	2:17.0
100 yard butterfly	Walt Richardson	Minnesota	51.6
200 yard butterfly	Dick McDonough	Villanova	1:57.3
200 yard individual medley	Harley Mull (DC)	Ohio State	2:01.6
400 yard individual medley	Ed Townsend	Yale	4:22.5
400 yard freestyle relay	Charles Mussman; David Lyons; Ed Townsend; Mike Austin	Yale	3:09.7
400 yard medley relay	Al Ericksen; Virgil Luken; Walt Richardson; Steven Jackman	Minnesota	3:35.2

=== Diving ===
Event	Champion	Team	Score
1 meter diving	Lou Vitucci (DC)	Ohio State	489.70
3 meter diving	Lou Vitucci (DC)	Ohio State	496.90

== See also ==
- 1963 NAIA swimming and diving championships
- List of college swimming and diving teams
