= 1969 NCAA University Division swimming and diving championships =

American college aquatic sports competition

- Host city: Bloomington, Indiana
- Date: March 1969
- Venue(s): Royer Pool; Indiana University
- Teams: 34
- Events: 18

The 1969 NCAA University Division swimming and diving championships were contested at the 33rd annual swim meet sanctioned and hosted by the NCAA to determine the individual and team national champions of men's collegiate swimming and diving among its University Division member programs in the United States, culminating the 1968–69 NCAA University Division swimming and diving season.

These championships were hosted by Indiana University at the Royer Pool on its campus in Bloomington, Indiana.

Hosts and defending champions Indiana again topped the team championship standings, the Hoosiers' second NCAA national title.

== Team standings ==
- (H) = Hosts
- (DC) = Defending champions
- Italics = Debut appearance

Rank	Team	Points
1st place, gold medalist(s)	Indiana (H)	427
2nd place, silver medalist(s)	USC	306
3rd place, bronze medalist(s)	Stanford	196
4	Michigan	164
5	Yale	160
6	UCLA	120
7	Long Beach State	82
8	Ohio State	61
9	Florida	45
9	Oregon	45
11	Princeton	42
12	Michigan State	38
13	Colorado State	33
14	Southern Illinois	25
15	Minnesota	21
16	Purdue	20
16	SMU	20
18	Ohio	19
18	Wisconsin	19
20	NC State	16
20	Washington	16
22	Wesleyan (CT)	14
23	Florida State	11
24	Dartmouth	10
25	Air Force	6
25	Utah	6
27	Arizona State	5
27	Illinois	5
27	San Diego State	5
30	BYU	4
30	Kansas	4
32	Army	2
32	Tennessee	2
34	Kent State	1

== Individual events ==
=== Swimming ===
Event	Champion	Team	Time
50 yard freestyle	Dan Frawley	USC	21.04
100 yard freestyle	Frey Heath	UCLA	46.24
200 yard freestyle	Mark Spitz	Indiana	1:39.53
500 yard freestyle	Mark Spitz	Indiana	4:33.48
1,650 yard freestyle	(West Germany) Hans Fassnacht	Long Beach State	15:54.21
100 yard backstroke	Fred Haywood	Stanford	52.44
200 yard backstroke	Charlie Hickcox (DC)	Indiana	1:53.67
100 yard breaststroke	Dick Nesbit	Texas–Arlington	59.11
200 yard breaststroke	Phil Long	Yale	2:11.72
100 yard butterfly	Mark Spitz	Indiana	49.69
200 yard butterfly	John Ferris	Stanford	1:49.61
200 yard individual medley	Charlie Hickcox (DC)	Indiana	1:54.43
400 yard individual medley	(West Germany) Hans Fassnacht	Long Beach State	4:07.66
400 yard freestyle relay	Dan Frawley; Russ Kidder; Frank Heckl; Don Havens	USC	3:02.77
800 yard freestyle relay	George WatsonGeorge Watson; Mark Mader; Greg Charlton; Frank Heckl	USC	6:49.48
400 yard medley relay	Charlie Hickcox; Jim Counsilman; Steve Borowski; Bryan Bateman	Indiana	3:25.89

=== Diving ===
Event	Champion	Team	Score
1 meter diving	Jim Henry (DC)	Indiana	531.06
3 meter diving	Jim Henry	Indiana	574.68

== See also ==
- 1969 NCAA College Division swimming and diving championships
- 1969 NAIA swimming and diving championships
- List of college swimming and diving teams
