= 1937 NCAA swimming and diving championships =

American college aquatic sports competition

1937 NCAA Swimming and Diving Championships
- Host city: Minneapolis, Minnesota
- Venue(s): University of Minnesota Armory; University of Minnesota
- Teams: 11
- Events: 11

The 1937 NCAA swimming and diving championships were contested at the University of Minnesota Armory at the University of Minnesota in Minneapolis, Minnesota as part of the 14th annual NCAA swim meet to determine the team and individual national champions of men's collegiate swimming and diving in the United States.

Even though NCAA swimming championships had been held since 1924, this was the first event with an official team championship.

Michigan won the inaugural official team national championship, defeating rival Ohio State by 36 points, 75–39. It was the first official NCAA title for the Wolverines but their eighth including the unofficial titles won between 1924 and 1936.

== Team results ==
Rank	Team	Points
1st place, gold medalist(s)	Michigan	75
2nd place, silver medalist(s)	Ohio State	39
3rd place, bronze medalist(s)	Yale	38
4	Northwestern	13
5	Iowa	11
6	Chicago	7
7	Penn	6
8	Stanford	5
9	Minnesota	4
9	Princeton	4
11	Dartmouth	1

== Individual events ==
=== Swimming ===
Event	Champion	Team	Time
50-yard freestyle	Ed Kirar	Michigan	23.2
100-yard freestyle	Ed Kirar	Michigan	52.3
220-yard freestyle	Tom Haynie	Michigan	2:11.5
440-yard freestyle	Tom Haynie	Michigan	4:51.7
1,500-meter freestyle	John Macionis	Yale	19:58.5
150-yard backstroke	William Neunzig	Ohio State	1:37.1
200-yard butterfly	Jack Kasley	Michigan	2:26.6
400-yard freestyle relay	Waldemar Tomski; Tom Haynie; Ed Kirar; Robert Mowerson	Michigan	3:32.2
300-yard medley relay	Frederick Cody; Jack Kasley; Robert Mowerson	Michigan	2:57.8

=== Diving ===
Event	Champion	Team	Score
One-meter diving	Jim Patterson	Ohio State	135.80
Three-meter diving	Ben Grady	Michigan	136.46

== See also ==
- List of college swimming and diving teams
