= 1942 NCAA swimming and diving championships =

American college aquatic sports competition

- Host city: Cambridge, Massachusetts
- Date(s): March 27, 1942
- Venue(s): Indoor Athletic Building; Harvard University
- Teams: 16
- Events: 11

The 1942 NCAA swimming and diving championships were contested March 27, 1942 at the Indoor Athletic Building at Harvard University in Cambridge, Massachusetts at the sixth annual NCAA-sanctioned swim meet to determine the team and individual national champions of men's collegiate swimming and diving among its member programs in the United States.

Yale topped the team standings, claiming the Bulldogs' first title in program history. Yale topped five-time defending champions Michigan by 32 points to take the team championship.

== Team standings ==
- (H) = Hosts
- (DC) = Defending champions
- Italics = Debut appearance

Rank	Team	Points
1st place, gold medalist(s)	Yale	71
2nd place, silver medalist(s)	Michigan (DC)	39
3rd place, bronze medalist(s)	Ohio State	34
4	Princeton	9
5	Rutgers	8
6	Dartmouth	7
6	Northwestern	7
7	Massachusetts State	6
8	Occidental	5
9	Harvard (H)	4
9	Iowa	4
11	Minnesota	2
11	North Carolina	2
11	Williams	2
14	Amherst	1
14	Penn	1
14	Wayne (MI)	1

== Individual events ==
=== Swimming ===
Event	Champion	Team	Time
50-yard freestyle	Bob Amundsen	Northwestern	23.4
100-yard freestyle	Howard Johnson	Yale	52.4
220-yard freestyle	Howard Johnson (DC)	Yale	2:12.5
440-yard freestyle	Rene Chouteau	Yale	4:46.4
1,500-meter freestyle	Rene Chouteau (DC)	Yale	19:23.9
150-yard backstroke	Daniel Dannenbaum	Yale	1:36.3
200-yard butterfly	John Skinner (DC)	Michigan	2:23.7
400-yard freestyle relay	William Burton; Louis Divi; John Patten; John Sharemet	Michigan	3:27.8
300-yard medley relay	Daniel Dannenbaum; Edwin Davidge; Edward Pope	Yale	2:54.8

=== Diving ===
Event	Champion	Team	Score
One-meter diving	Frank Dempsey	Ohio State	134.80
Three-meter diving	Frank Dempsey	Ohio State	151.20

== See also ==
- List of college swimming and diving teams
