= 1967 NCAA University Division swimming and diving championships =

American college aquatic sports competition

1967 NCAA University Division Swimming and Diving Championships
- Host city: East Lansing, Michigan
- Date(s): March 1967
- Venue(s): McCaffree Pool; Michigan State University
- Teams: 35
- Events: 18

The 1967 NCAA University Division swimming and diving championships were contested at the 31st annual swim meet sanctioned and hosted by the NCAA to determine the individual and team national champions of men's collegiate swimming and diving among its University Division member programs in the United States, culminating the 1966–67 NCAA University Division swimming and diving season.

These championships were hosted by Michigan State University at the McCaffree Pool on its campus in East Lansing, Michigan.

Stanford topped the team standings for the first time, finishing fifteen points ahead of four-time defending champions USC. This was the Indians' first NCAA national title.

== Team standings ==
- (H) = Hosts
- (DC) = Defending champions
- Italics = Debut appearance

| Rank | Team | Points |
|---|---|---|
| 1st place, gold medalist(s) | Stanford | 275 |
| 2nd place, silver medalist(s) | USC (DC) | 260 |
| 3rd place, bronze medalist(s) | Indiana | 249 |
| 4 | Michigan | 184 |
| 5 | UCLA | 148 |
| 6 | Yale | 135 |
| 7 | SMU | 127 |
| 8 | Michigan State (H) | 115 |
| 9 | North Carolina | 55 |
| 10 | Minnesota | 42 |
| 11 | NC State | 38 |
| 12 | Ohio State | 36 |
| 13 | Princeton | 33 |
| 14 | Utah | 32 |
| 15 | Wisconsin | 30 |
| 16 | Colorado State | 25 |
| 17 | Villanova | 23 |
| 18 | Southern Illinois | 20 |
| 19 | Oregon | 18 |
| 20 | Texas | 13 |
| 21 | Florida | 12 |
| 21 | Illinois | 12 |
| 23 | Miami (OH) | 10 |
| 24 | Army | 9 |
| 25 | Washington | 6 |
| 26 | Air Force | 4 |
| 27 | Duke | 3 |
| 27 | Maryland | 3 |
| 27 | Northwestern | 3 |
| 27 | Wyoming | 3 |
| 31 | UC Santa Barbara | 2 |
| 31 | Dartmouth | 2 |
| 31 | Georgia | 2 |
| 31 | Navy | 2 |
| 35 | Purdue | 1 |

== Individual events ==
=== Swimming ===
| Event | Champion | Team | Time |
|---|---|---|---|
| 50 yard freestyle | Zac Zorn | UCLA | 21.12 |
| 100 yard freestyle | Ken Walsh | Michigan State | 45.67 |
| 200 yard freestyle | Greg Buckingham | Stanford | 1:41.46 |
| 500 yard freestyle | Greg Buckingham | Stanford | 4:37.16 |
| 1,650 yard freestyle | Mike Burton | UCLA | 16:17.59 |
| 100 yard backstroke | Charlie Hickcox | Indiana | 53.17 |
| 200 yard backstroke | Charlie Hickcox | Indiana | 1:55.30 |
| 100 yard breaststroke | Ken Merten | SMU | 58.54 |
| 200 yard breaststroke | Ken Merten | SMU | 2:07.99 |
| 100 yard butterfly | Ross Wales | Princeton | 50.26 |
| 200 yard butterfly | Carl Robie (DC) | Michigan | 1:52.59 |
| 200 yard individual medley | Dick Roth | Stanford | 1:56.09 |
| 400 yard individual medley | Dick Roth | Stanford | 4:12.11 |
| 400 yard freestyle relay | (Argentina) Luis Nicolao; Bill Meyer; Morgan Manning; James Laney | Stanford | 3:05.00 |
| 800 yard freestyle relay | Dick Roth; Mark Parmely; Mike Wall; Greg Buckingham | Stanford | 6:54.65 |
| 400 yard medley relay | Mike Berger; Russell Webb; Stanley Cole; Zac Zorn | UCLA | 3:29.45 |

=== Diving ===
| Event | Champion | Team | Score |
|---|---|---|---|
| 1 meter diving | Ken Sitzberger (DC) | Indiana | 510.25 |
| 3 meter diving | Ken Sitzberger | Indiana | 572.40 |

== See also ==
- 1967 NCAA College Division swimming and diving championships
- 1967 NAIA swimming and diving championships
- List of college swimming and diving teams
