= 1924–25 NCAA season =

1924–25 NCAA championships
Tournament information
- Dates: August 1924–June 1925

Tournament statistics
- Sports: 2
- Championships: 2

The 1924–25 NCAA championships were contested by the NCAA during the 1924–25 collegiate academic school year, its fifth year of hosting championships, to determine the team and individual national champions of two sponsored sports.

Before the introduction of the separate University Division and College Division before the 1955–56 school year, the NCAA only conduced a single national championship for each sport. Women's sports were not added until 1981–82.

== Championships ==
Sport/Event	Championship	Edition	Finals Site Host(s)	Date(s)	Team Champion(s)
Swimming and Diving	1925 NCAA Swimming and Diving Championships	2nd	Patten Gymnasium; Evanston, Illinois; Northwestern University	March 1925	Navy (Unofficial)
Track and Field	1925 NCAA Track and Field Championships	4th	Stagg Field; Chicago, Illinois; University of Chicago	June 1925	Stanford (1st)

== Season results ==
=== Team titles, by university ===
Rank	University	Titles
1	Stanford	1

== Cumulative results ==
=== Team titles, by university ===
Rank	University	Titles
1	California; Illinois; Michigan; Stanford	1
