= 1939 NCAA swimming and diving championships =

American college aquatic sports competition

1939 NCAA Swimming and Diving Championships
- Host city: (Michigan) Ann Arbor, MI
- Date(s): March 24, 1939
- Venue(s): Intramural Sports Building; University of Michigan
- Teams: 15
- Events: 11

The 1939 NCAA swimming and diving championships were contested March 24, 1938 at the third annual NCAA-sanctioned swim meet to determine the team and individual national champions of men's collegiate swimming and diving among its member programs in the United States.

This year's event was hosted at the Intramural Sports Building at the University of Michigan in Ann Arbor.

For the third consecutive year, Michigan topped rivals Ohio State in the team standings, earning the host Wolverines their third national title. Michigan were coached by Matt Mann.

== Team results ==
- (H) = Hosts
- (DC) = Defending champions
- Italics = Debut appearance

Rank	Team	Points
1st place, gold medalist(s)	Michigan (H, DC)	65
2nd place, silver medalist(s)	Ohio State	58
3rd place, bronze medalist(s)	Princeton	22
4	Yale	14
5	Harvard	8
5	USC	8
5	Texas	8
8	Northwestern	4
9	Columbia	3
9	Iowa	3
9	Iowa Agricultural	3
12	Florida	2
12	Franklin & Marshall	2
12	Illinois	2
12	Kenyon	2

== Individual events ==
=== Swimming ===
Event	Champion	Team	Time
50-yard freestyle	Charles Barker	Michigan	23.5
100-yard freestyle	Charles Barker; Paul Wolf	Michigan; USC	52.9
220-yard freestyle	Tom Haynie	Michigan	2:11.7
440-yard freestyle	Tom Haynie	Michigan	4:49.7
1,500-meter freestyle	Harold Stanhope	Ohio State	19:53.8
150-yard backstroke	Al Vande Weghe (DC)	Princeton	1:35.1
200-yard butterfly	Richard R. Hough (DC)	Princeton	2:22.0
400-yard freestyle relay	Charles Barker; Edward Hutchens; Tom Haynie; Waldemar Tomski	Michigan (DC)	3:33.5
300-yard medley relay	Al Vande Weghe; Richard R. Hough; Hendrik Van Oss	Princeton (DC)	2:54.5

=== Diving ===
Event	Champion	Team	Score
One-meter diving	Al Patnik (DC)	Ohio State	131.08
Three-meter diving	Al Patnik (DC)	Ohio State	161.34

== See also ==
- List of college swimming and diving teams
