= 1926–27 NCAA season =

1926-27 NCAA season focused on college football, and basketball arrived

1926–27 NCAA championships
Tournament information
- Dates: August 1926–June 1927

Tournament statistics
- Sports: 2
- Championships: 2

The 1926–27 NCAA championships were contested by the NCAA during the 1926–27 collegiate academic school year, the NCAA's sixth season of championships, to determine the team and individual national champions of its two sponsored sports.

Before the introduction of the separate University Division and College Division before the 1955–56 school year, a single national championship was conducted for each sport. Women's sports were not added until 1981–82.

== Championships ==
| Sport/Event | Championship | Edition | Finals Site Host(s) | Date(s) | Team Champion(s) |
|---|---|---|---|---|---|
| Swimming and Diving | 1927 NCAA Swimming and Diving Championships | 4th | Scott Natatorium; Iowa City, Iowa; University of Iowa | March 1926 | Michigan (Unofficial) |
| Track and Field | 1927 NCAA Track and Field Championships | 6th | Soldier Field (Illinois) Chicago, Illinois; University of Chicago | June 1927 | Illinois (Unofficial) |

== Season results ==
=== Team titles, by university ===
- No official team titles awarded this season

== Cumulative results ==
=== Team titles, by university ===
| Rank | University | Titles |
|---|---|---|
| 1 | California | 1 |
| 1 | Illinois | 1 |
| 1 | Michigan | 1 |
| 1 | Stanford | 1 |
