= 1923–24 NCAA season =

Tournament information
- Dates: August 1923–June 1924

Tournament statistics
- Sports: 2 official
- Championships: 1 official 1 unofficial

The 1923–24 NCAA season was the fourth season of official NCAA sponsorship of team and individual national championships for college athletics in the United States, coinciding with the 1923–24 collegiate academic school year.

Swimming and diving were added as a second sport, bringing the total of sponsored sports to two. However, a men's track and field championship was not held in 1924, keeping the number of championships at one.

Before the introduction of the separate University Division and College Division before the 1955–56 school year, the NCAA only conduced a single national championship for each sport. Women's sports were not added until 1981–82.

== Championships ==
| Sport/Event | Championship | Edition | Finals Site Host(s) | Date(s) | Team Champion(s) |
|---|---|---|---|---|---|
| Swimming and Diving | 1924 NCAA Swimming and Diving Championships | 1st | Scott Natatorium; Annapolis, Maryland; United States Naval Academy | March 1924 | Northwestern (Unofficial) |
| Track and Field | Not held | — | — | — | — |

== Season results ==
=== Team titles, by university ===
- No official team titles awarded this season

== Cumulative results ==
=== Team titles, by university ===
| Rank | University | Titles |
|---|---|---|
| 1 | California; Illinois; Michigan | 1 |
