= 1940 NCAA swimming and diving championships =

American college aquatic sports competition

- Host city: (Connecticut) New Haven, CT
- Date(s): March 29, 1940
- Venue(s): Payne Whitney Gymnasium; Yale University
- Teams: 13

The 1940 NCAA swimming and diving championships were contested March 29, 1940 at the Payne Whitney Gymnasium at Yale University in New Haven, Connecticut at the fourth annual NCAA-sanctioned swim meet to determine the team and individual national champions of men's collegiate swimming and diving among its member programs in the United States.

For the fourth consecutive year, Michigan topped the team standings, edging out hosts Yale by three points. It was the Wolverines' fourth title in program history and the fourth for coach Matt Mann.

== Team results ==
- (H) = Hosts
- (DC) = Defending champions
- Italics = Debut appearance

Rank	Team	Points
1st place, gold medalist(s)	Michigan (DC)	45
2nd place, silver medalist(s)	Yale (H)	42
3rd place, bronze medalist(s)	Ohio State	39
4	Wayne (MI)	25
5	Princeton	20
6	Harvard	12
7	USC	8
8	Army	4
9	Brown	2
9	Franklin & Marshall	2
9	Kenyon	2
9	North Central (IL)	2
9	Texas	2

== Individual events ==
=== Swimming ===
Event	Champion	Team	Time
50-yard freestyle	Guy Lumsden	Wayne (MI)	0:23.1
100-yard freestyle	Gus Sharemet	Michigan	0:51.8
220-yard freestyle	Howard Johnson	Yale	2:13.1
440-yard freestyle	Andrew Clark	Wayne (MI)	4:50.0
1,500-meter freestyle	Harold Stanhope (DC)	Ohio State	20:15.8
150-yard backstroke	Al Vande Weghe (DC)	Princeton	1:34.6
200-yard butterfly	John Higgins	Ohio State	2:23.7
400-yard freestyle relay	Edward Hutchens; John Gillis; Charles Barker; John Sharemet	Michigan (DC)	3:31.0
300-yard medley relay	Francis Heydt; John Sharemet; Gus Sharemet	Michigan	2:54.9

=== Diving ===
Event	Champion	Team	Score
One-meter diving	Al Patnik (DC)	Ohio State	147.04
Three-meter diving	Earl Clark	Ohio State	166.82

== See also ==
- List of college swimming and diving teams
