= 1938 NCAA swimming and diving championships =

American college aquatic sports competition

1938 NCAA Swimming and Diving Championships
- Host city: New Brunswick, New Jersey
- Venue(s): College Avenue Gym; Rutgers University
- Teams: 16
- Events: 11

The 1938 NCAA swimming and diving championships were contested at the College Avenue Gym at Rutgers University in New Brunswick, New Jersey at the 15th annual NCAA-sanctioned swim meet to determine the team and individual national champions of men's collegiate swimming and diving in the United States.

Michigan repeated as national champions, edging rivals Ohio State by one point (46–45) in the team standings. It was the Wolverines' second official national title.

== Team results ==
- (H) = Hosts
- (DC) = Defending champions
- Italics = Debut appearance

Rank	Team	Points
1st place, gold medalist(s)	Michigan (DC)	46
2nd place, silver medalist(s)	Ohio State	45
3rd place, bronze medalist(s)	Harvard	36
4	Princeton	22
5	Yale	18
6	Iowa	7
7	Rutgers (H)	5
8	Army	4
8	Stanford	4
8	Texas	4
11	Columbia	3
11	Illinois	3
11	USC	3
14	Franklin & Marshall	2
15	Minnesota	1
15	Pittsburgh	1

== Individual events ==
=== Swimming ===
Event	Champion	Team	Time
50-yard freestyle	Ed Kirar (DC)	Michigan	23.2
100-yard freestyle	Ed Kirar (DC)	Michigan	52.7
220-yard freestyle	(Australia) William Kendall	Harvard	2:12.0
440-yard freestyle	(Australia) William Kendall	Harvard	4:48.9
1,500-meter freestyle	John Macionis (DC)	Yale	20:15.2
150-yard backstroke	Al Vande Weghe	Princeton	1:34.2
200-yard butterfly	Richard R. Hough	Princeton	2:23.4
400-yard freestyle relay	Waldemar Tomski; Edward Hutchens; Tom Haynie; Ed Kirar	Michigan	3:32.7
300-yard medley relay	Al Vande Weghe; Richard R. Hough; Hendrik Van Oss	Princeton	2:54.7

=== Diving ===
Event	Champion	Team	Score
One-meter diving	Al Patnik	Ohio State	145.14
Three-meter diving	Al Patnik	Ohio State	143.92

== See also ==
- List of college swimming and diving teams
