= 1927–28 NCAA season =

1927–28 NCAA championships
Tournament information
- Dates: August 1927–June 1928

Tournament statistics
- Sports: 3
- Championships: 3

The 1927–28 NCAA championships were contested by the NCAA during the 1927–28 collegiate academic school year, the NCAA's seventh season of championships, to determine the team and individual national champions of its three sponsored sports.

Wrestling was introduced as the NCAA's third officially-sponsored sport this season.

Before the introduction of the separate University Division and College Division before the 1955–56 school year, a single national championship was conducted for each sport. Women's sports were not added until 1981–82.

== Championships ==
Sport/Event	Championship	Edition	Finals Site Host(s)	Date(s)	Team Champion(s)
Swimming and Diving	1928 NCAA Swimming and Diving Championships	5th	Hutchinson Gymnasium; Philadelphia, PA; University of Pennsylvania	March 1928	Michigan (Unofficial)
Track and Field	1928 NCAA Track and Field Championships	7th	Soldier Field (Illinois) Chicago, IL; University of Chicago	June 1928	Stanford
Wrestling	1928 NCAA Wrestling Championships	1st	State Gymnasium; Ames, IA; Iowa Agricultural College	March 1928	Oklahoma A&M

== Season results ==
=== Team titles, by university ===
Rank	University	Titles
1	Oklahoma A&M	1
1	Stanford	1

== Cumulative results ==
=== Team titles, by university ===
Rank	University	Titles
1	Stanford	2
2	California	1
2	Illinois	1
2	Michigan	1
2	Oklahoma A&M	1
