= 1925–26 NCAA season =

1925–26 NCAA championships
Tournament information
- Dates: August 1925–June 1926

Tournament statistics
- Sports: 2
- Championships: 2

The 1925–26 NCAA championships were contested by the NCAA during the 1925–26 collegiate academic school year, the NCAA's fifth year of hosting championships, to determine the team and individual national champions of its two sponsored sports.

Before the introduction of the separate University Division and College Division before the 1955–56 school year, the NCAA only conduced a single national championship for each sport. Women's sports were not added until 1981–82.

== Championships ==
Sport/Event	Championship	Edition	Finals Site Host(s)	Date(s)	Team Champion(s)
Swimming and Diving	1926 NCAA Swimming and Diving Championships	3rd	Scott Natatorium; Annapolis, Maryland; United States Naval Academy	March 1926	Navy (Unofficial)
Track and Field	1926 NCAA Track and Field Championships	5th	Soldier Field; Chicago, Illinois; University of Chicago	June 1926	USC (Unofficial)

== Season results ==
=== Team titles, by university ===
- No official team titles awarded this season

== Cumulative results ==
=== Team titles, by university ===
Rank	University	Titles
1	California	1
1	Illinois	1
1	Michigan	1
1	Stanford	1
