= 1995 NCAA Division I Men's Swimming and Diving Championships =

American college aquatic sports competition

1995 NCAA Division I Swimming and Diving Championships
- Host city: Indianapolis, Indiana
- Date: March 1995
- Venue(s): Indiana University Natatorium; Indiana University

The 1995 NCAA Division I Men's Swimming and Diving Championships were contested in March 1995 at the Indiana University Natatorium in Indianapolis, Indiana at the 72nd annual NCAA-sanctioned swim meet to determine the team and individual national champions of Division I men's collegiate swimming and diving in the United States.

Michigan topped the team standings, finishing 86 points ahead of three-time defending champions Stanford. It was the Wolverines' eleventh title but their first since 1961. It was the first title for coach Jon Urbanchek.

== Team standings ==
- Note: Top 10 only
- (H) = Hosts
- ^{(DC)} = Defending champions
- Full results

Rank	Team	Points
1st place, gold medalist(s)	Michigan	561
2nd place, silver medalist(s)	Stanford ^{(DC)}	475
3rd place, bronze medalist(s)	Auburn	393
4	Texas	346
5	California	234
6	Tennessee	230
7	SMU	218
8	Arizona	211 1/2
9	Minnesota	211
10	USC	189

== See also ==
- List of college swimming and diving teams
