= 1961 NCAA swimming and diving championships =

American college aquatic sports competition

- Host city: (Washington (state)) Seattle, Washington
- Date(s): March 1961
- Venue(s): Pavilion Pool; University of Washington
- Teams: 27
- Events: 16

The 1961 NCAA swimming and diving championships were contested at the 25th annual championship swim meet sanctioned and hosted by the NCAA to determine the individual and team national champions of men's collegiate swimming and diving among its Division I member programs in the United States, culminating the 1960–61 NCAA swimming and diving season.

These championships were hosted by the University of Washington at the Pavilion Pool in Seattle, Washington during March 1961.

Michigan finished twenty-three points ahead of defending champions USC in the team championship standings, the Wolverines' tenth national title and fourth in five seasons.

== Team standings ==
- (H) = Hosts
- (DC) = Defending champions
- Italics = Debut appearance

Rank	Team	Points
Rank	Team	Points
1st place, gold medalist(s)	Michigan	85
2nd place, silver medalist(s)	USC (DC)	62
3rd place, bronze medalist(s)	Ohio State	59
4	Harvard	26
5	Michigan State	24
6	Yale	20
7	Minnesota	18
8	Oklahoma	13.5
9	Cincinnati	12
10	Princeton	10.5
11	Florida State	9
12	Iowa	8
13	Denver	7
13	North Central (IL)	7
15	Texas	5
16	Southern Illinois	4
17	Miami (OH)	3.5
17	Navy	3.5
19	Bowling Green State	3
19	SMU	3
19	Wisconsin	3
22	Ohio	2
22	Purdue	2
22	Stanford	2
22	Washington (H)	2
26	Illinois	1
26	Washington State	1

== Individual events ==
=== Swimming ===
Event	Champion	Team	Time
50 yard freestyle	Frank Legacki	Michigan	21.4
100 yard freestyle	Steven Jackman	Minnesota	48.5
220 yard freestyle	(Australia) Murray Rose	USC	2:00.6
440 yard freestyle	(Australia) Murray Rose	USC	4:17.9
1,500 meter freestyle	(Australia) Murray Rose	USC	17:21.8
100 yard backstroke	Charles Bittick (DC)	USC	53.9
200 yard backstroke	Charles Bittick (DC)	USC	1:57.1
100 yard breaststroke	Richard Nelson	Michigan	1:02.1
200 yard breaststroke	Ron Clark (DC)	Michigan	2:13.4
100 yard butterfly	Dave Gillanders	Michigan	52.9
200 yard butterfly	Dave Gillanders	Michigan	1:58.6
200 yard individual medley	John Kelso	Denver	2:02.9
400 yard freestyle relay	Robert Kaufmann; Alan Engelberg; William Zantgraf; Bruce Hunter	Harvard	3:18.3
400 yard medley relay	L.B. Schaefer; Tom Kovacs; Artie Wolfe; John Plain	Ohio State	3:40.3

=== Diving ===
Event	Champion	Team	Score
1 meter diving	Curt Genders	Florida State	459.40
3 meter diving	Lou Vitucci	Ohio State	491.65

== See also ==
- 1961 NAIA swimming and diving championships
- List of college swimming and diving teams
