= 1929 NCAA Swimming and Diving Championships =

American college aquatic sports competition

- Host city: St. Louis, Missouri
- Venue(s): Francis Gymnasium; Washington University in St. Louis

The 1929 NCAA Swimming and Diving Championships were contested at Francis Gymnasium at Washington University in St. Louis in St. Louis, Missouri as part of the sixth annual NCAA swim meet to determine the team and individual national champions of men's collegiate swimming and diving in the United States.

Only individual championships were officially contested during the first thirteen-NCAA sponsored swimming and diving championships. Unofficial team standings were kept but a team title was not officially awarded until 1937.

Northwestern is acknowledged as this year's unofficial team champion, the third such title for the Wildcats.

== See also ==
- List of college swimming and diving teams
