= 1933 NCAA Swimming and Diving Championships =

American college aquatic sports competition

- Host city: New Haven, Connecticut
- Venue(s): Kiputh Pool; Payne Whitney Gymnasium; Yale University

The 1933 NCAA Swimming and Diving Championships were contested at Kiputh Pool at Payne Whitney Gymnasium at Yale University in New Haven, Connecticut as part of the 10th annual NCAA swim meet to determine the team and individual national champions of men's collegiate swimming and diving in the United States.

Only individual championships were officially contested during the first thirteen-NCAA sponsored swimming and diving championships. Unofficial team standings were kept but a team title was not officially awarded until 1937.

Northwestern are acknowledged as this year's unofficial team champions, the fourth such title for the Wildcats.

== See also ==
- List of college swimming and diving teams
