= 1932 NCAA Swimming and Diving Championships =

American college aquatic sports competition

- Host city: (Michigan) Ann Arbor, MI
- Venue(s): Intramural Sports Building; University of Michigan

The 1932 NCAA Swimming and Diving Championships were contested at the Intramural Sports Building at the University of Michigan in Ann Arbor, Michigan as part of the ninth annual NCAA swim meet to determine the team and individual national champions of men's collegiate swimming and diving in the United States.

Only individual championships were officially contested during the first thirteen-NCAA sponsored swimming and diving championships. Unofficial team standings were kept but a team title was not officially awarded until 1937.

Hosts Michigan are acknowledged as this year's unofficial team champions, the fourth such title (and second consecutive) for the Wolverines.

== See also ==
- List of college swimming and diving teams
