= 1934 NCAA Swimming and Diving Championships =

American college aquatic sports competition

- Host city: Columbus, Ohio
- Venue(s): Ohio State Natatorium; Ohio State University

The 1934 NCAA Swimming and Diving Championships were contested at the Ohio State Natatorium at Ohio State University in Columbus, Ohio at the 11th annual NCAA-sanctioned swim meet to determine the team and individual national champions of men's collegiate swimming and diving in the United States.

Only individual championships were officially contested during the first thirteen-NCAA sponsored swimming and diving championships. This was the last year of keeping unofficial team standings before the team championship was awarded for the first time the following year.

Michigan are acknowledged as this year's unofficial team champions, the fifth such title for the Wolverines.

== See also ==
- List of college swimming and diving teams
