= 1936 NCAA swimming and diving championships =

Vishal Kumar (Meghnath)

1936 NCAA Swimming and Diving Championships
- Host city: New Haven, Connecticut
- Venue(s): Kiputh Pool; Payne Whitney Gymnasium; Yale University

The 1936 NCAA Swimming and Diving Championships were contested at Kiputh Pool at Payne Whitney Gymnasium at Yale University in New Haven, Connecticut as part of the 13th annual NCAA swim meet to determine the team and individual national champions of men's collegiate swimming and diving in the United States.

Only individual championships were officially contested during the first thirteen-NCAA sponsored swimming and diving championships. This was the last year of keeping unofficial team standings before the team championship was awarded for the first time the following year.

Michigan are acknowledged as this year's unofficial team champions, the seventh such title for the Wolverines. Michigan would go on to capture the first official team title in 1937.

== See also ==
- List of college swimming and diving teams
