= 1985 NCAA Division I Men's Swimming and Diving Championships =

American college aquatic sports competition

1985 NCAA Division I Swimming and Diving Championships
- Host city: Austin, Texas
- Date(s): March 1985
- Venue(s): Texas Swimming Center; University of Texas

The 1985 NCAA Division I Men's Swimming and Diving Championships were contested in March 1985 at the Texas Swimming Center at the University of Texas in Austin, Texas at the 62nd annual NCAA-sanctioned swim meet to determine the team and individual national champions of Division I men's collegiate swimming and diving in the United States. The men's and women's titles would not be held at the same site until 2006.

Stanford topped the team standings, the Cardinal's second men's title and first since 1967.

== Team standings ==
- Note: Top 10 only
- (H) = Hosts
- ^{(DC)} = Defending champions
- Full results

Rank	Team	Points
1st place, gold medalist(s)	Stanford	403 1/2
2nd place, silver medalist(s)	Florida ^{(DC)}	329
3rd place, bronze medalist(s)	Texas (H)	306
4	California	294
5	USC	230 1/2
6	UCLA	224
7	SMU	194
8	Alabama	179
9	Arizona	162
10	Auburn	121

== See also ==
- List of college swimming and diving teams
