= Frank Legacki =

American swimmer (1939–2020)

Personal information
- Born: 1939 Tacony, Philadelphia, Pennsylvania, U.S.
- Died: October 22, 2020 (aged 80–81) Ann Arbor, Michigan, U.S.

Sport
- Sport: Swimming
Medal record
Men's swimming
Representing Michigan
NCAA
Gold medal – first place	1959 Ithaca	Team title
Gold medal – first place	1959 Ithaca	100 yard freestyle
Gold medal – first place	1959 Ithaca	400 yard freestyle relay
Gold medal – first place	1961 Seattle	50 yard freestyle

Frank Legacki (1939 – October 22, 2020) was an American championship swimmer. He won two individual, one relay, and two team NCAA swimming championships between 1959 and 1961 and set American records in the 50-yard freestyle. He was also a two-time National A.A.U. Champion in the 100 Butterfly and set American records in this event, too. He was inducted into the University of Michigan Athletic Hall of Honor in 1994.

== Early years ==
A native of the Tacony neighborhood of Philadelphia, Pennsylvania, Legacki attended North Catholic High School as a freshman, and transferred to Father Judge High School when it was opened in 1954 for his sophomore year. He helped the Father Judge Crusaders win the Philadelphia City League championship, and Legacki won the 50-yard and 100-yard freestyle events at the National Catholic Swimming Championships.

== University of Michigan ==
Legacki enrolled at the University of Michigan, where he was a three-time NCAA champion. Legacki's individual NCAA championships were as follows:

- 1959 100-yard freestyle, 49.6
- 1959 400-yard freestyle relay (with John McGuire, Carl Woolley, and Richard Hanley), 3:21.6
- 1961 50-yard freestyle, 21.4

He also helped Michigan win the NCAA team championships in 1959 and 1961. During his time at Michigan, he was also a two time National A.A.U. Champion and set an American record in the 100-yard butterfly in both 1959 and 1961. . When Legacki set the American record in the butterfly in April 1961, and the UPI reported on the feat as follows:

"Frank Legacki of Michigan joined the other winners in establishing American records with a time of 51.9 in the 100-yard butterfly. The feat was particularly amazing since Legacki had only 15 minutes earlier competed in the freestyle finals."

He also set the NCAA and American record in the 50-yard freestyle in March 1961 with a time of 21.4 at the NCAA championships in Seattle.

Legacki received both a bachelor's degree in history (1962) and an M.B.A. degree (1964) from the University of Michigan.

Legacki also served as the head coach of the Ann Arbor Swim Club from 1963 to 1964. Swimming was not yet a varsity sport for women at the time, and the Ann Arbor Swim Club was the team for which University of Michigan women swimmers competed. During his tenure as head coach, Legacki conducted a three-week training camp for the team in Ft. Lauderdale, Florida. Legacki later recalled that, despite hot and humid weather in Florida, his swimmers wore long-sleeved blouses in public: "I asked them why they chose long versus short sleeves, and they told me that when they cut steak, short sleeves showed their muscles. They were quite conscious about it and preferred to cover up." Legacki resigned as the Swim Club's head coach in 1964 after graduating from the university with his M.B.A.

== Business career ==
After graduating from the University of Michigan, Legacki has had a long career in business. He started his career in advertising with Ogilvy & Mather in New York. He was the president and CEO of Kaepa, Inc., an athletic footwear company based in San Antonio, Texas. In 1986, he led a leveraged buyout of Kaepa from Wolverine World Wide, Inc., and sold the company in 1996. He has also served as the president of Andover Consulting Group in Boston, Massachusetts, and vice-president of marketing at Converse, Inc. in [North Reading, Massachusetts], and managing director of The Strategic Consulting Group of Marketing Corporation of America, in Westport, Connecticut.

In 1997, Legacki was one of the founding investors in Rosebud Solutions, a healthware software company. Legacki's wife, Alicia Torres, was the company's president and CEO, and the two moved the company to Ann Arbor, Michigan in 1998. Legacki served as a senior executive at Rosebud until it was sold to McKesson Corp.

In 2008, Legacki was selected to head an office for venture capital fund, Fletcher Spaght Ventures, overseeing the fund's Michigan investment strategy.

== Death ==
Legacki died on 22 October 2020, aged 81.

== Honors ==
Legacki was inducted into the University of Michigan Athletic Hall of Honor in 1994. He has also been inducted into the Father Judge High School Hall of Fame. and the State of Pennsylvania Hall of Fame, Metro Philadelphia Chapter.

== See also ==
- University of Michigan Athletic Hall of Honor
- Tacony, Philadelphia, Pennsylvania#Coming of the Railroad
