= 1935 NCAA Swimming and Diving Championships =

American college aquatic sports competition

- Host city: Cambridge, Massachusetts
- Venue(s): Malkin Athletic Center; Harvard University

The 1935 NCAA Swimming and Diving Championships were contested at the Malkin Athletic Center at Harvard University in Cambridge, Massachusetts as part of the 12th annual NCAA swim meet to determine the team and individual national champions of men's collegiate swimming and diving in the United States.

Only individual championships were officially contested during the first thirteen-NCAA sponsored swimming and diving championships. Unofficial team standings were kept but a team title was not officially awarded until 1937.

Michigan is acknowledged as this year's unofficial team champion, the sixth such title (and second consecutive) for the Wolverines.

== See also ==
- List of college swimming and diving teams
