= Jean Freeman =

American swimming coach (1950–2010)

Jean K. Freeman
- Freeman during her coaching career

Biographical details
- Born: May 5, 1950; Minneapolis, Minnesota
- Died: October 14, 2010 (aged 60); St. Paul, Minnesota
- Education: University of Minnesota (1972)

Playing career
- Circa 1966-71: Ascension Swim Club; Coached by Carol Gustafson
- 1968-1972: University of Minnesota
- Positions: Freestyle, Butterfly Competitor

Coaching career (HC unless noted)
- 1973-2004: University of Minnesota

Head coaching record
- Overall: 208 dual meet wins

Accomplishments and honors

Championships
- 2 Big 10 Championships (1999, 2000) (U. Minnesota Women)

Awards
- Big 10 Coach of Year (84, 86, 96, 99); CSCAA Outstanding Service Award (1999); ASCA Hall of Fame (2011); Minnesota Women's Athletic Hall Fame (2000)

Jean K. Freeman (March 5, 1950– October 14, 2010) was an American competitive swimmer for the University of Minnesota and their Head Women's swimming coach for 31 years, from 1973 to 2004. Prior to 1975, when the Minnesota Women's swim team became better funded by the University, she worked part-time, and had to take on additional work to support herself, receiving very little compensation. Overcoming early funding obstacles in women's sports at Minnesota, she led the women's swim team to Big Ten Conference titles in both 1999 and 2000. As a Pioneer in women's collegiate swimming, in 1999, the College Swimming Coaches Association of American honored her with their Outstanding Service Award, making Freeman the first woman to achieve the Association's highest honor.

== Early years and swimming ==
Jean Freeman was born March 5, 1950 in greater Minneapolis, Minnesota, one of around five siblings to William C. and Kathryn Freeman and attended Regina High School, a girl's Catholic school in greater Minneapolis.

A redhead in her youth, Freeman swam for the Ascension Swim Club of Minneapolis, finishing second in the 200-yard butterfly on May 1, 1966, helping to lead the team to the championship at the Minnesota AAU Jr. Olympic meet. She continued to swim with the Ascension Swim Club, an AAU team, throughout her High School years largely under the coaching of Carol Gustafson. The team met at a small Northside Minneapolis pool that has since been closed. Gustafson, a former swimmer for the University of Minnesota, coached the Ascension swimmers beginning in 1940, and remained as coach for over 40 years. Freeman was later coached by Marty Knight at the Ascension Club after 1968. Gustafson was particularly skilled at coaching proper stroke technique for all the competitive strokes, and after retiring from coaching at Ascension, he coached stroke technique at the University of Minnesota during Freeman's tenure as Women's Head Coach. A number of Gustafson's many students at Ascension later became coaches. Being mentored in coaching stroke technique was an important skill to acquire for Freeman as she aspired at least by her early college years to a career in coaching.

Freeman continued swimming with the Ascension team on occasion during her summer breaks from the University of Minnesota, and did some coaching for the team, as well as performing some management tasks, such as preparing the Ascension team for the 1970 AAU Regional Championship in Omaha. As noted, several of the Ascension coaches were former University of Minnesota swimmers, and several of the University swimmers, like Freeman, continued to swim with the Ascension team during their summer breaks.

== U. of Minnesota swimmer ==
After High School, Freeman swam for the University of Minnesota from 1968 to 1972, graduating in 1973 with a Physical Education degree. The team was loosely structured during the time, likely had no full-time coach, and few digitized records remain of Freeman's participation.

== Coaching at U. Minnesota ==
Around 1972-73, Minnesota's part-time Women's swim coach could not perform their duties due to illness, so Freeman filled in as a student coach, eventually accepting the Head Coaching position despite there being very little funding at the time for a woman's coach. Until the women's program at the University received funding in 1975-76, Freeman worked several jobs on the side to make ends meet. According to one source, she worked part-time her first year for a salary of fifty dollars. In the 70's during her early years with the University of Minnesota, she earned pocket money working at the Crystal Pool in Minneapolis.

=== Growth of U. of M. women's swimming ===
Freeman served as the Women's Head coach at Minnesota from 1973-2004. In Freeman's early years with the team, they practiced at Minnesota's Norris gymnasium, used nearly exclusively by women. The Norris gymasium pool had no lockers, and housed a pool that was smaller more worn, and older than the pool used by the men's team at Cooke Hall. Once a week, Freeman's women's team had a chance to practice at the Cooke Hall pool in the evenings around 6:30 pm. Nonetheless, as many as 30 women belonged to Freeman's early teams.

The men's athletic budget at Minnesota was 2.2 million in the 1973-74 season, while the entire budget for women's sports was $35,000, with very little of that allocated to the women's swim team. With a limited budget, the women's team could initially only afford to swim against local schools. With the effects of Title IX slowing being implemented, the women's sports budget at Minnesota was quadrupled in 1974, allowing nearly all of Minnesota's women's coaches to work full time. The beginning of a very small allocation for women's athletic scholarships were included in the new budget. In 1977, former U. Minnesota swimmer Terry Nieszner (Ganley) began serving as an Assistant to Coach Freeman and would remain as a women's coach for decades. Freeman had coached Niezner at both Minnesota and the Ascension Swim Club. With continued growth and recognition of the women's swim program, Minnesota's Freeman Aquatics Center, built in 1990, and renamed in Freeman's honor in 2014, gave both the men's and women's swim team access to new, modern facilities.

Achieving as a coach despite early obstacles, during her career tenure Freeman mentored 48 of her women athletes to titles in the Big Ten Conference, which included 53 individual and 23 relay events for a total of 76 titles. Freeman was succeeded as Coach by Terry Nieszner Ganley who co-coached the team and was Freeman's first All-American swimmer, having placed twelfth in the backstroke at the National Association for Intercollegiate Athletics for Women (AIAW) Championships at Penn State in 1974. The AIAW was a women's conference, as the NCAA did not include women's sports. Coach Nieszner Ganley had to raise funds for travel and lodging to attend the meet. In her peak years, Freeman coached the U. Minnesota Golden Gophers Women's team to Big Ten titles in 1999 and 2000 and was named the Big Ten's Women's Coach of the Year four times encompassing the years 1984, 1986, 1996, and 1999. She led the Minnesota women to finish within the top 20 at the NCAA in seven years of her coaching tenure.

=== Outstanding swimmers ===
Although the list is long, some of the more outstanding swimmers who earned multiple All American honors during Freeman's coaching tenure include outstanding competitor Gretchen Hegener, an NCAA National Champion in 1996, one of only two coached by Freeman. Hegener was a Big 10 breaststroke champion, who earned five All American honors and swam from 1995-1998. Hegener was possibly one of Freeman's most accomplished swimmers. Freeman also coached distance freestyler Olga Splichilova who won five All-American honors from 1995-1998, Trina Thames who won three All-American honors from 1991-1992, butterfly and medley specialist Tanya Schuh, who won three All-American honors from 1994-1997, and Tami Grewenow who won three All-American honors and two honorable mentions from 1987-1990. Olympian Megan Quann though she did not attend the University, may have been coached briefly by Freeman while a member of the U.S. National team.

In international coaching, at the 2003 South Korea World University Games, Freeman served as an Assistant Coach. Leading the team to win the Quebec Cup in 1992, she served as coaching assistant to the women’s US Swimming's Junior National Team.

Staying active with the University community, Freeman was President of the University of Minnesota Club Hall of Fame from her coaching retirement in 2004 through January 2010.

She died October 14, 2010 at Regions Hospital in St. Paul, Minnesota of colon cancer and was survived by her mother Kathryn, two sisters and three brothers. Her funeral was held mid-day at St. Joan of Arc on October 19, 2010 and she was buried at Sunset Memorial Park in Minneapolis.

=== Honors ===
She was inducted in the American Swimming Coaches Association's Hall of Fame in 2011, and in 2000 for her pioneering work as a women's collegiate swim coach had been formerly inducted into the Minnesota Women’s Athletics Hall of Fame. In 2006, she became a member of the University of Minnesota Aquatics Hall of Fame, and was made a member of the University's "M" Club Hall of Fame in 2000.

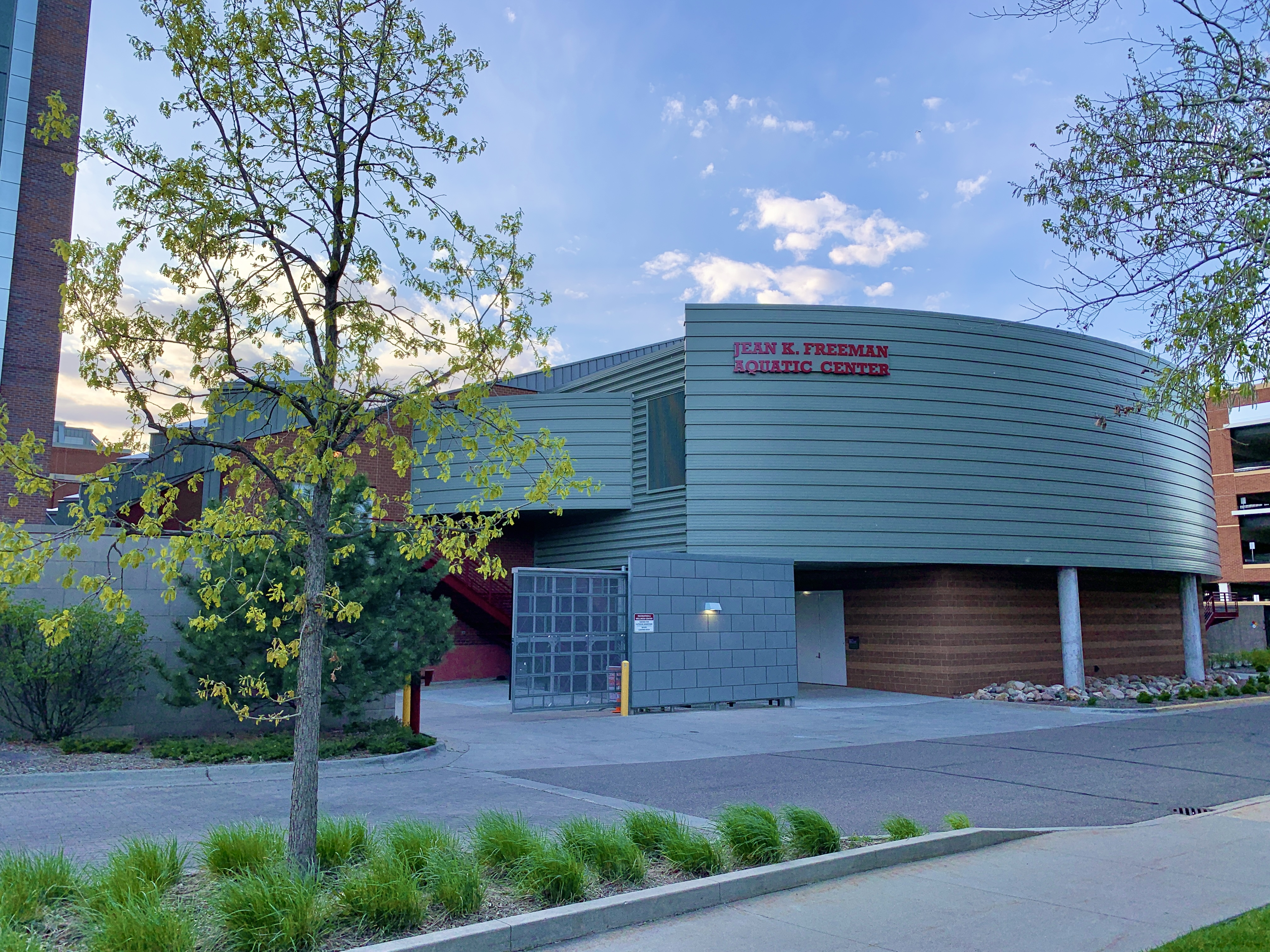
Jean K. Freeman Aquatic Center

In a distinctive honor on December 6, 2014, the University of Minnesota renamed its swimming and diving complex, completed in 1990, the Jean K. Freeman Aquatic Center.

The College Swimming Coaches Association of America (CSCAA) honored her with their Outstanding Service Award in 1999, also known as the National Collegiate and Scholastic Swimming Trophy, making her the first woman to receive the recognition, their highest honor, in the CSCAA's forty year history.

The Jean Freeman Scholarship was established in Freeman's honor, and is given to six college coaches on an annual basis. The scholarship gives honorees a CSCAA Meeting registration at their annual meeting and their Academy for Coaches. The award is given to CSCAA members with at least two years coaching, preferably for a college, and the recipients must be currently employed coaches with less than three years as a Head Coach.
