= 1927 NCAA Swimming and Diving Championships =

American college aquatic sports competition

- Host city: Iowa City, Iowa
- Venue(s): Field House Pool; University of Iowa

The 1927 NCAA Swimming and Diving Championships were contested at the Field House Pool at the University of Iowa in Iowa City, Iowa as part of the fourth annual NCAA swim meet to determine the team and individual national champions of men's collegiate swimming and diving in the United States.

Only individual championships were officially contested during the first thirteen-NCAA sponsored swimming and diving championships. Unofficial team standings were kept but a team title was not officially awarded until 1937.

Michigan is acknowledged as this year's unofficial team champion, the first such title for the Wolverines.

== See also ==
- List of college swimming and diving teams
