= 1931 NCAA Swimming and Diving Championships =

American college aquatic sports competition

- Host city: Evanston, Illinois
- Date(s): March 28, 1931
- Venue(s): Lake Shore Athletic Club; Chicago, Illinois

The 1931 NCAA Swimming and Diving Championships were contested at Lake Shore Athletic Club in Chicago, Illinois as part of the eighth annual NCAA swim meet to determine the team and individual national champions of men's collegiate swimming and diving in the United States.

Only individual championships were officially contested during the first thirteen-NCAA sponsored swimming and diving championships. Unofficial team standings were kept, but a team title was not officially awarded until 1937.

By scoring 28 points to second-place Rutgers' 22 points, Michigan won the unofficial team championship, the Wolverines' third such title.

== See also ==
- List of college swimming and diving teams
