= 1924 NCAA Swimming and Diving Championships =

American college aquatic sports competition

- Host city: Annapolis, Maryland
- Venue(s): Scott Natatorium; United States Naval Academy

The 1924 NCAA Swimming and Diving Championships were contested as part of the first annual NCAA swim meet to determine the team and individual national champions of men's collegiate swimming and diving in the United States.

The championship was hosted by the United States Naval Academy at Scott Natatorium in Annapolis, Maryland.

Only individual championships were officially contested during the first thirteen-NCAA sponsored swimming and diving championships. Unofficial team standings were kept but a team title was not officially awarded until 1937.

Northwestern is acknowledged as this year's unofficial team champion, the first title for the Wildcats.

== Individual results ==
=== Swimming ===
Event	Champion	Team	Time
100-meter freestyle	Ralph Breyer	Northwestern	1:01.6
200-meter freestyle	Ralph Breyer	Northwestern	2:27.6
400-meter freestyle	Richard Howell	Northwestern	5:28.9
1,500-meter freestyle	Richard Howell	Northwestern	22:41.0
100-meter backstroke	Arthur Rule	Navy	1:19.0
200-meter breaststroke	George Olmstead	Williams	3:02.8

=== Diving ===
Event	Champion	Team
One-meter diving	Robert Pegg	Rutgers

== See also ==
- List of college swimming and diving teams
