= 1925 NCAA Swimming and Diving Championships =

American college aquatic sports competition

- Host city: Evanston, Illinois
- Venue(s): Patten Gymnasium; Northwestern University

The 1925 NCAA Swimming and Diving Championships were contested at Patten Gymnasium at Northwestern University in Evanston, Illinois as part of the second annual NCAA swim meet to determine the team and individual national champions of men's collegiate swimming and diving in the United States.

Only individual championships were officially contested during the first thirteen-NCAA sponsored swimming and diving championships. Unofficial team standings were kept but a team title was not officially awarded until 1937.

Navy is acknowledged as this year's unofficial team champion, the first such title for the Midshipmen.

== See also ==
- List of college swimming and diving teams
