= 1926 NCAA Swimming and Diving Championships =

American college aquatic sports competition

- Host city: Annapolis, Maryland
- Venue(s): Scott Natatorium; United States Naval Academy

The 1926 NCAA Swimming and Diving Championships were contested as part of the third annual NCAA swim meet to determine the team and individual national champions of men's collegiate swimming and diving in the United States.

The championship was hosted by the United States Naval Academy at Scott Natatorium in Annapolis, Maryland.

Only individual championships were officially contested during the first thirteen-NCAA sponsored swimming and diving championships. Unofficial team standings were kept but a team title was not officially awarded until 1937.

Navy is acknowledged as this year's unofficial team champion, the second such title (and second consecutive) for the Midshipmen.

== See also ==
- List of college swimming and diving teams
