= Jean K. Freeman Aquatic Center =

Swimming venue at the University of Minnesota

Coordinates: 44°58′32″N 93°13′45″W

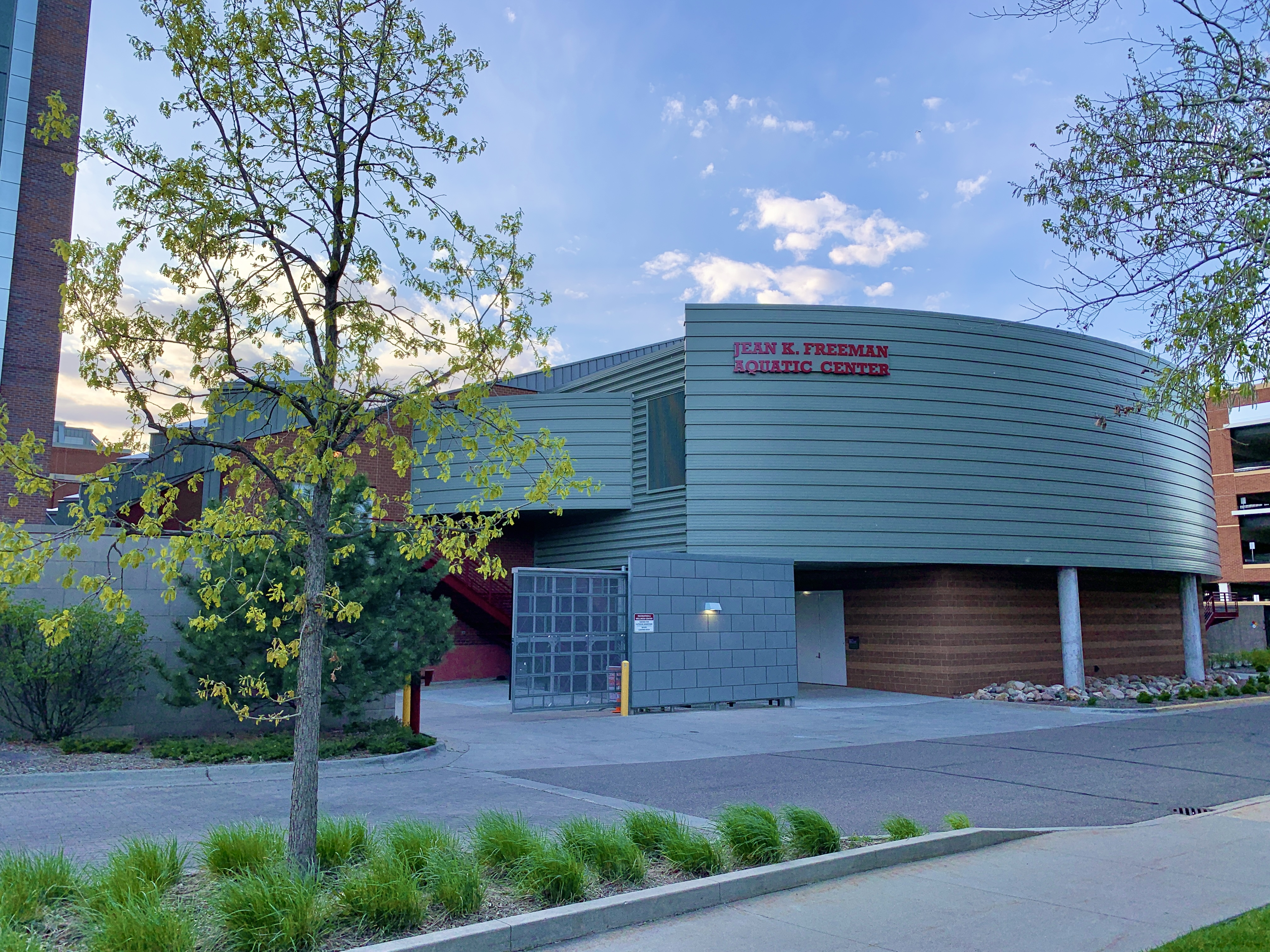
- Interactive map of Jean K. Freeman Aquatic Center
- Address: Minneapolis, Minnesota, USA
- Capacity: 2,546 (1,346 Permanent)

Construction
- Built: 1990

The Jean K. Freeman Aquatic Center is a venue for competitive swimming at the University of Minnesota in the United States, constructed in 1990. It is named for Jean Freeman, the university's long-time women's swimming coach. The main competition pool is named after Dorothy L. Sheppard, a multi-sport athlete for the University in the 1920s and a donor to the Aquatics Center and a benefactor of women's sports at the university.
