= Louis Vitucci =

American diver

Personal information
- Full name: Louis Vincent Vitucci
- Nationality: American
- Born: December 4, 1940 (age 85) Mount Vernon, New York, United States

Sport
- Sport: Diving

Louis Vitucci (born December 14, 1940) is an American diver. He competed in the men's 10 metre platform event at the 1964 Summer Olympics.

== Early life and education ==
Louis Vitucci was born on December 14, 1940, in Mount Vernon, New York. He attended The Ohio State University, where he became a prominent diver.

== Diving career ==
Vitucci had a successful diving career at The Ohio State University, winning five NCAA diving titles in the 3-metre springboard from 1961 to 1963 and the 1-metre springboard in 1962 and 1963. He was also a Big 10 Conference Champion on the 1-metre in 1961 and the 3-metre in 1961 and 1963. Vitucci competed at the 1963 Pan American Games, placing fourth on the platform, and represented the United States in the men's 10 metre platform event at the 1964 Summer Olympics.

== Coaching career ==
After his competitive diving career, Vitucci joined Lincoln Electric in Cleveland, Ohio, where he worked in various management positions. He also dedicated time to coaching diving at several universities, including the University of Pennsylvania, Brandeis University, and the University of Louisville.
