= Francis Heydt =

American swimmer (1918–2008)

Francis Elmer Heydt
- Francis Heydt, Univ. of Michigan swim team
- Born: August 15, 1918; Wellington, Kansas, United States
- Died: November 25, 2008 (aged 90); Kansas City, Kansas, United States
- Education: University of Michigan
- Occupation: Clothing manufacturer
- Known for: NCAA champion, 150-yard backstroke, 1941; NCAA champion, 300-yard medley relay champion, 1940, 1941

Francis Elmer Heydt (August 15, 1918 – November 25, 2008) was a competitive swimmer who won three NCAA men's swimming championships, including the 150-yard backstroke event and two 300-yard medley relay championships as a member of the University of Michigan swimming team in 1940 and 1941. He later operated a successful clothing and export business that manufactured camouflage clothing to governments in the United States, Israel, and Libya. He was inducted into the University of Michigan Athletic Hall of Honor in 1988.

== Youth in Kansas ==
Heydt was born in Wellington, Kansas, and graduated from North High School in Wichita in 1936. In August 1935, Heydt set a new record at the Missouri Valley A.A.U. championship, swimming the 150-yard backstroke in 1:46.6. He enrolled at the University of Iowa in the fall of 1936.

== Championship swimmer ==
After swimming for Iowa in his sophomore year, Heydt transferred to the University of Michigan to work with legendary coach Matt Mann of the Michigan Wolverines swimming and diving team. After transferring, Heydt became eligible to compete for Michigan in February 1940, and won the Big Ten championship in the 150-yard backstroke in both 1940 and 1941. At the Big Ten Conference swim meet in early March 1941, Heydt set a new conference record for the 150-yard backstroke with a time of 1:41.6. At the NCAA tournament later that month, Heydt shaved nearly four second off his time, swimming the 150-yard backstroke in a time of 1:37.7, winning the individual championship. Two years later, another Michigan swimmer, Harry Holiday, broke Heydt's record, swimming the 150-yard backstroke with at time of 1:33.5. Heydt also participated in Michigan's NCAA 300-yard medley relay championships in 1940 and 1941. Heydt's performances also helped Michigan win the NCAA team championships in both 1940 and 1941.

=== Honors ===
Heydt was inducted into the University of Michigan Athletic Hall of Honor in 1988.

== Business career ==
After graduating from Michigan with a business degree, Heydt and his wife opened a clothing store, Lee's Men and Boys Store, in Mission, Kansas. In 1956, Heydt purchased a larger clothing store in Hutchinson, Kansas. He sold the store in 1959 and purchased a clothing factory in Oswego, Kansas, later opening a second factory in Commerce, Oklahoma. Operating as the Francis E. Heydt Company, Heydt later opened additional factories in Missouri, Kansas, Oklahoma, Arkansas and Tennessee. Heydt specialized in manufacturing camouflage clothing, flight suits, and other clothing for the United States and other countries, including Libya. He also sold airport runway sweepers, dog tag making machines, file cabinets, batteries, pipelines and airplanes.

In the 1980s, Heydt's company became involved in a dispute with the government over allegations that the company paid a government official a $10,000 gratuity in exchange for a contract to manufacture 56,800 night camouflage desert trousers. The government sought to disbar the company from conducting business with the government and refused to pay invoices totaling $175,000. In 1991, the company sued Secretary of Defense Dick Cheney in a suit that resulted in a published decision from the Tenth Circuit Court of Appeals. Francis E. Heydt Co. v. U.S. and Richard Cheney, 948 F.2d 672 (10th Cir. 1991).

In 1983, Heydt received further public attention when former CIA agent and explosives smuggler Edwin P. Wilson was charged with smuggling guns and 21 tons of C-4 plastic explosives to Libya. Wilson was also charged with taking out contracts for the murder of two prosecutors and six witnesses. The indictment stated that Heydt was on Wilson's "hit list" and that Wilson offered $500,000 for Heydt's murder. Heydt was identified as a former business partner of Wilson who Wilson claimed had cheated him out of $3.5 million.

== Family and death ==
Heydt met Virginia Lee Williams while he was working as a lifeguard at Mission Hills Country Club in Kansas City. The two were married on November 16, 1940, in Ann Arbor, Michigan.

Heydt was diagnosed with brain cancer in October 2008 and died in Kansas City, Kansas in November 2008.
