= Jim Henry (diver) =

American diver (born 1948)

Personal information
- Full name: James Edward Henry
- Born: September 4, 1948 (age 77) San Antonio, Texas, U.S.
Medal record
Men's diving
Representing the United States
Olympic Games
| Bronze medal – third place | 1968 Mexico City | 3 metre springboard |
Summer Universiade
| Silver medal – second place | 1970 Turin | 3 m springboard |
| Silver medal – second place | 1970 Turin | 10 m platform |

James Edward Henry (born September 4, 1948) is an American diver.

== Early life ==
Henry was born on September 4, 1948, in San Antonio, Texas, but later moved to the Dallas area where he dove for Hillcrest High school.

== At Indiana University ==
Henry was a diver at Indiana University from 1967 to 1970. While at the university Henry was the top diver for the 67-68, 68-69, and 69–70 years. Henry won four Big 10 championships, five NCAA titles (in multiple events), and ten AAU indoor and outdoor championships. Henry studied dentistry and joined the Alpha Iota Chapter of Theta Chi fraternity while at IU.

== 1968 Mexico City Olympics ==
In the 1968 Olympics that were held in Mexico City Henry won the bronze metal in the three-meter spring board dive. Henry was in line for the gold with three dives left. Henry ended up losing the gold to fellow American Bernard Wrightson and Henry ended up with the bronze in the event.

== Later life ==
In 1969 Henry was ranked as the number one springboard diver in the world. Henry ended up finishing his dentistry degree and practices dentistry in the Colorado Springs area. Henry lives in Colorado Springs, Colorado with his wife sue. Henry and his wife have two children and five grandchildren. Henry is also in the Texas diving hall-of-fame.
