= College Avenue Gymnasium =

Athletic facility in New Brunswick, New Jersey, US

Coordinates: 40.5033°N 74.4527°W

- The Barn
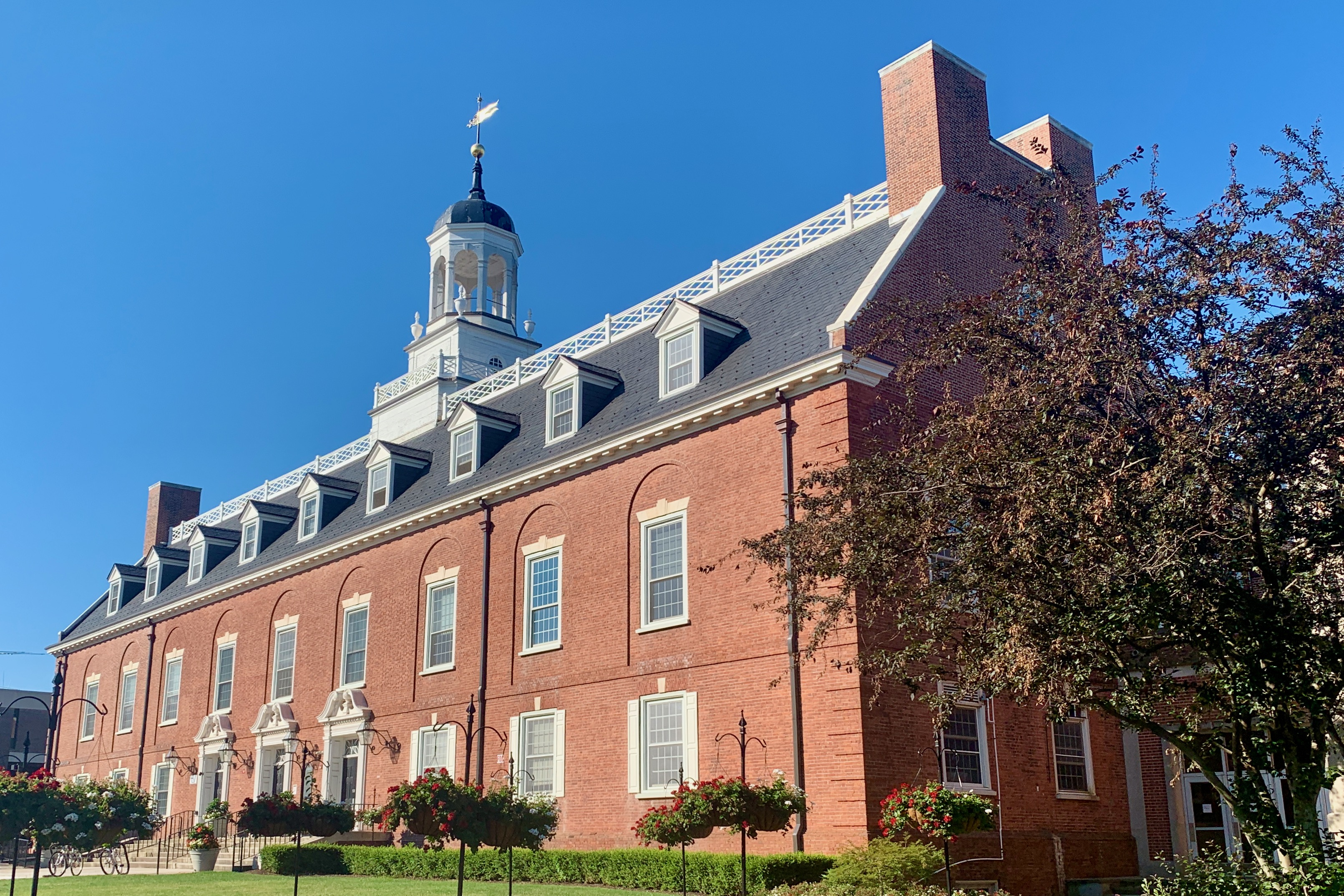
- College Avenue Gymnasium in 2020
- Interactive map of College Avenue Gymnasium
- Location: 130 College Avenue; New Brunswick, NJ 08901
- Owner: Rutgers University
- Operator: Rutgers University
- Capacity: 3,200 (approx.)

Construction
- Opened: 1932; 94 years ago

Tenants
- Rutgers College Rec Services; Rutgers Scarlet Knights (NCAA) teams: Volleyball; Wrestling (until 2019)

Website
- recreation.rutgers.edu/college-avenue

College Avenue Gymnasium (commonly known as "the Barn") is an athletic facility on the College Avenue Campus of Rutgers University in New Brunswick, New Jersey. The gymnasium is currently the home of Rutgers volleyball team, and also hosts gym facilities for students.

== History ==
A gymnasium was first built on the site in 1892, replacing College Field, where the first collegiate game of American football was played on November 6, 1869. The current structure was opened in 1932 after the Ballantine Gymnasium burned down two years prior.

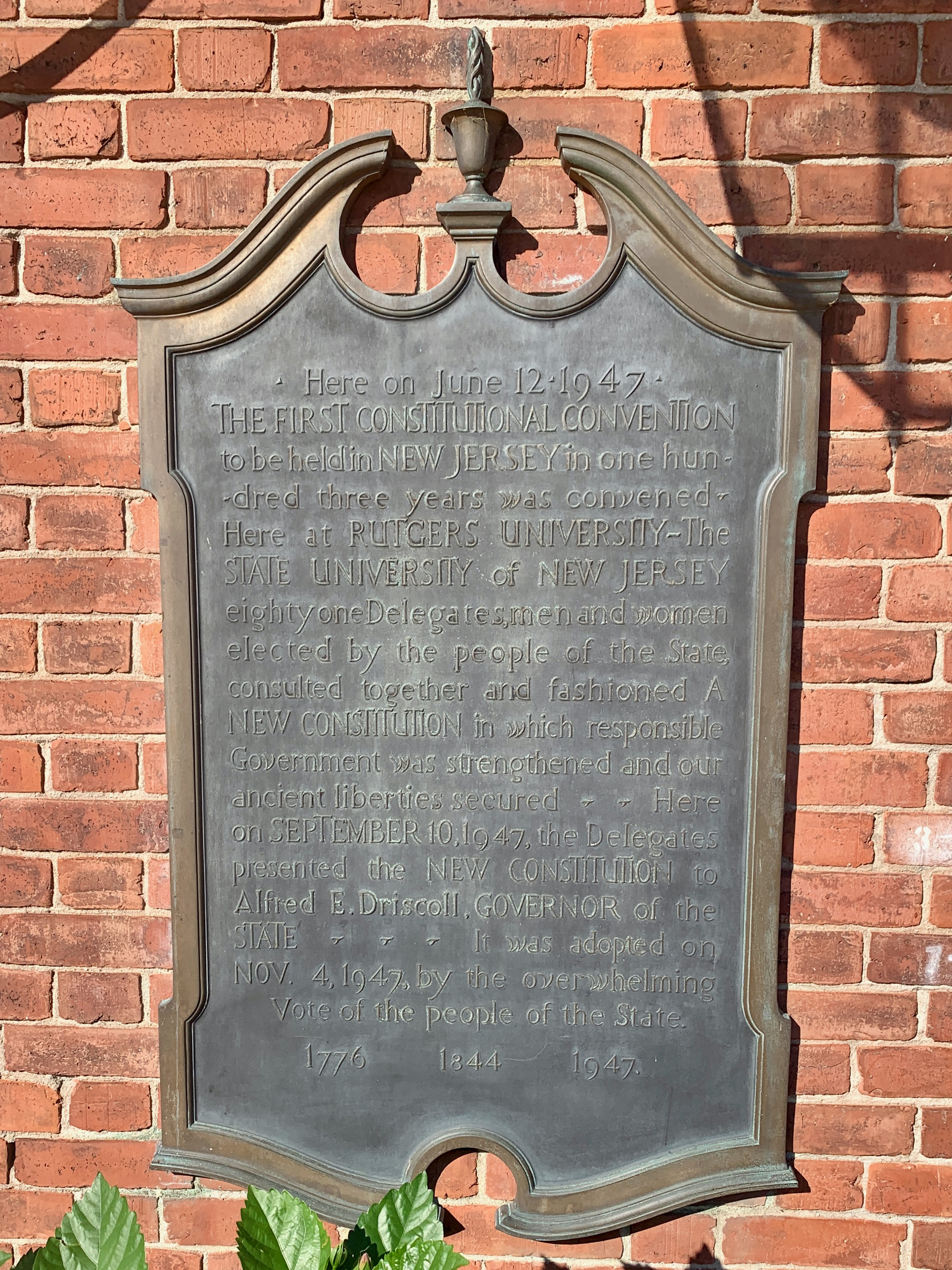
Plaque commemorating the constitutional convention

A constitutional convention, led by Rutgers President Robert Clarkson Clothier, was held at the gym in 1947 and resulted in the adoption of the current Constitution of New Jersey.

The basketball team reached its only NCAA Final Four in 1976, going undefeated until losing to the University of Michigan in the semifinal. Home games at the Barn were festive affairs, with the crowd yelling so loudly that paint chips fell from the ceiling. Plans were developed to build a bigger home court, resulting in the construction of the Rutgers Athletic Center across the Raritan River in Piscataway in time for the 1977–78 season, currently called Jersey Mike's Arena.

The Rutgers Wrestling team used it as a practice location and home arena, before moving to the RWJBarnabas Health Athletic Performance Center in September 2019.

Rutgers University Dance Marathon is held in the gymnasium since 2020 after being held there from 2001 to 2013 but then being moved to Louis Brown Athletic Center (RAC) due to growth.

== Amenities ==
Seating capacity has been approximately 3,200 throughout its existence, most of which consists of a balcony on three sides, elevated from court level, which gave the gym one of the most intimate settings in college basketball.

There is an annex attached to the side of the gym that sport courts for basketball, indoor soccer, and a variety of other sports. The Barn has a rock climbing wall and provides willing students with lessons, as well as a room for kickboxing and mixed martial arts. There is also a room with multiple Olympic weightlifting platforms. Both the kickboxing room and the Olympic weightlifting room are deemed "The Power Gym" and are located off of The Barn's main weight-room.
