= NCAA Division I men's swimming and diving championships =

- Association: NCAA
- Sport: Swimming and Diving
- Founded: 1924; 102 years ago
- Division: Division I
- Country: United States
- Most recent champion: Texas (17th title)
- Most titles: Texas (17)
- Broadcaster: ESPN
- Website: NCAA.com

The NCAA Division I men's swimming and diving championships (formerly the NCAA University Division swimming and diving championships) are contested at an annual swim meet hosted by the National Collegiate Athletic Association to determine the individual and team champions of men's collegiate swimming and diving among its Division I members in the United States. It has been held every year since 1924, except 2020.

The meets take place in a 25 yd pool, except for the 2000 and 2004 editions, which were swum in a 25 m pool.

Texas have been the most successful program, with 17 national titles.

== Events ==
=== Individual swimming events ===
- Freestyle events
  - 50-yard Freestyle (1925−present)
  - 100-yard Freestyle (1925−present)
  - 200-yard Freestyle (1963−present)
  - 500-yard Freestyle (1963−present)
  - 1,650-yard Freestyle (1963−present)
- Backstroke events
  - 100-yard Backstroke (1950−present)
  - 200-yard Backstroke (1951−present)
- Breaststroke events
  - 100-yard Breaststroke (1958−present)
  - 200-yard Breaststroke (1958−present)
- Butterfly events
  - 100-yard Butterfly (1950−present)
  - 200-yard Butterfly (1935−present)
- Medley events
  - 200-yard individual medley (1956−present)
  - 400-yard individual medley (1963−present)

=== Relay swimming events ===
- Freestyle relay events
  - 200-yard freestyle relay (1927−1930, 1989−present)
  - 400-yard freestyle relay (1931−present)
  - 800-yard freestyle relay (1966−present)
- Medley relay events
  - 200-yard medley relay (1989−present)
  - 400-yard medley relay (1957−present)

=== Diving events ===
- Diving events
  - One-meter diving (1924−present)
  - Three-meter diving (1931−present)
  - Platform diving (1990−present)

== Short-course events ==
=== Individual swimming events ===
- Freestyle events
  - 50-meter Freestyle (2000, 2004)
  - 100-meter Freestyle (1924, 2000, 2004)
  - 200-meter Freestyle (1924, 2000, 2004)
  - 400-meter Freestyle (1924, 2000, 2004)
  - 1,500-meter Freestyle (1924, 1932−1962, 2000, 2004)
- Backstroke events
  - 100-meter Backstroke (1924, 2000, 2004)
  - 200-meter Backstroke (2000, 2004)
- Breaststroke events
  - 100-meter Breaststroke (2000, 2004)
  - 200-meter Breaststroke (1924, 2000, 2004)
- Butterfly events
  - 100-meter Butterfly (2000, 2004)
  - 200-meter Butterfly (2000, 2004)
- Medley events
  - 200-meter individual medley (2000, 2004)
  - 400-meter individual medley (2000, 2004)

=== Relay swimming events ===
- Freestyle relay events
  - 200-meter freestyle relay (2000, 2004)
  - 400-meter freestyle relay (2000, 2004)
  - 800-meter freestyle relay (2000, 2004)
- Medley relay events
  - 200-meter medley relay (2000, 2004)
  - 400-meter medley relay (2000, 2004)

== Discontinued events ==
=== Individual swimming events ===
- Freestyle events
  - 220-yard Freestyle (1925–1962)
  - 440-yard Freestyle (1925–1962)
- Backstroke events
  - 150-yard Backstroke (1925–1950)
- Breaststroke events
  - 100-yard Breaststroke (1957)
  - 200-yard Breaststroke (1925–1934, 1955–1974)
- Medley events
  - 150-yard individual medley (1930, 1949–1955)

=== Relay swimming events ===
- Medley relay events
  - 300-yard medley relay (1927–1956)

== Results ==
- From inception in 1924 through 1936, three schools won all of the NCAA unofficial team championships, which were proclaimed in the newspapers of the time.

=== Pre-team championship (1924−1936) ===
NCAA Collegiate Swimming Championship Meets
Year	Site	Venue	Winner
1924; Details	Annapolis, Maryland	Scott Natatorium	Northwestern
1925; Details	Evanston, Illinois	Patten Gymnasium	Navy
1926; Details	Annapolis, Maryland	Scott Natatorium	Navy
1927; Details	Iowa City, Iowa	Field House Pool	Michigan
1928; Details	Philadelphia, Pennsylvania	Hutchinson Gymnasium	Michigan
1929; Details	St. Louis, Missouri	Francis Gymnasium	Northwestern
1930; Details	Cambridge, Massachusetts	Malkin Athletic Center	Northwestern
1931; Details	Chicago, Illinois	Lake Shore Athletic Club	Michigan
1932; Details	Ann Arbor, Michigan	Intramural Sports Building	Michigan
1933; Details	New Haven, Connecticut	Payne Whitney Gymnasium	Northwestern
1934; Details	Columbus, Ohio	Ohio State Natatorium	Michigan
1935; Details	Cambridge, Massachusetts	Malkin Athletic Center	Michigan
1936; Details	New Haven, Connecticut	Payne Whitney Gymnasium	Michigan

=== Team championship (1937−present) ===
NCAA Men's Swimming and Diving Championships
Year	Site	Venue	Team Championship			
Year	Site	Venue	Winner	Points	Runner-up	Points
1937; Details	Minneapolis, Minnesota	University of Minnesota Armory	Michigan	75	Ohio State	39
1938; Details	New Brunswick, New Jersey	College Avenue Gym	Michigan (2)	46	Ohio State	45
1939; Details	Ann Arbor, Michigan	Intramural Sports Building	Michigan (3)	65	Ohio State	58
1940; Details	New Haven, Connecticut	Kiphuth Pool	Michigan (4)	45	Yale	42
1941; Details	East Lansing, Michigan	Jenison Pool	Michigan (5)	61	Yale	58
1942; Details	Cambridge, Massachusetts	Indoor Athletic Building	Yale	71	Michigan	39
1943; Details	Columbus, Ohio	Ohio State Natatorium	Ohio State	81	Michigan	47
1944; Details	New Haven, Connecticut	Kiphuth Pool	Yale (2)	39	Michigan	38
1945; Details	Ann Arbor, Michigan	Intramural Sports Building	Ohio State (2)	56	Michigan	48
1946; Details	New Haven, Connecticut	Kiphuth Pool	Ohio State (3)	61	Michigan	37
1947; Details	Seattle, Washington	Pavilion Pool	Ohio State (4)	66	Michigan	39
1948; Details	Ann Arbor, Michigan	Intramural Sports Building	Michigan (6)	44	Ohio State	41
1949; Details	Chapel Hill, North Carolina	Bowman Gray Pool	Ohio State (5)	49	Iowa	35
1950; Details	Columbus, Ohio	Ohio State Natatorium	Ohio State (6)	64	Yale	43
1951; Details	Austin, Texas	Gregory Gymnasium Pool	Yale (3)	81	Michigan State	60
1952; Details	Princeton, New Jersey	Dillon Pool	Ohio State (7)	94	Yale	81
1953; Details	Columbus, Ohio	Ohio State Natatorium	Yale (4)	96½	Ohio State	73½
1954; Details	Syracuse, New York	Webster Pool	Ohio State (8)	94	Michigan	67
1955; Details	Oxford, Ohio	Billings Natatorium	Ohio State (9)	90	Michigan; Yale	51
1956; Details	New Haven, Connecticut	Kiphuth Pool	Ohio State (10)	68	Yale	54
1957; Details	Chapel Hill, North Carolina	Bowman Gray Pool	Michigan (7)	69	Yale	61
1958; Details	Ann Arbor, Michigan	Intramural Sports Building	Michigan (8)	72	Yale	63
1959; Details	Ithaca, New York	Teagle Pool	Michigan (9)	137½	Ohio State	44
1960; Details	University Park, Texas	Perkins Natatorium	USC	87	Michigan	73
1961; Details	Seattle	Pavilion Pool	Michigan (10)	85	USC	62
1962; Details	Columbus, Ohio	Ohio State Natatorium	Ohio State (11)	92	USC	46
1963; Details	Raleigh, North Carolina	Willis Casey Natatorium	USC (2)	81	Yale	77
1964; Details	New Haven, Connecticut	Kiphuth Pool	USC (3)	96	Indiana	91
1965; Details	Ames, Iowa	Beyer Hall Pool	USC (4)	285	Indiana	278½
1966; Details	Colorado Springs, Colorado	Cadet Gymnasium	USC (5)	302	Indiana	286
1967; Details	East Lansing, Michigan	McCaffree Pool	Stanford	275	USC	260
1968; Details	Hanover, New Hampshire	Karl Michael Pool	Indiana	346	Yale	253
1969; Details	Bloomington, Indiana	Royer Pool	Indiana (2)	427	USC	306
1970; Details	Salt Lake City, Utah	Ute Natatorium	Indiana (3)	332	USC	235
1971; Details	Ames, Iowa	Beyer Hall Pool	Indiana (4)	351	USC	260
1972; Details	West Point, New York	Crandall Pool	Indiana (5)	390	USC	371
1973; Details	Knoxville, Tennessee	UT Student Aquatic Center	Indiana (6)	358	Tennessee	294
1974; Details	Long Beach, California	Belmont Plaza Pool	USC (6)	339	Indiana	338
1975; Details	Cleveland, Ohio	CSU Natatorium	USC (7)	344	Indiana	274
1976; Details	Providence, Rhode Island	Smith Swimming Center	USC (8)	398	Tennessee	237
1977; Details	Cleveland	CSU Natatorium	USC (9)	385	Alabama	204
1978; Details	Long Beach, California	Belmont Plaza Pool	Tennessee	307	Auburn	185
1979; Details	Cleveland, Ohio	CSU Natatorium	California	287	USC	227
1980; Details	Cambridge, Massachusetts	Blodgett Pool	California (2)	234	Texas	220
1981; Details	Austin, Texas	Texas Swimming Center	Texas	259	UCLA	189
1982; Details	Brown Deer, Wisconsin	Schroeder Swimming Center	UCLA	219	Texas	210
1983; Details	Indianapolis	Indiana University Natatorium	Florida	238	SMU	227
1984; Details	Cleveland	CSU Natatorium	Florida (2)	287½	Texas	277
1985; Details	Austin, Texas	Texas Swimming Center	Stanford (2)	403½	Florida	329
1986; Details	Indianapolis	Indiana University Natatorium	Stanford (3)	404	California	335
1987; Details	Austin, Texas	Texas Swimming Center	Stanford (4)	374	USC	296
1988; Details	Indianapolis	Indiana University Natatorium	Texas (2)	424	USC	369½
1989; Details	Indianapolis	Indiana University Natatorium	Texas (3)	424	Stanford	396
1990; Details	Indianapolis	Indiana University Natatorium	Texas (4)	506	USC	423
1991; Details	Austin, Texas	Texas Swimming Center	Texas (5)	476	Stanford	420
1992; Details	Indianapolis	Indiana University Natatorium	Stanford (5)	632	Texas	356
1993; Details	Indianapolis	Indiana University Natatorium	Stanford (6)	520½	Michigan	396
1994; Details	Minneapolis	University Aquatic Center	Stanford (7)	566½	Texas	445
1995; Details	Indianapolis	Indiana University Natatorium	Michigan (11)	561	Stanford	475
1996; Details	Austin, Texas	Texas Swimming Center	Texas (6)	479	Auburn	443½
1997; Details	Minneapolis	University Aquatic Center	Auburn	496½	Stanford	340
1998; Details	Auburn, Alabama	James E. Martin Aquatics Center	Stanford (8)	599	Auburn	394½
1999; Details	Indianapolis	Indiana University Natatorium	Auburn (2)	467½	Stanford	414½
2000; Details	Minneapolis	University Aquatic Center	Texas (7)	538	Auburn	385
2001; Details	College Station, Texas	Student Recreation Center Natatorium	Texas (8)	597½	Stanford	457½
2002; Details	Athens, Georgia	Gabrielsen Natatorium	Texas (9)	512	Stanford	501
2003; Details	Austin, Texas	Texas Swimming Center	Auburn (3)	609½	Texas	413
2004; Details	East Meadow, New York	Nassau County Aquatic Center	Auburn (4)	634	Stanford	377½
2005; Details	Minneapolis	University Aquatic Center	Auburn (5)	491	Stanford	414
2006; Details	Atlanta	Georgia Tech Aquatic Center	Auburn (6)	480	Arizona	440½
2007; Details	Minneapolis	Jean K. Freeman Aquatic Center	Auburn (7)	566	Stanford	397
2008; Details	Federal Way, Washington	Weyerhaeuser Aquatic Center	Arizona	500½	Texas	406
2009; Details	College Station, Texas	Student Recreation Center Natatorium	Auburn (8)	526	Texas	487
2010; Details	Columbus, Ohio	McCorkle Aquatic Pavilion	Texas (10)	500	California	469½
2011; Details	Minneapolis	Jean K. Freeman Aquatic Center	California (3)	493	Texas	470½
2012; Details	Federal Way, Washington	Weyerhaeuser Aquatic Center	California (4)	535½	Texas	491
2013; Details	Indianapolis	Indiana University Natatorium	Michigan (12)	480	California	406½
2014; Details	Austin, Texas	Texas Swimming Center	California (5)	468½	Texas	417½
2015; Details	Iowa City, Iowa	Iowa Natatorium	Texas (11)	528	California	399
2016; Details	Atlanta	Georgia Tech Aquatic Center	Texas (12)	541½	California	351
2017; Details	Indianapolis	Indiana University Natatorium	Texas (13)	542	California	349
2018; Details	Minneapolis	Jean K. Freeman Aquatic Center	Texas (14)	449	California	437.5
2019; Details	Austin, Texas	Texas Swimming Center	California	560	Texas	475
2020	Indianapolis	Indiana University Natatorium	Cancelled due to the COVID-19 pandemic.			
2021; Details	Greensboro, NC	Greensboro Aquatic Center	Texas (15)	595	California	568
2022; Details	Atlanta	Georgia Tech Aquatic Center	California (6)	487.5	Texas	436.5
2023; Details	Minneapolis	Jean K. Freeman Aquatic Center	California (7)	482	Arizona State	430
2024; Details	Indianapolis	Indiana University Natatorium	Arizona State	523.5	California	444.5
2025; Details	Federal Way	Weyerhaeuser King County Aquatic Center	Texas (16)	490	California	471
2026; Details	Atlanta	Georgia Tech Aquatic Center	Texas (17)	445.50	Florida	416

== Champions ==
=== Team titles ===
National championships by school: 17, 12, 11, 9, 8, 6, 4, 2, 1

Team	Number	Years won (official)
Texas	17	1981, 1988, 1989, 1990, 1991, 1996, 2000, 2001, 2002, 2010, 2015, 2016, 2017, 2018, 2021, 2025, 2026
Michigan	12	1937, 1938, 1939, 1940, 1941, 1948, 1957, 1958, 1959, 1961, 1995, 2013
Ohio State	11	1943, 1945, 1946, 1947, 1949, 1950, 1952, 1954, 1955, 1956, 1962
USC	9	1960, 1963, 1964, 1965, 1966, 1974, 1975, 1976, 1977
Stanford	8	1967, 1985, 1986, 1987, 1992, 1993, 1994, 1998
Auburn	8	1997, 1999, 2003, 2004, 2005, 2006, 2007, 2009
California	8	1979, 1980, 2011, 2012, 2014, 2019, 2022, 2023
Indiana	6	1968, 1969, 1970, 1971, 1972, 1973
Yale	4	1942, 1944, 1951, 1953
Florida	2	1983, 1984
Tennessee	1	1978
UCLA	1	1982
Arizona	1	2008
Arizona State	1	2024

== Venues ==
Natatorium	City	University	Events	Years
Indiana University Natatorium	Indianapolis	IU Indianapolis	12	1983, 1986, 1988, 1989, 1990, 1992, 1993, 1995, 1999, 2013, 2017, 2024
Texas Swimming Center	Austin, Texas	University of Texas	8	1981, 1985, 1987, 1991, 1996, 2003, 2014, 2019
University Aquatic Center	Minneapolis	University of Minnesota	8	1994, 1997, 2000, 2005, 2007, 2011, 2018, 2023
Payne Whitney Gymnasium	New Haven, Connecticut	Yale University	7	1933, 1935, 1940, 1944, 1946, 1956, 1964
Ohio State Natatorium	Columbus, Ohio	Ohio State University	5	1934, 1943, 1950, 1953, 1962
Intramural Sports Building	Ann Arbor, Michigan	University of Michigan	5	1932, 1939, 1945, 1948, 1958
Robert F. Busbey Natatorium	Cleveland, Ohio	Cleveland State University	4	1975, 1977, 1979, 1984
Georgia Tech Aquatic Center	Atlanta	Georgia Institute of Technology	4	2006, 2016, 2022, 2026
Malkin Athletic Center	Cambridge, Massachusetts	Harvard University	3	1930, 1935, 1942
Weyerhaeuser King County Aquatic Center	Federal Way, Washington	None	3	2008, 2012, 2025
Student Recreation Center Natatorium	College Station, Texas	Texas A&M University	2	2001, 2009
Belmont Plaza Pool	Long Beach, California	California State University, Long Beach	2	1974, 1978
Beyer Hall Pool	Ames, Iowa	Iowa State University	2	1965, 1971
Pavilion Pool	Seattle, Washington	University of Washington	2	1947, 1961
Bowman Gray Pool	Chapel Hill, North Carolina	University of North Carolina	2	1949, 1957
Patten Gymnasium	Evanston, Illinois	Northwestern University	2	1925, 1931
Scott Natatorium	Annapolis, Maryland	United States Naval Academy	2	1924, 1926
Greensboro Aquatic Center	Greensboro, North Carolina	None	1	2021
Iowa Natatorium	Iowa City, Iowa	University of Iowa	1	2015
McCorkle Aquatic Pavilion	Columbus, Ohio	Ohio State University	1	2010
Nassau County Aquatic Center	East Meadow, New York	None	1	2004
Gabrielsen Natatorium	Athens, Georgia	University of Georgia	1	2002
James E. Martin Aquatics Center	Auburn, Alabama	Auburn University	1	1998
Schroeder Swimming Center	Brown Deer, Wisconsin	None	1	1982
Blodgett Pool	Cambridge, Massachusetts	Harvard University	1	1980
Smith Swimming Center	Providence, Rhode Island	Brown University	1	1976
UT Student Aquatic Center	Knoxville, Tennessee	University of Tennessee	1	1973
Crandall Pool	West Point, New York	United States Military Academy	1	1972
Ute Natatorium	Salt Lake City	University of Utah	1	1970
Royer Pool	Bloomington, Indiana	Indiana University	1	1969
Karl Michael Pool	Hanover, New Hampshire	Dartmouth College	1	1968
McCaffree Pool	East Lansing, Michigan	Michigan State University	1	1967
Cadet Gymnasium	Colorado Springs, Colorado	United States Air Force Academy	1	1966
Willis Casey Natatorium	Raleigh, North Carolina	North Carolina State University	1	1963
Perkins Natatorium	University Park, Texas	Southern Methodist University	1	1960
Teagle Pool	Ithaca, New York	Cornell University	1	1959
Billings Natatorium	Oxford, Ohio	Miami University	1	1955
Webster Pool	Syracuse, New York	Syracuse University	1	1954
Dillon Pool	Princeton, New Jersey	Princeton University	1	1952
Gregory Gymnasium	Austin, Texas	University of Texas	1	1951
Jenison Pool	East Lansing, Michigan	Michigan State College	1	1941
College Avenue Gymnasium	New Brunswick, New Jersey	Rutgers University	1	1938
University of Minnesota Armory	Minneapolis	University of Minnesota	1	1937
Francis Gymnasium	St. Louis	Washington University in St. Louis	1	1929
Hutchinson Gymnasium	Philadelphia	University of Pennsylvania	1	1928
Field House Pool	Iowa City, Iowa	University of Iowa	1	1927

== Meet records ==
Event	Time		Name	Club	Date	Location	Ref
50 yd freestyle	17.63	NR	Caeleb Dressel	Florida	March 22, 2018	Minneapolis, Minnesota	
100 yd freestyle	39.83	h	Jordan Crooks	Cayman Islands; Tennessee	March 29, 2025	Federal Way, Washington	
200 yd freestyle	1:28.33	NR	Luke Hobson	Texas	March 28, 2025	Federal Way, Washington	
500 yd freestyle	4:02.31		Léon Marchand	France; ASU	March 28, 2024	Indianapolis, Indiana	
1650 yd freestyle	14:10.03		Ahmed Jaouadi	Tunisia; Florida	March 25, 2026	Atlanta, Georgia	
100 yd backstroke	42.61		Hubert Kos	Hungary; Texas	March 27, 2026	Atlanta, Georgia	
200 yd backstroke	1:34.13		Hubert Kos	Hungary; Texas	March 28, 2026	Atlanta, Georgia	
100 yd breaststroke	49.53		Liam Bell	California	March 29, 2024	Indianapolis, Indiana	
200 yd breaststroke	1:46.35		Léon Marchand	France; ASU	March 30, 2024	Indianapolis, Indiana	
100 yd butterfly	42.49		Joshua Liendo	Canada; Florida	March 26, 2026	Atlanta, Georgia	
200 yd butterfly	1:36.43	NR	Gianluca Urlando	Georgia	March 29, 2025	Federal Way, Washington	
200 yd individual medley	1:36.34		Léon Marchand	France; ASU	March 23, 2023	Minneapolis, Minnesota	
400 yd individual medley	3:28.82		Léon Marchand	France; ASU	March 24, 2023	Minneapolis, Minnesota	
200 yd freestyle relay	1:12.46		(Luxembourg) Remi Fabiani (18.59); Adam Chaney (18.12); (Canada) Ilya Kharun (17.76); Jonny Kulow (17.99)	ASU	March 26, 2026	Atlanta, Georgia	
400 yd freestyle relay	2:42.30		(Brazil) Guilherme Caribé (40.57); (The Bahamas) Lamar Taylor (41.02); (Trinidad and Tobago) Nikoli Blackman (41.35); (Cayman Islands) Jordan Crooks (39.36)	Tennessee	March 29, 2025	Federal Way, Washington	
800 yd freestyle relay	5:59.75		Jack Alexy (1:30.02); Gabriel Jett (1:29.16); Destin Lasco (1:29.10); (Belgium) Lucas Henveaux (1:31.47)	California	March 26, 2025	Federal Way, Washington	
200 yd medley relay	1:20.07		Adam Chaney (20.35); Andy Dobrzanski (23.04); (Canada) Ilya Kharun (18.70); Jonny Kulow (17.98)	Arizona State	March 25, 2026	Atlanta, Georgia	
400 yd medley relay	2:56.10		(United Kingdom) Jonny Marshall (43.87); Julian Smith (48.85); (Canada) Joshua Liendo (42.46); (United Kingdom) Alexander Painter (40.92)	Florida	March 28, 2025	Federal Way, Washington	
1 m Springboard	473.75		Kristian Ipsen	Stanford	March 28, 2013	Indianapolis, Indiana	
3 m Springboard	529.10		Samuel Dorman	Miami	March 27, 2015	Iowa City, Iowa	
Platform	548.90		Nick McCrory	Duke	March 26, 2011	Minneapolis, Minnesota	

Legend: # – Record awaiting ratification by NCAA; NR – American record;
Records not set in finals: p – preliminary; sf – semifinal; r – relay 1st leg; rh – relay heat 1st leg; b – B final; † – en route to final mark; tt – time trial;

== See also ==
- NCAA men's swimming and diving championships (Division II, Division III)
- NCAA women's swimming and diving championships (Division I, Division II, Division III)
- NAIA men's swimming and diving championships
- List of college swimming and diving teams
