= Villanova Wildcats swimming and diving =

- Head coach: Rick Simpson
- Conference: Big East
- Location: Villanova, Pennsylvania, US
- Home pool: Pavilion Swim Center
- Colors: Navy blue and white

Men's Conference Champions
- 3 (1981, 1983, 1993)

Women's Conference Champions
- 18 (1992, 1993, 1994, 1995, 1996, 2014, 2015, 2016, 2017, 2018, 2019, 2020, 2021, 2022, 2023, 2024, 2025, 2026)

Villanova Wildcats Swimming and Diving is Villanova University's varsity swimming and diving team. The Wildcats compete in the NCAA's Big East Conference. Currently, the Wildcats are coached by Rick Simpson, assisted by Laura McGlaughlin, Todd Michael is the team's diving coach.

== Conference achievements ==
Conference Championships
Women	1992	1993	1994	1995	1996	2014	2015	2016	2017	2018	2019	2020	2021	2022	2023	2024	2025	2026
Men	1981	1983	1993															

== Notable alumni ==
- 2000 Olympian for the United States, Maddy Crippen
- 2008 Olympian for Puerto Rico, Kristina Lennox-Silva
- 2020 Olympian for the United States, Summer Rappaport
