= Patten Gymnasium =

Gymnasium in Evanston, Illinois, U.S.

- Patterson
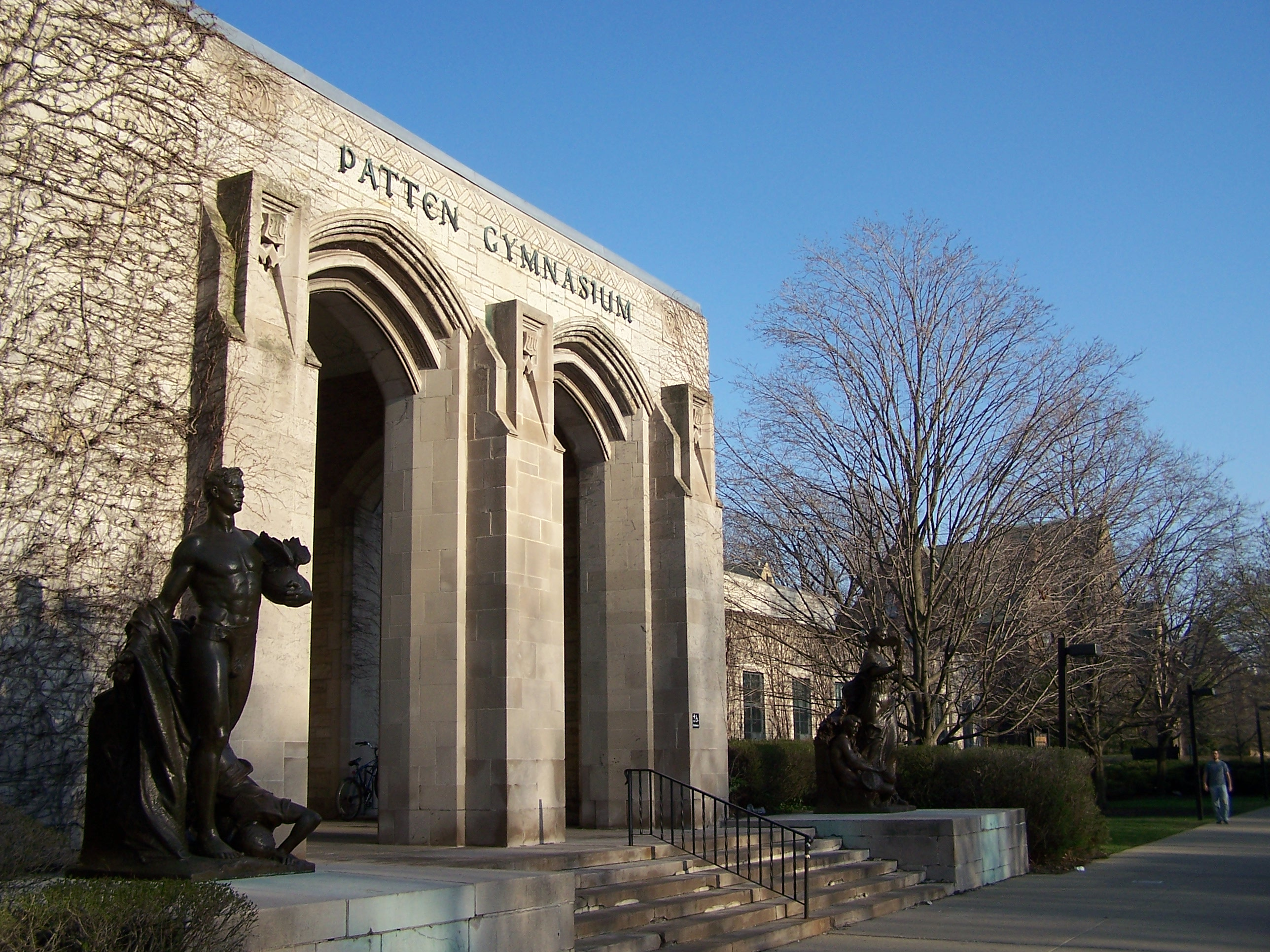
- Patten Gymnasium in 2008
- Interactive map of Patten Gymnasium
- Location: 2407 Sheridan Rd., Evanston, Illinois, U.S. 60208
- Coordinates: 42.061401°N 87.676948°W
- Owner: Northwestern University
- Operator: Northwestern University Department of Athletics and Recreation

Construction
- Opened: 1940

Tenants
- Northwestern Wildcats (NCAA); Men's basketball (1940–1952); Women's fencing (1976–present)

Patten Gymnasium is the name of two multi-purpose gymnasiums (one past and one present) in Evanston, Illinois, United States, on the campus of Northwestern University. The original building, designed by George Washington Maher, opened in 1909 and was home to the Northwestern Wildcats men's basketball team until 1940, when it was demolished to make room for the construction of the Technological Institute. The current Patten Gymnasium opened in 1940 and hosted the men's basketball team for 12 years before Welsh-Ryan Arena opened in 1952. The ivy-lined building has the doors and statues from the old gym. It currently is the home to the women's fencing team, intramural sports program and also has offices and locker rooms for the women's lacrosse, field hockey, and men's and women's soccer teams. It is named for James A. Patten, former Evanston mayor, philanthropist and NU board of trustees president.

In 1999, the swimming pool area, which had been unused since 1987, was renovated and transformed into the Gleacher Golf Center. At the time that it opened, the Gleacher Center was the only facility of its kind in collegiate golf, featuring a 2,000-square-foot (190 m^{2}) pitching and putting green with an adjacent sand trap.

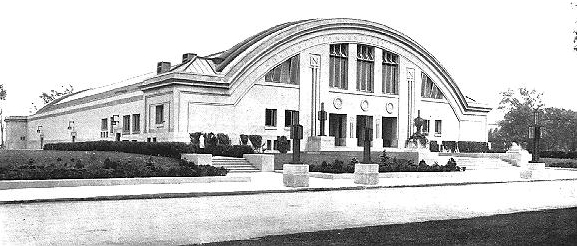
Original Patten Gymnasium in 1908, demolished in 1940

The original Patten Gymnasium, which had seating for 1,000 people, hosted the first NCAA Men's Division I Basketball Championship game in 1939.

The sculptures "Physical Development" and "Intellectual Development" by the artist Hermon Atkins MacNeil (1866–1947), affectionately nicknamed "Pat and Jim" (contractions of "Patten" and "gymnasium") and also known as "The Athlete and the Scholar", which had been exhibited in front of the original Patten Gymnasium starting in 1916, are now placed as sentinels at the sides of the successor gymnasium's front entrance.

Preceded by first arena	NCAA Men's Division I Basketball Tournament; Finals Venue; 1939	Succeeded by Municipal Auditorium
