= Northwestern Wildcats swimming and diving =

- Founded: 1909 (men's swimming); 1973 (women's swimming and diving)
- Conference: Big Ten Conference
- Location: Evanston, Illinois, US
- Home pool: Norris Aquatics Center
- Nickname: Wildcats
- Colors: Purple and white

Men's NCAA Champions
- 1924, 1929, 1930, 1933

Men's Conference Champions
- 10 championships

The Northwestern Wildcats swimming and diving teams represent Northwestern University in the National Collegiate Athletic Association (NCAA) Division I Swimming and Diving Championships.

== History ==
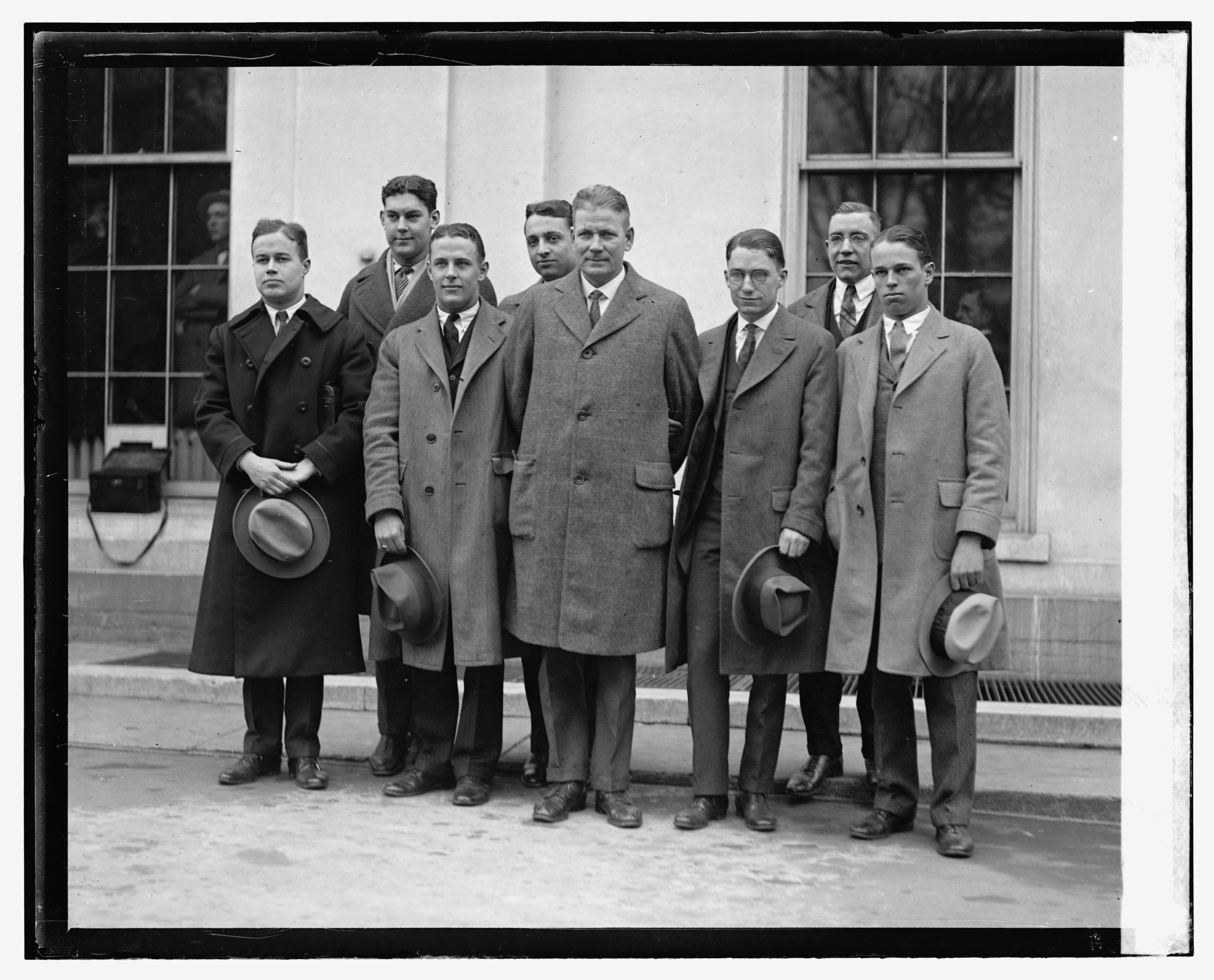
Members of the 1924 team

1927 team photograph

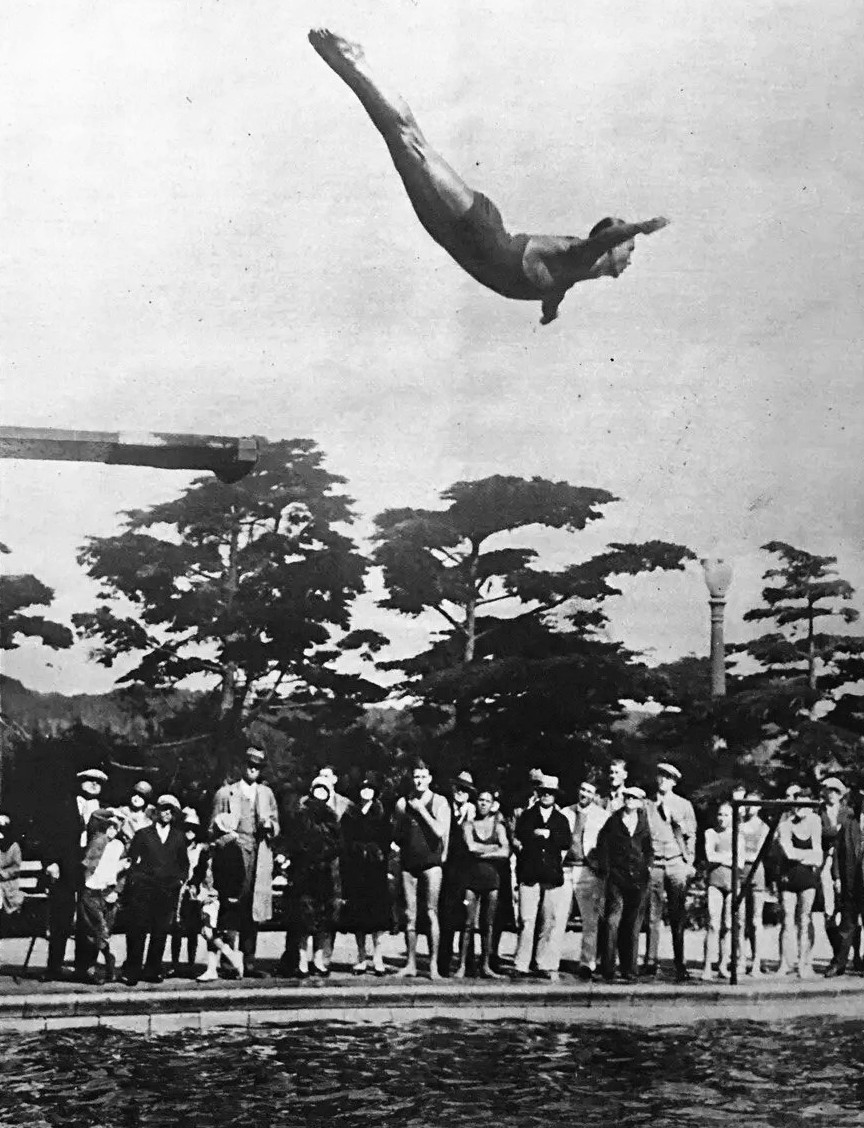
Walter Colbath performs a dive while competing for the diving team in 1928

Northwestern's men's swimming program was founded in 1909. The men's program has competed in the Big Ten Conference ever since the conference began sponsoring swimming in 1911. The university's varsity women's swimming and diving program was inaugurated in 1973.

In the NCAA Men's Swimming and Diving Championships held from 1924 through 1936, no team points were officially awarded. Northwestern won four unofficial national team championships during these years (1924, 1929, 1930, and 1933), which were proclaimed in the newspapers of the time, second only to Michigan's seven.

Northwestern Swimming and Diving has earned tremendous success over time. Three-time All-American Olivia Rosendahl won the NCAA Women's Platform Diving championship in both 2017 and 2018, and the Wildcats have been represented in each of the last three Summer Olympic Games, most recently by swimmers Valerie Gruest-Slowing and Jordan Wilimovsky in Rio in 2016. In the summer before his senior season, Wilimovsky became the first American to compete in both indoor and outdoor swimming events in the same Olympics. In 2015, Wilimovsky became the world champion in 10 km water race. Matt Grevers, a Northwestern alum, won two gold medals (100-meter backstroke, 400-meter medley relay) and a silver medal (400-meter freestyle relay) at the 2012 London Olympic Games. At the 1924 Paris Olympic Games, four Northwestern alums won gold medals- Ralph Breyer (4 x 200-meter freestyle relay), Sybil Bauer (100-meter backstroke), Richard Howell (4 x 200-meter freestyle relay) and Robert "Bob" Skelton (200-meter breaststroke). At the Stockholm 1912 Olympic Games, Northwestern alum, Kenneth Huszagh, won a silver medal (4 x 200-meter freestyle relay) and a bronze medal (100-meter freestyle). During the Melbourne 1956 Olympic Games, Northwestern alum, Nancy Simons Peterson won a silver medal in the 4 x 100-meter freestyle relay event. At the Los Angeles 1932 Olympic Games, Northwestern alum, Albert Schwartz won a bronze medal in the 100-meter freestyle event.

In June 2020, Northwestern Athletics elevated Katie Robinson to Director of Swimming and Diving, making her the second female to hold the position overseeing both men's and women's programs in the Power-5 conferences.

== Venues ==
=== Former pool at Patten Gymnasium ===
The swimming team's first venue was a pool located which opened in 1909 inside of the original Patten Gymnasium.

The pool was the venue of the Big Ten Conference championship meet from 1913 to 1920. The program hosted the NCAA Swimming and Diving Championships at its pool in 1925. It was also considered to be the host program of the 1931 championships.

=== Norris Aquatics Center ===
The program's current home venue is the Norris Aquatics Center, located inside of the Henry Crown Sports Pavilion. It is the location of the team's home meets and its training. The center, named for Dellora A. and Lester J. Norris, features a 750,000-gallon, 50-meter-by-25-yard pool with movable walls that run on a track system, enabling the pool to be custom-fitted. The facility also includes a heat recycling system, an electronic scoreboard, and seating for 800 spectators. It opened in 1987, and was renovated in 2012.
