= Dartmouth Big Green swimming and diving =

- Head coach: Milana Socha, Chris Hamilton
- Conference: Ivy League
- Location: Hanover, New Hampshire, US
- Home pool: Karl Michael Pool
- Nickname: Big Green

Dartmouth Swimming and Diving, which began in 1920, is one of the oldest college swim programs in the United States. The team competes for Dartmouth College in the Ivy League. The team begins training in mid September all the way until the end of March, ending the season with the Ivy League Championships, also known as "Ivies". The team practices 9 times a week and has weekly competitions throughout the season. The team trains and also hosts competitions at the Dartmouth College Aquatic Facilities, swimming in the Karl Michael Pool and the Spaulding Pool. They also host an annual invite at the Upper Valley Aquatic Center in nearby White River Junction VT.

Sometime in 2002, as a result of economic/financial troubles, Dartmouth College made several budget cuts which involved disbanding the men and women's swim team. In response, the team, as well as many others, rallied to stop the team from getting cut, one student even putting the team up on eBay in an effort to gain attention and money to save the team. After successfully lobbying and fundraising for the team by students, alumni, and fans, both teams were reinstated under the John C. Glover Fund for the Support of Swimming and Diving. The fund was named after one of the greatest Dartmouth swimmers of all time, John C. Glover, who was an all American Swimmer in the class of 1955 that died while training for the Olympics at Yale University in 1956.

The team was again cut as a varsity sport on July 9, 2020, along with the Men's and Women's Golf teams and Men's Lightweight Crew under the pretense of budgetary concerns. Funding was also cut for the Hanover Country Club indefinitely, although the grounds will be maintained for the use of the varsity Cross-Country team. Despite telling student-athletes and the fifteen coaches and staff members who were losing their jobs that this move was a cost-cutting measure, Dartmouth also made clear in a list of FAQs that no amount of pledges or donations from alumni would convince the administration to consider re-establishing the teams at the varsity level. Both teams were again reinstated on January 29 due to a threatened Title IX lawsuit.
