= Princeton Tigers swimming and diving =

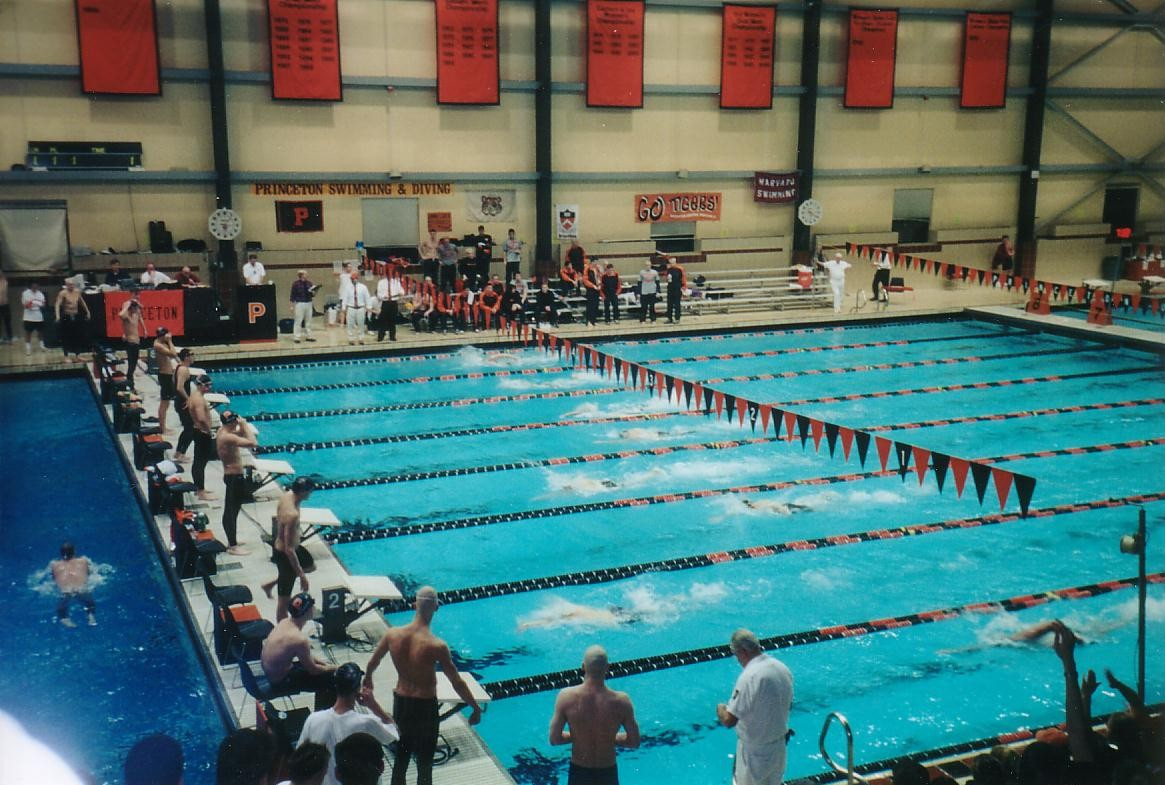
DeNunzio Pool, home of Princeton's swimming and diving teams

PUCSDT is an acronym for Princeton University Competitive Swimming and Diving Team. PUCSDT includes both the Princeton University Varsity Men's and Women's Swimming and Diving teams. The men have won the Ivy League Swimming and Diving championships from 2009-2013 and 2015-2016. Their home pool is Princeton's Denunzio Pool.

== See also ==
- List of college swimming and diving teams
