= Michigan Wolverines swimming and diving =

Swimming and diving team of the University of Michigan

- Founded: 1921 (men's); 1974 (women's)
- Head coach: Matt Bowe
- Conference: Big Ten Conference
- Location: Ann Arbor, Michigan, US
- Home pool: Canham Natatorium
- Nickname: Wolverines
- Colors: Maize and blue

Men's NCAA Champions
- 1937, 1938, 1939, 1940, 1941, 1948, 1957, 1958, 1959, 1961, 1995, 2013

Men's unofficial NCAA Champions
- 1927, 1928, 1931, 1932, 1934, 1935, 1936

Men's Conference Champions
- 1927, 1928, 1929, 1931, 1932, 1933, 1934, 1935, 1937, 1939, 1940, 1941, 1942, 1944, 1945, 1948, 1958, 1959, 1960, 1986, 1987, 1988, 1989, 1990, 1991, 1992, 1993, 1994, 1995, 1997, 2000, 2003, 2008, 2009, 2011, 2012, 2013, 2014, 2015, 2016, 2020, 2021

Women's Conference Champions
- 1987, 1988, 1989, 1990, 1991, 1992, 1993, 1994, 1995, 1996, 1997, 1998, 2001, 2004, 2016, 2017, 2018, 2026

The Michigan Wolverines swimming and diving teams represent the University of Michigan in the National Collegiate Athletic Association (NCAA) Division I Swimming and Diving Championships. The men's and women's teams, which had been coached separately, were combined in August 2012 by the University of Michigan Athletic Department.

The program has won 12 NCAA Championships, the second-most in history, as well as 58 Big Ten Championships. It has produced 399 All-Americans, and 107 Olympians have been affiliated with the program.

== Men's swimming and diving ==
=== History ===
The University of Michigan Men's Swimming and Diving team has a rich tradition of producing quality swimmers and being one of the nation's top programs. Men's swimming and diving has been a varsity sport at Michigan since 1921. With 19 total national championships — 12 official NCAA championships and seven unofficial NCAA national championships — the Michigan men's swimming and diving team has won more national championships than any other varsity sport in the history of the university. In addition, Michigan holds 42 Big Ten Titles in its history with its most recent title coming in the 2020–21 season. The team has won more Big Ten titles than any other program. Michigan has enjoyed great success as of late, finishing as a top-10 team in the NCAA's nine out of the last ten seasons, with its best finish coming in the 2012–13 season, in which they won the national championship. Michigan's total of 19 national championships in Swimming and Diving is the most of any team in history.

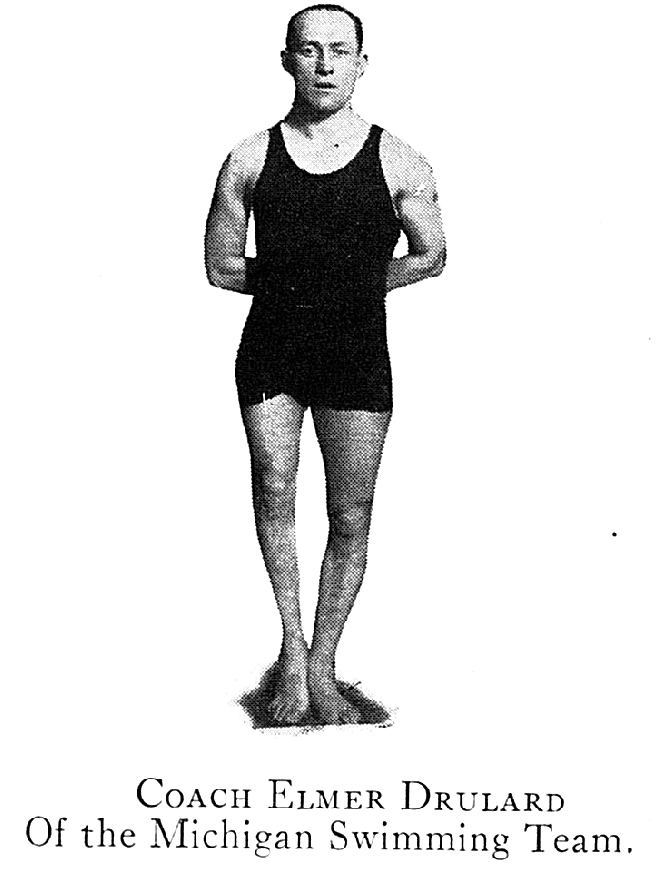
Coach Drulard founded the Michigan swim team in 1920

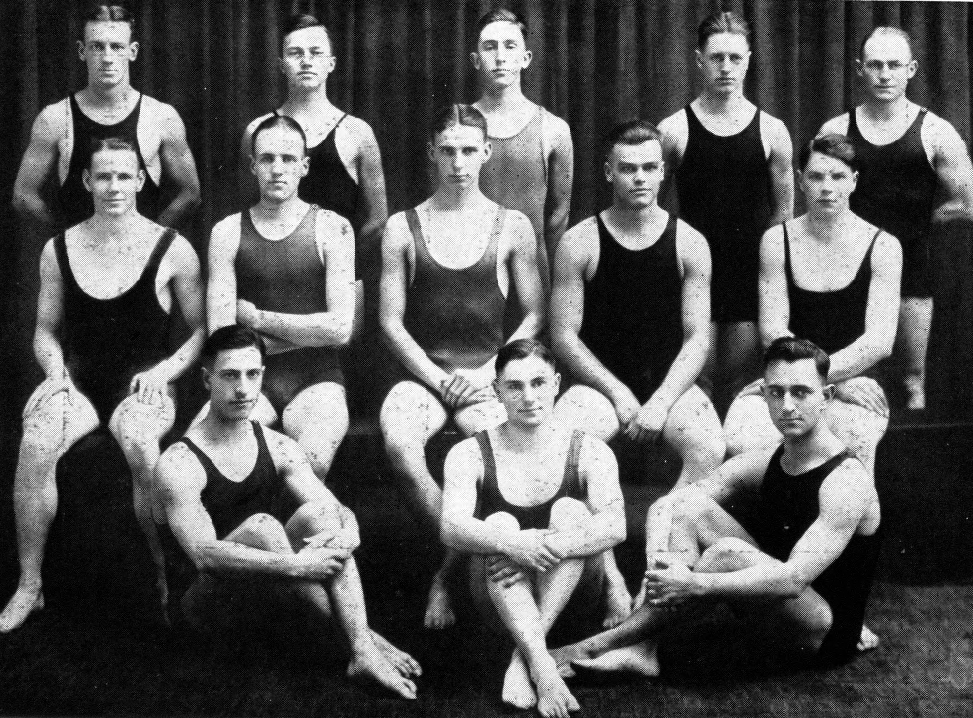
1920 "Informal Varsity Swim Team"

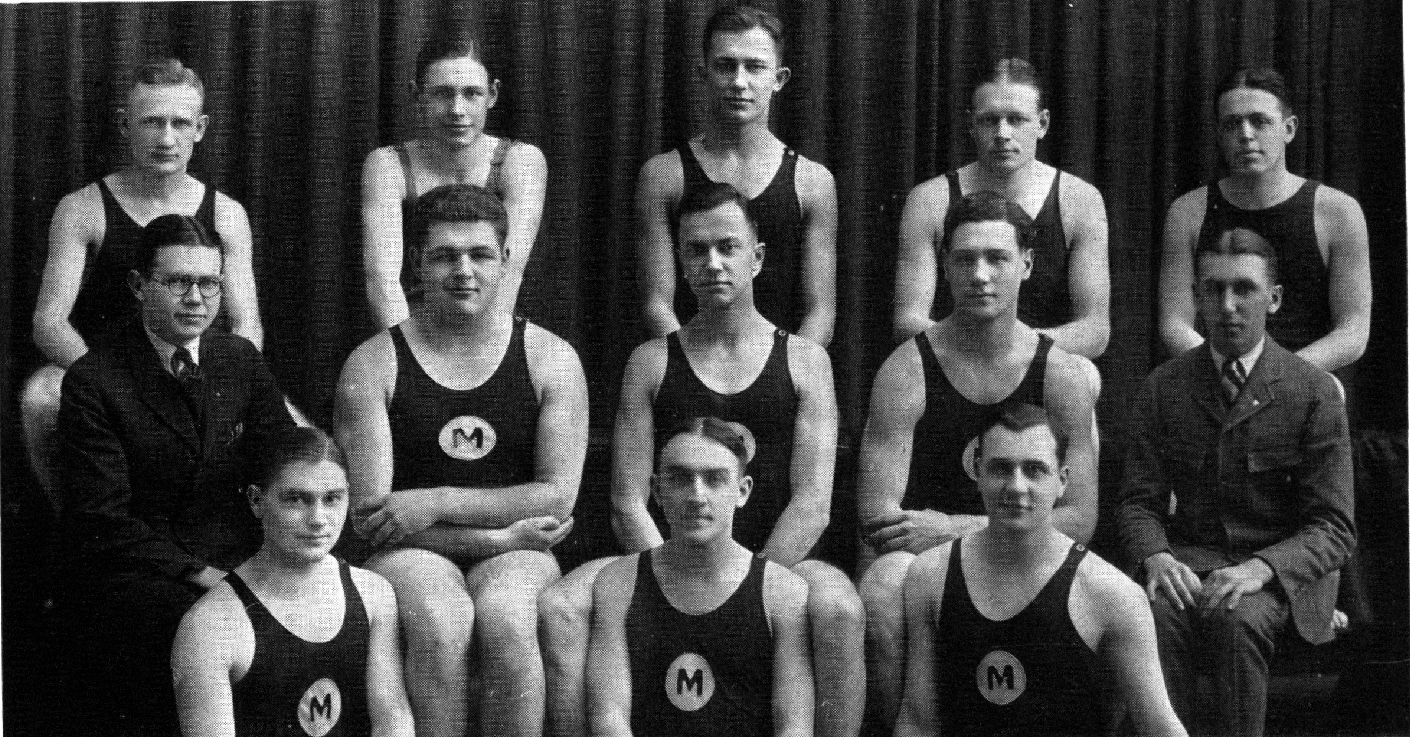
1922 Michigan swim team

=== Coaching history ===
The University of Michigan Men's Swimming program began in 1921 and has had nine coaches in its history. The current coach is Mike Bottom, who became head coach after the departure of Bob Bowman in 2008. In five years at Michigan, Bottom has compiled dual-meet record of 40-3-1 (25–1 against Big Ten opponents) while winning four Big Ten Championships (2009, 2011–13) and an NCAA Championship (2013). He is a three-time Big Ten Swimming Coach of the Year (2011–13) and was the 2013 CSCAA Swimming Coach of the Year.

The coaching history is as follows:

- John Jerome (1921–1922)
  - Record: 0–1–0
- William Brown (1922–1924)
  - Record: 3–4–1
- Gerald Barnes (1924–1925)
  - Record: 4–0–0
- Matthew Mann (1925–1954)
  - Record: 203–25–3
  - Achievements: Big Ten Championships (16), National Championships (13)
- Gus Stager (1954–1979, 1981–1982)
  - Record: 188–40–1
  - Achievements: Big Ten Championships (3), National Championships (4)
- Bill Farley (1979–1981)
  - Record: 14–4–0
- Jon Urbanchek (1982–2004)
  - Record: 163–34–0
  - Achievements: Big Ten Championships (13), National Championships (1)
- Bob Bowman (2004–2008)
  - Record: 30-8-1 in dual meets, including 21-1-1 against Big Ten opponents
  - Achievements: Big Ten Championships (1)
- Mike Bottom (2008–2023)
  - Record: 111–13–1
  - Achievements: Big Ten Championships (9), National Championships (1)
- Matt Bowe (2023–present)

=== Notable alumni ===
This is a list of notable swimmers and divers who have been affiliated with the University of Michigan.

Updated July 14, 2023

- (Peru) Alejandro Alvizuri
- (Canada) Tom Arusoo
- (Austria) Felix Auböck
- (Canada) Garnet Ault
- (United States) Mike Barrowman
- (Brazil) Gustavo Borges
- (South Africa) Dylan Bosch
- (Turkey) Derya Büyükuncu
- (United States) Patrick Callan
- (Puerto Rico) Fernando Cañales
- (United States) Tyler Clary
- (Israel) Gal Cohen Groumi
- (United States) Bill Darnton
- (Australia) John Davies
- (United States) Tom Dolan
- (United Kingdom) Gordon Downie
- (United States) Bill Farley
- (Mexico) Álvaro Gaxiola
- (United States) Dave Gillanders
- (United States) Ronald Gora
- (United States) Dick Hanley
- (United States) Francis Heydt
- (United States) Harry Holiday
- (United States) Charlie Houchin
- (Canada) Andrew Hurd
- (United States) Connor Jaeger
- (United States) Burwell Jones
- (United States) Dan Ketchum
- (United States) Dick Kimball
- (United States) Brent Lang
- (United States) Frank Legacki
- (Canada) Byron MacDonald
- (United States) Daniel Madwed
- (Canada) Bill Mahony
- (United States) Tom Malchow
- (Israel) Alon Mandel
- (United States) Strother Martin
- (United Kingdom) Alan McClatchey
- (United States) Eric Namesnik
- (Denmark) Anders Nielsen
- (Philippines) Raymond Papa
- (United States) Richard Papenguth
- (United States) Michael Phelps
- (United States) Andy Potts
- (Canada) Owen Von Richter
- (United States) Carl Robie
- (United States) Sean Ryan
- (United States) Richard Rydze
- (United States) Bob Sohl
- (United States) Gus Stager
- (United States) Charlie Swanson
- (United States) Davis Tarwater
- (United States) Chris Thompson
- (United States) Jon Urbanchek
- (United States) Alex Vanderkaay
- (United States) Peter Vanderkaay
- (United Kingdom) Jack Wardrop
- (United States) Bob Webster
- (Netherlands) Marcel Wouda
- (United States) Eric Wunderlich

== Women's swimming and diving ==
=== History ===
The University of Michigan Women's Swimming program has been a varsity sport since 1974. The current coach is Mike Bottom, who took over in August 2012, when the men's and women's teams were combined. He took over the post from head coach Jim Richardson who had been head coach of the Women's swim team for 27 years. Richardson announced his retirement on May 16, 2012. His teams won 12 consecutive Big Ten Conference titles from 1987 to 1998.

Christine Rawak was an assistant swim coach at the University of Michigan from 1992 to 1997. On February 19, 2025, USA Swimming named her its new CEO and president. Nine days later, USA Swimming's board of governors announced that Rawak would not assume the role as CEO and president due to "unforeseen personal circumstances that we learned about late this week." USA Swimming stated that it had just learned of a complaint against her regarding her conduct while coaching at the University of Michigan that had been filed with the U.S. Center for SafeSport, an organization that handles abuse and misconduct claims, that Rawak had not disclosed during what USA Swimming called a "rigorous" vetting process. When it raised the issue with Rawak, USA Swimming said Rawak informed it that she intended to resign.

=== Coaching history ===
The coaching history is as follows:

- Johanna High (1975)
  - Record 3–1–0
- Stu Isaac (1976–1983)
  - Record: 47–7–0
  - Achievements: Big Ten Championships (5)
- Peter Lindsay (1984–1985)
  - Record: 7–10–0
- Jim Richardson (1986–2012)
  - Record: 175–77–0
  - Achievements: Big Ten Championships (14)
- Mike Bottom (2012–2023)
  - Record: 74–19
  - Achievements: Big Ten Championships (3)
- Matt Bowe (2023–present)

=== Notable alumnae ===
This is a list of notable swimmers and divers who have been affiliated with the University of Michigan.

Updated July 14, 2023

- (United States) Samantha Arsenault
- (United States) Ann Colloton
- (United States) Mindy Gehrs
- (Hong Kong) Siobhán Haughey
- (United States) Micki King
- (Canada) Maggie Mac Neil
- (United States) Christina Seufert
- (Canada) Shannon Shakespeare
- (Peru) Valeria Silva
- (United States) Joan Spillane
- (China) Bi Yirong

== U-M in the International Swimming Hall of Fame ==
Michigan's rich history in swimming and diving is evidenced by the 18 former student-athletes and coaches enshrined in the International Swimming Hall of Fame, located in Ft. Lauderdale, Florida. Individuals may be inducted into the International Swimming Hall of Fame as a swimmer, diver, water polo player, synchronized swimmer, coach or contributor. Criteria for selection into the Hall of Fame include achievements at the Olympic, World Championship and national levels, as well as world records held. Athletes must be retired from competition a minimum of four years, or at least one Olympic quadrennial. Individuals who are neither competitors nor coaches may be elected as a "contributor" whose achievements and innovations have had a profound effect on swimming and/or its administration.

=== ISHOF members ===
Updated July 14, 2023

- (United States) Mike Barrowman (1997) – Swimming
- (Brazil) Gustavo Borges (2012) – Swimming
- (Australia) John Davies (1984) – Swimming
- (United States) William Dawson (1986) – Contributor
- (United States) Dick Degener (1971) – Diving
- (United States) Tom Dolan (2006) – Swimming
- (United States) Taylor Drysdale (1994) – Swimming
- (United States) Virginia Duenkel (1985) – Swimming
- (United States) Jam Handy (1965) – Contributor
- (United States) Bruce Harlan (1973) – Diving
- (United States) Harry Holiday (1991) – Swimming
- (United States) Dick Kimball (1985) – Coach / Diving
- (United States) Micki King (1978) – Diving
- (United States) Tom Malchow (2014) – Swimming
- (United States) / (United Kingdom) Matt Mann II (1965) – Coach
- (United States) Robert Mowerson (1986) – Coach
- (United States) Richard Papenguth (1986) – Coach
- (United States) Carl Robie (1976) – Swimming
- (United States) Gus Stager (1982) – Coach
- (United States) Jon Urbanchek (2008) – Coach
- (United States) Bob Webster (1970) – Diving

== Club Wolverine ==
=== About ===
The USA club swimming team that is affiliated with the university team is Club Wolverine. The college swimmers train with the Club Wolverine Elite Team during the summer, but Club Wolverine is a parent run swim team for swimmers of all ages and abilities. It is routinely ranked the #1 club in Michigan and one of the top clubs in the U.S.

=== Professional swimming ===
Club Wolverine has a squad of professional swimmers including many international superstars in the sport. Most notably, Michael Phelps trained on Club Wolverine for the four years leading up to the 2008 Beijing Olympics.

=== Summer camps ===
The Club Wolverine team in congruence with the University of Michigan Varsity Swimming program runs a week-long stay-away camp in the summer.
