= Don Sheff =

American former competition swimmer (born 1931)

- Sheff as Yale swimmer

Personal information
- Full name: Donald Alexander Sheff
- Nickname: "Don"
- National team: United States
- Born: June 27, 1931 (age 95) Brooklyn, New York, U.S.
- Occupations: Photographer, instructor
- Height: 178 cm (5 ft 10 in)
- Weight: 69 kg (152 lb)

Sport
- Sport: Swimming
- Event: 100, 200 Freestyle
- Strokes: Freestyle
- Club: New Haven Swim Club
- College team: Yale University (1953)
- Coach: Bill Lux (Lincoln High); Robert J. H. Kiphuth (Yale)
Medal record
Representing Yale
NCAA
Gold medal – first place	1952 Princeton	300 yard medley relay

Donald Alexander Sheff (born June 27, 1931) is an American former competition swimmer for Yale University who represented the United States in the men's 4×200-meter freestyle relay at the 1952 Summer Olympics in Helsinki. He later worked in New York as a photographer and as a Director of the New York Institute of Photography.

== Early life and swimming ==
Born in Brooklyn, New York on June 27, 1931 to Mr. and Mrs. Alexander L. Sheff, he attended and swam for Brooklyn's Abraham Lincoln High School near Coney Island, under Coach Bill Lux. A solid student, he graduated Lincoln in 1949 as an Honor student with a 90% average. As team captain for Lincoln in his Senior year, on January 19, 1949, at the Brooklyn Tech Pool, he swam an unrecognized record breaking time of 52.4 for the 100-yard freestyle in qualifying for the Public School Athletic League's (PSAL) swimming championships. He later became city champion in the 100-yard event with an official time in the PSAL finals of 53.8. Excelling equally well at greater distances, Sheff was a former PSAL titlist and record holder in the 220 yard freestyle. He also held the Metropolitan title in the 100 and 400-meter distance, and held the title for the Canadian 100-yard freestyle event.

== Yale University ==
A 1953 graduate, who first enrolled in the Fall of 1949, Sheff attended Yale University, and competed with their swim team under Hall of Fame Head Coach Robert J. H. Kiphuth. As a Yale student in 1951, he received All-America honors in the freestyle relays, the 100-yard freestyle, and the 50-yard freestyle. In 1951, assisted significantly by Sheff, Yale captured the National Collegiate Athletic Association (NCAA) National Championship in swimming and diving. In 1952, he swam as part of Yale's 300-yard medley relay team, helping Yale to again win an NCAA title. As a Senior in December, 1952, while majoring in economics and political institutions, Sheff was elected to Yale's Phi Beta Kappa academic honorary, and served as President of the Hillel Foundation, a religious organization.

At the Mid-Ocean championships in August 1950, in Bermuda, Sheff placed first in both the 50 and 100-yard events and was selected to represent the United States at the third annual Maccabean Games in Israel that year.

Swimming with the New Haven Sports Club, he won the AAU outdoor championship from 1950-51, as part of a 880-yard freestyle relay team that won the AAU (Amateur Athletic Union). He also captured the AAU indoor championship four times in the early 1950's as a part of a 400-yard freestyle relay team. In 1953, he placed first in the 300-yard medley relay.

== Relay world records ==
In his career, he set two non-individual world records in Long Course swimming, a 3:47.9 as a member of a 4×100-meter freestyle relay in New Haven, Connecticut which held from March 19, 1951 - August 6, 1955. He also swam a record 8:29.4 as a member of a 4×200 meter freestyle relay team, which held from February 16, 1952 - November 4, 1956.

== 1952 Helsinki Olympics ==
He competed for the gold medal-winning U.S. team in the preliminary heats of the men's 4×200-meter freestyle relay. Sheff did not receive a medal, however, because under the 1952 Olympic swimming rules, relay swimmers who did not compete in the event final were not medal-eligible. Sheff swam in the second preliminary heat of the 4x200 freestyle relay, with his team recording a combined time of 8:50.9, allowing the American team to advance to the finals. In the final heat, in which Sheff did not swim, despite being heavily favored, the American team won the gold with a combined time of 8:31.1 in a relatively close race with the second place Japanese team who finished 2.4 seconds later. The American team was aided greatly by the catch-up swim of Hawaiian Ford Konno, and the strong swim of anchor Jimmy McLane.

In the 1952 Olympics, Sheff was managed by U.S. Head Olympic and Hall of Fame Coach Matt Mann, an early Yale swim coach, who spent most of his career coaching at the University of Michigan. In the prior Olympics in 1948, Sheff's Yale Coach R. H. Kiphuth had been the U.S. Olympic team's head swimming coach, where he led the U.S. Olympic women's team to win every event.

== Post swimming career ==
Formerly having worked as a photographer, in 1988 Sheff served as the Director of the New York Institute of Photography. Ascending to the position of President, Sheff served with the New York Institute of Photography, and its affiliated organization Video5000. Photographers and videographers who were selected as members of the New York Institute had to meet professional standards and attend training. In 1990, Sheff authored the well-advertised and distributed brochure, "Photography Tips for the Bride", published by the New York Institute of Photography.

== See also ==
- List of Yale University people
- World record progression 4 × 100 metres freestyle relay
- World record progression 4 × 200 metres freestyle relay
