= Burwell Jones =

American swimmer (1933–2021)

- Jones in 1952

Personal information
- Full name: Burwell Otis Jones
- Nickname: "Bumpy"
- National team: United States
- Born: March 23, 1933 Detroit, Michigan, U.S.
- Died: February 6, 2021 (aged 87)

Sport
- Sport: Swimming
- Strokes: Backstroke, freestyle medley
- College team: University of Michigan
- Coach: Matthew Mann; Gus Stager (Michigan)
Medal record
Men's swimming
Representing the United States
Pan American Games
Gold medal – first place	1951 Buenos Aires	4×200 m free
Bronze medal – third place	1951 Buenos Aires	100 m back
Representing Michigan
NCAA
Gold medal – first place	1952 Princeton	150 yard individual medley
Gold medal – first place	1952 Princeton	400 yard freestyle relay
Gold medal – first place	1953 Columbus	150 yard individual medley
Gold medal – first place	1953 Columbus	400 yard freestyle relay
Gold medal – first place	1954 Syracuse	150 yard individual medley
Gold medal – first place	1954 Syracuse	400 yard freestyle relay

Burwell Otis Jones (March 23, 1933 – February 6, 2021) was a physician specializing in dermatology, and a former American competition swimmer. He was an All-American for the University of Michigan, and represented the U.S. in the 1952 Olympics, later receiving a gold medal when Olympic rules changed allowing him to receive his medal for winning the preliminary in the 4x200 freestyle relay, though not competing in the final heat that won the event. He was a 1951 Pan American Games gold and bronze medalist, and a recurring age group National champion in United States Masters Swimming into his later years.

== Early swimming career ==
Jones starting swimming by the age of five and at twelve began attending Chikopi Summer Camp in Ontario, Canada, where he started a relationship with University of Michigan Swim Coach Matt Mann II who served as a summer swimming mentor and had founded the camp around 1920. During High School, Bumpy would occasionally drive from Detroit to Ann Arbor to swim with the outstanding swimmers coached by Coach Mann at the University of Michigan.

Swimming for swim Coach Dick Stuckey, Jones attended Detroit's Redford High School, where by 16 he was an All-American in swimming. By November 1948, at 15, Jones held the National Individual Medley Record for his age group. As a 16-year-old junior in 1949, he helped lead a four-person 200-yard relay to a National Interscholastic record. During his high school career at Redford, he held 18 state championships, and had six metropolitan league records.

== International competition ==
At the 1951 Pan American Games held in Buenos Aires, Argentina, he won the bronze medal in the men's 100-meter backstroke, and a gold medal in the men's 4×200-meter freestyle relay event, alongside teammates Dick Cleveland, Ronald Gora and Bill Heusner.

=== 1952 Olympics ===
At the 1952 Summer Olympics in Helsinki, Finland, Jones swam for the gold medal-winning U.S. team in the preliminary heats of the men's 4×200-meter freestyle relay. Although the U.S. team finished first, Jones did not receive a medal under the 1952 rules because he did not swim in the event final. Years later he would receive his gold medal after the rule changed. During several summers, he trained with Soichi Sakamoto in Hawaii during his more competitive swimming years, as Sakamoto served as an Olympic coach for the 1952 Olympics. As part of the U.S. Olympic team, he competed in Bermuda, Japan, and England and in his more competitive career was also mentored by Yale swimming coach Bob Kiphuth, and Ohio State Swim Coach Mike Peppe.

=== University of Michigan ===
Jones attended the University of Michigan beginning in February 1951 after high school graduation. He swam and served as captain in his senior year for the Michigan Wolverines swimming and diving team under coaches Matthew Mann and Gus Stager in National Collegiate Athletic Association (NCAA) where he competed from around 1952 to 1955. In his freshman year at Michigan in 1951, at the National AAU championships, he swam a time of 3:52.2, breaking the American record for the 300-meter medley, which then consisted of 100 meters each of butterfly, back, and freestyle.

Jones was a four-time NCAA champion, mostly in the 150-yard individual medley, a five-time All-American, and a nominee for the prestigious Sullivan award given to the greatest single athlete of the year. Jones was the holder of three world records in the 400-meter individual medley, and held the first world record in the event when the butterfly was first added. He continues to hold the world record in the 150-meter individual medley, which at the time of his records excluded the butterfly stroke.

In 1956, he married his college sweetheart, Rita-al Goding who survived him. They were married 36 years and had five children, two boys and three girls. In 1992, he married Kathleen Anne Jones.

Jones became a doctor, specializing in dermatology. He attended U of Michigan Medical School, graduating in 1959, and did residencies at U. of Virginia, and then at the U.S. Air Force and Duke. In 1965, he settled in Sarasota, Florida, where he had a private practice in dermatology for many years.

== Swim competition post-Olympics ==
In 1956, he was in medical school, and didn't want to take the time out to train for the Olympics. Jones tried to stay in top competitive condition, and at age 27, despite a five-year retirement from swimming, he attempted to make the 1960 U.S. Olympic team, but failed to qualify in the 200-meter freestyle despite improving on his earlier times. With more competitive and younger swimmers abounding, he missed a spot on the team by only half a second.

=== US Masters swimming ===
After his move to Sarasota, Florida, in 1965, he swam first with Suncoast Masters and then Sarasota YMCA Sharks Masters. Jones observed that as far as the age for peak athletic performances are concerned, "It seems...there isn't a set peak. Instead it might be a plateau. It seems conceivable that this plateau could last from 18 to 50 or 60." Considering Jones's times in Master's swimming through his 70's, his observations seemed to have merit. Many of his Master's swim times, at least in his early years in his 40's nearly equaled his best collegiate times.

He was involved in the establishment of U.S. Masters Swimming in 1970, and began competing in masters swimming in 1971. He won 110 Masters National Championships 110 times, and set 145 total Master's national age group records, and won five FINA Masters World Championships. He was inducted into the Masters International Swimming Hall of Fame in 2005.

In June 1973, at age 40, he broke five age group records at the AAU Long Course Meet, and set a National age group record in the 100 freestyle of 1:00.6. In May, 1974, he swam a few events close to his earliest records at the AAU National Short Course Championships at Fort Lauderdale's Hall of Fame Pool, which included breaking his own record in the 200 IM with a time of 2:15.3, and swimming only one second off his previous year's time in the 200-yard freestyle.

At 43, in April, 1976 at the AAU Southern Regional Masters Championships, Jones broke the National age group record for the 1,650-yard freestyle (mile) in a time of 18:25.0, the fastest time for the event for any age group. Jones claimed that in 1974, he had lost very little speed, and later at 55 broke six national records at the Southern Masters Swimming Championships in the 55-59 age group in St. Petersburg, Florida in April 1988. These included the 200 and 400 IM, the 200 and 1650-yard freestyle, and the 200 backstroke. Continuing to stay active in the swimming community in Sarasota, Florida, the Bumpy Jones Swimming Classic, sponsored by the Sarasota YMCA Sharks was held in June 2006.

Jones continued to swim as he aged, setting four National records in a Short Course Yards Championship, swimming for the Sarasota YMCA Sharks in the 75–79 age group in 2008; the 1000-yard free, the 1,650-yard free, the 100 backstroke, and the 200 individual medley. That year he helped to reorganize the Sarasota Swim Club.

Around the time of his medical residency, he became an accomplished golfer, with victories in 28 tournaments, both state and local. He continued to practice golf in his retirement and swam occasionally in the single lane 25-yard pool. Jones died at 87 in the Sarasota, Florida area, and was interred at Sarasota National Cemetery. He had suffered from Alzheimer's and vascular dementia.

== See also ==
- List of University of Michigan alumni
