= Swimming at the 1955 Pan American Games – Men's 100 metre freestyle =

Men's 100 metre freestyle at the 1955 Pan American Games
- Venue: -
- Dates: March 24 (preliminaries and finals)

Medalists
Gold medal	Clarke Scholes	United States
Silver medal	George Park	Canada
Bronze medal	Carl Woolley	United States

The men's 100 metre freestyle competition of the swimming events at the 1955 Pan American Games took place on 24 March. The last Pan American Games champion was Dick Cleveland of US.

This race consisted of two lengths of the pool, both lengths being in freestyle.

== Results ==
All times are in minutes and seconds.

KEY:	q	Fastest non-qualifiers	Q	Qualified	GR	Games record	NR	National record	PB	Personal best	SB	Seasonal best

=== Final ===
The final was held on March 24.

Rank	Name	Nationality	Time	Notes
1st place, gold medalist(s)	Clarke Scholes	United States	57.7	GR
2nd place, silver medalist(s)	George Park	Canada	58.7	
3rd place, bronze medalist(s)	Carl Woolley	United States	59.3	
4	Pedro Galvão	Argentina	59.7	
5	Milward Martin	United States	1:00.1	
6	Otilio Holguin	Mexico	1:00.4	
7	Federico Zwanck	Argentina	1:00.7	
8	Antonio Galvez	Cuba	1:02.8	
