= Swimming at the 1955 Pan American Games – Men's 400 metre freestyle =

Men's 400 metre freestyle at the 1955 Pan American Games
- Venue: -
- Dates: March 23 (preliminaries and finals)

Medalists
Gold medal	Jimmy McLane	United States
Silver medal	Wayne Moore	United States
Bronze medal	Oscar Kramer	Argentina

The men's 400 metre freestyle competition of the swimming events at the 1955 Pan American Games took place on 23 March. The last Pan American Games champion was Tetsuo Okamoto of Brazil.

This race consisted of eight lengths of the pool, with all eight being in the freestyle stroke.

== Results ==
All times are in minutes and seconds.

KEY:	q	Fastest non-qualifiers	Q	Qualified	GR	Games record	NR	National record	PB	Personal best	SB	Seasonal best

=== Final ===
The final was held on March 23.

Rank	Name	Nationality	Time	Notes
1st place, gold medalist(s)	Jimmy McLane	United States	4:51.3	GR
2nd place, silver medalist(s)	Wayne Moore	United States	4:53.4	
3rd place, bronze medalist(s)	Oscar Kramer	Argentina	4:56.1	
4	William Yorzyk	United States	4:56.9	
5	Heriberto González	Mexico	4:58.9	
6	Sílvio Kelly dos Santos	Brazil	5:02.1	
7	Federico Zwanck	Argentina	5:02.3	
8	Carlos Orozco	Mexico	5:04.7	
