= Bill Heusner =

American swimmer (1927–2002)

- Heusner as swimmer, likely in mid to late 1940's

Biographical details
- Born: June 28, 1927; Chicago, Illinois, U.S.
- Died: August 9, 2002 (aged 75); East Lansing, Michigan
- Height: 6 ft 2 in (1.88 m)
- Weight: 200 lb (91 kg)
- Education: Northwestern University; B.S. (1949) M.S. (1952); University of Illinois PHd. (1955)

Playing career
- 1945-1949: Northwestern University; Coached by Tom Robinson
- Position: Freestyle Distance

Coaching career (HC unless noted)
- 1948-1949: Northwestern University; Student Coach
- 1952-1955: University of Illinois; Graduate Student Coach
- 1955-1957: University of Southern Illinois
- 1957-1963: University of Minnesota
- 1963-1990: Michigan State University

Accomplishments and honors

Awards
- Distinguished Professor (MSU); Northwestern University Hall of Fame (1988); CSCAA Service to Aquatics Award; MISC Outstanding Service Award; NISCA Service Award
Medal record
Men's swimming
Representing the United States
Pan American Games
Gold medal – first place	1951 Buenos Aires	4×200 m freestyle
Silver medal – second place	1951 Buenos Aires	400 m freestyle
Representing Northwestern
NCAA
Gold medal – first place	1948 Ann Arbor	1,500-meter freestyle
Gold medal – first place	1949 Chapel Hill	1,500-meter freestyle

Dr. William Wilder Heusner, Jr. (June 28, 1927 – August 9, 2002) was an American competition swimmer and Pan American Games champion who competed in the 1948 London Olympics in the 400-meter and 1500-meter freestyle events. After competing in swimming and graduating with a Bachelor's and Master's from Northwestern University, he completed a PHd. from the University of Illinois in 1955, and subsequently coached swimming, performed research, and served as a college professor for 37 years. He had early stints at his alma mater Northwestern University and the University of Illinois as a student coach, then served as a successful head coach at Southern Illinois from 1955-1957. He coached at the University of Minnesota from 1957-1962 and then spent 27 years as a swim coach, professor and laboratory researcher at Michigan State University from 1962-1990.

== Early life ==
Heusner was born June 28, 1927 In Chicago, Illinois, to father William Heusner Sr. and Gertrude Livermore Heusner. He graduated Evanston Township High School in 1944. In his High School career, he played football and competed with weights as part of Track & Field. Tall and muscular for his age and era, he stood over 6'2" and weighed very near 200 pounds. He soon took up competitive swimming, serving as a Varsity Captain in his last two years at Evanston Township. As a Senior, he captured a second place finish at the 1944 Illinois State Swimming Championships in the 100-yard Freestyle. He was an outstanding student during his High School years, setting the stage for his achievements in college, graduate school, and as a professor.

== Northwestern University ==
He attended Northwestern University from 1945-1949, where he competed for Hall of Fame Head Coach Tom Robinson. In his Freshman year, Heusner captured a third-place finish at the Big Ten Championships in both the 220- and 440-yard freestyle at the Big Ten Conference Championships and came in second in both the 1,500 meter and 440-yard freestyle events at NCAA Collegiate Championships. At the Big 9 meet in 1947, he won the 1,500-meter (mile) and placed fourth in the 440-yard freestyles, establishing new conference records in both events. In 1947, at the NCAA 1,500 freestyle, he captured a second place finish. That year he was the recipient of Northwestern's awards for Most Valuable Player and N Club Achievement. As a Northwestern Junior in 1948 he won the Conference 440 and the 1500-meter freestyle events. That year he was the recipient of the Western Conference Merit Award for both athletics and scholarship, and earned a berth in the U.S. 1948 Olympic team. Graduating in 1949, he completed a B.S. degree in Mathematics and Physics and then earned a Masters in Physical Education from Northwestern in 1952. Beginning in the Fall of 1952, attending with a fellowship, he completed a PHd. in Kinesiology from the University of Illinois in 1955.

Utilizing his career interests in technology and teaching, he served in the US military from 1946-1947 as a West Point instructor in Radar.

== 1948 London Olympics ==
Heusner represented the United States at the 1948 Summer Olympics in London, England under Hall of Fame Olympic Head Coach Robert J. H. Kiphuth. An exceptionally strong team that year, the U.S. won all the Olympic swimming and diving competitions. Heusner competed in the preliminary heats of the men's 400-meter freestyle making the semi-finals but just missing the finals with a time of 4:57.4. In one of his signature events, he finished eighth in the final of the men's 1,500-meter freestyle with a time of 20:45.4, placing him just over a minute out of contending for a medal.

Heusner demonstrated his strengths in distance and relay freestyle events at the 1951 Pan American Games. He won the silver medal in the men's 400-meter freestyle, and won a gold medal as a member of the winning U.S. team in the men's 4×200-meter freestyle relay event, alongside relay teammates Dick Cleveland, Burwell Jones, and Ronald Gora.

On April 19, 1952, Heusner married Eleanor Jessie Fraser, a graduate of Northwestern, in Mount Vernon, New York, at the Vernon Heights Congregational Church.

== Coaching ==
Heusner coached swimming first in short stints at his alma mater Northwestern, then at the University of Illinois as a student coach while obtaining his PHd., and from 1955-1957 as a Head Coach at Southern Illinois. Gaining recognition in one of his early Head Coaching positions, he coached at the University of Minnesota from 1957-1963, where he led the team from a last place to a third place finish at the NCAA's, mentoring five national champions and four 1962 Olympians.

=== Michigan State University coach ===
In 1963, he began his longest coaching stint as part of the Human Energy Resources Laboratory at Michigan State University where he did research and coached the swimming team for twenty-seven years from 1963-1990.

An important contributor to the swimming community, he served on swimming's NCAA rules committee, and helped write and update the men's and women's swimming rules book for the NCAA. Recognized for his coaching skills and accomplishments, in 1962 he helped coach the U.S. National team. With his background in physiology and research, he became known world-wide as an expert in teaching swimming technique. Utilizing his expertise in rules and procedures for swimming competitions, he served as a Head referee for Big 10 conference and NCAA championships during his coaching career.

=== Honors ===
Heusner received awards for achievements in High School, College, and as an outstanding coach, researcher, and professor during his long academic career. Recognized for his early career achievements, he was made a member of the Evanston Township High School Athletic Hall of Fame in 1995. He was named a Distinguished Professor at Michigan State University, and in 1988 was inducted into the Northwestern University Hall of Fame for his athletic achievements. In a distinctive honor, the William Heusner Award for swimming excellence was established in his name by Evanston Township High School for members of their swim team.

Heusner died August 9, 2002 at the age of 75 in East Lansing, Michigan, where he had taught at Michigan State. He was survived by his wife Eleanor Fraser Heusner, and three daughters. Services were held on the morning of Wednesday, August 14, 2002 at the People's Church on West Grand River Ave. in East Lansing. He was interned at East Lawn Memory Gardens in Okemos, Michigan with military honors, having served as a WWII era veteran.

== See also ==
- List of Northwestern University alumni
