= 1955 NCAA swimming and diving championships =

American college aquatic sports competition

- Host city: Oxford, Ohio
- Date(s): March 1955
- Venue(s): Billings Natatorium; Miami University
- Teams: 23
- Events: 14

The 1955 NCAA swimming and diving championships were contested in March 1955 at Billings Natatorium at Miami University in Oxford, Ohio at the 19th annual NCAA-sanctioned swim meet to determine the team and individual national champions of men's collegiate swimming and diving among its member programs in the United States.

Ohio State retained the national title, the Buckeyes' ninth, after finishing thirty-nine points ahead of Michigan and Yale in the team standings.

== Program ==
- The 100 yard butterfly was dropped from the program, although it would be re-added two years later in 1957.
- The 200 yard breaststroke was added to the program. This would be the first appearance of a breaststroke event at the NCAA championships.

== Team standings ==
- (H) = Hosts
- (DC) = Defending champions
- Italics = Debut appearance

Rank	Team	Points
1st place, gold medalist(s)	Ohio State (DC)	90
2nd place, silver medalist(s)	Michigan	51
2nd place, silver medalist(s)	Yale	51
4	NC State	20
5	North Carolina	17
6	Harvard	15
7	Iowa	14
7	Oklahoma	14
9	Iowa State	13
10	Stanford	11
11	Indiana	9
12	Dartmouth	8
13	Cortland State	5
13	Purdue	5
13	Springfield	5
16	Georgia	4
17	Denver	3
18	Army	2
18	Cornell	2
18	La Salle	2
18	USC	2
22	Ohio	1
22	Wisconsin	1

== Individual events ==
=== Swimming ===
Event	Champion	Team	Time
50 yard freestyle	Kerry Donovan	Yale	22.8
100 yard freestyle	(Australia) Rex Aubrey	Yale	50.7
220 yard freestyle	(United Kingdom) (Scotland) Jack Wardrop (DC)	Michigan	2:04.2
440 yard freestyle	Ford Konno (DC)	Ohio State	4:31.1
1,500 meter freestyle	Ford Konno (DC)	Ohio State	18:16.1
100 yard backstroke	Yoshi Oyakawa (DC)	Ohio State	58.0
200 yard backstroke	Yoshi Oyakawa (DC)	Ohio State	2:07.7
200 yard breaststroke	Bob Mattson	NC State	2:26.0
200 yard butterfly	Phillip Drake	North Carolina	2:13.7
150 yard individual medley	Albert Wiggins	Ohio State	1:26.5
400 yard freestyle relay	(Australia) Rex Aubrey; Hendrik Gideonse; Daniel Cornwell; Malcolm Aldrich	Yale	3:24.9
300 yard medley relay	Yoshi Oyakawa; Albert Wiggins; Ed Kawachika	Ohio State (DC)	2:42.2

=== Diving ===
Event	Champion	Team	Score
1 meter diving	Fletcher Gilders (DC)	Ohio State	535.05
3 meter diving	Gerry Harrison	Ohio State	590.25

== See also ==
- List of college swimming and diving teams
