= Wayne Moore (swimmer) =

American swimmer (1931–2015)

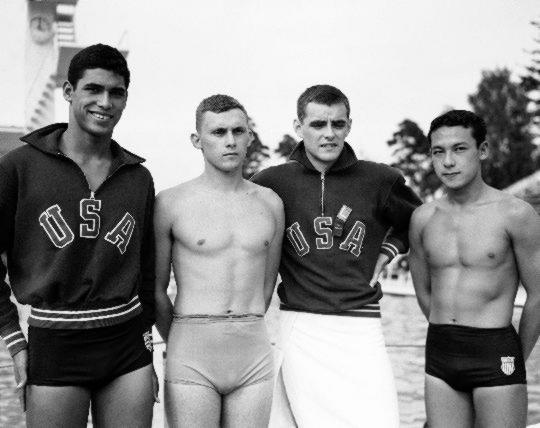
- Gold medal winning U.S. team of 4 × 200 meters free relay in Helsinki 1952: William Woolsey (at left), Wayne Moore, James McLane and Ford Konno.

Personal information
- Full name: Wayne Richard Moore
- National team: United States
- Born: November 20, 1931 Bridgeport, Connecticut, U.S.
- Died: February 20, 2015 (aged 83) Trumbull, Connecticut, U.S.
- Occupations: President, Moore Special Tool; Precision Tool Makers
- Spouse: Janice Elaine Weyls
- Children: 5

Sport
- Sport: Swimming
- Strokes: Freestyle
- Club: New Haven Swim Club
- College team: Yale University
- Coach: Robert J. H. Kiphuth (Yale)
Medal record
Men's swimming
Representing the United States
Olympic Games
Gold medal – first place	1952 Helsinki	4×200 m freestyle
Pan American Games
Gold medal – first place	1955 Mexico City	4×200 m freestyle
Silver medal – second place	1955 Mexico City	400 m freestyle
Representing Yale
NCAA
Gold medal – first place	1952 Princeton	220 yard freestyle
Gold medal – first place	1953 Columbus	Team title
Gold medal – first place	1953 Columbus	220 yard freestyle

Wayne Richard Moore (November 20, 1931 – February 20, 2015) was an American competition swimmer, who competed for Yale University, a 1952 Helsinki Olympic champion, and a former world record-holder.

Moore was born in Bridgeport, Connecticut on November 20, 1931, the son of Richard F. and Mary S. Moore, and lived in the Bridgeport area throughout his life. He was a 1949 graduate of Warren Harding High School.

== 1952 Olympics ==
Moore represented the United States at the 1952 Summer Olympics in Helsinki, Finland, where he won a gold medal in the men's 4×200-meter freestyle relay with U.S. teammates Bill Woolsey, Ford Konno and Jimmy McLane. Individually, Moore also competed in the men's 400-meter freestyle at the 1952 Olympics, finishing in sixth place in the event final.

=== Yale University ===
Moore graduated from Yale University in 1953 with a degree in economics. Swimming for the Yale Bulldogs under Hall of Fame Coach Bob Kiphuth, he won NCAA titles in the 220-yard freestyle in 1952 and 440-yard freestyle in 1953.

Before his Army Service, Moore married Janice Elaine Weyls. The couple settled in Trumbull, Connecticut and had five children, and a marriage that spanned 61 years. After college and marriage, Moore was drafted in the U.S. Army and served during the Korean War.

=== Professions ===
In 1924, Moore's father founded the Moore Special Tool Company, of Bridgeport, a tool and die maker. The company specialized in ultra high-precision machine tools, such as jig borers and jig grinders. After college graduation, in 1953, Wayne went to work for Moore Special Tool, and in time became its president. In 1970 he authored the book Foundations of Mechanical Accuracy, which is considered a standard text for the design of precise and stable machinery. He served as chairman of the National Machine Tool Builders Association (NMTB), the Acme United Corporation, and was a director of the American Precision Museum and the Bridgeport Engineering Institute.

After a long illness, Moore died February 20, 2015 in Trumbull, Connecticut. He was survived by his wife, children, and many grandchildren. After a funeral service at Nichols United Methodist Church on February 28, Moore was buried at the Nichols Farm Burial Ground in Trumball, Connecticut. He was 83 years old.

== Publications ==
- Moore, Wayne R. (1970). Foundations of Mechanical Accuracy. Bridgeport, Connecticut, USA: Moore Tool Company. ISBN 0262130807. LCCN 73127307.

== See also ==
- List of Olympic medalists in swimming (men)
- List of Yale University people
- World record progression 4 × 200 metres freestyle relay
