= Swimming at the 1955 Pan American Games – Men's 4 × 200 metre freestyle relay =

Men's 4 × 200 metre freestyle relay at the 1955 Pan American Games
- Venue: -
- Dates: March 25 (preliminaries and finals)

Medalists
Gold medal	Martin Smith, William Yorzyk, Wayne Moore and Jimmy McLane	United States
Silver medal	-	Argentina
Bronze medal	-	Canada

The men's 4 × 200 metre freestyle relay competition of the swimming events at the 1955 Pan American Games took place on 25 March. The defending Pan American Games champion was the United States.

This race consisted of sixteen lengths of the pool. Each of the four swimmers completed four lengths of the pool. The first swimmer had to touch the wall before the second could leave the starting block.

== Results ==
All times are in minutes and seconds.

KEY:	q	Fastest non-qualifiers	Q	Qualified	GR	Games record	NR	National record	PB	Personal best	SB	Seasonal best

=== Final ===
The final was held on March 25.

Rank	Name	Nationality	Time	Notes
1st place, gold medalist(s)	Martin Smith; William Yorzyk; Wayne Moore; Jimmy McLane	United States	9:00.0	
2nd place, silver medalist(s)	- - - -	Argentina	9:09.0	
3rd place, bronze medalist(s)	- - - -	Canada	9:12.2	
4	- - - -	Mexico	9:12.7	
5	- - - -	Brazil	9:19.4	
6	- - - -	El Salvador	9:49.0	
7	- - - -	Cuba	10:08.9	
8	- - - -	-	-	
