= 1954 NCAA swimming and diving championships =

American college aquatic sports competition

- Host city: (New York (state)) Syracuse, New York
- Date(s): March 1954
- Venue(s): Webster Pool; Syracuse University
- Teams: 26
- Events: 14

The 1954 NCAA swimming and diving championships were contested in March 1954 at Webster Pool at Syracuse University in Syracuse, New York at the 18th annual NCAA-sanctioned swim meet to determine the team and individual national champions of men's collegiate swimming and diving among its member programs in the United States.

Ohio State returned to the top of the team standings, capturing the Buckeyes' eighth national title.

== Team standings ==
- (H) = Hosts
- (DC) = Defending champions
- Italics = Debut appearance

Rank	Team	Points
1st place, gold medalist(s)	Ohio State	94
2nd place, silver medalist(s)	Michigan	67
3rd place, bronze medalist(s)	Yale (DC)	36
4	Harvard	23
5	Stanford	19
6	Dartmouth	14
7	Springfield	11
8	Georgia	9
8	Michigan State	9
8	Northwestern	9
11	Oklahoma	8
11	Purdue	8
11	Texas	8
14	Florida	4
14	Williams	4
14	Wisconsin	4
17	Cortland State	3
17	Denver	3
17	Florida State	3
20	Army	2
20	Illinois	2
22	Hastings	1
22	Iowa	1
22	Iowa State	1
22	NC State	1
22	Pittsburgh	1

== Individual events ==
=== Swimming ===
Event	Champion	Team	Time
50 yard freestyle	Dick Cleveland	Ohio State	22.3
100 yard freestyle	Dick Cleveland	Ohio State	50.0
220 yard freestyle	(United Kingdom) (Scotland) Jack Wardrop	Michigan	2:05.0
440 yard freestyle	Ford Konno	Ohio State	4:28.6
1,500 meter freestyle	Ford Konno	Ohio State	18:14.4
100 yard backstroke	Yoshi Oyakawa (DC)	Ohio State	57.0
200 yard backstroke	Yoshi Oyakawa (DC)	Ohio State	2:09.8
100 yard butterfly	(Australia) David Hawkins	Harvard	59.4
200 yard butterfly	(Australia) David Hawkins	Harvard	2:15.4
150 yard individual medley	Burwell Jones (DC)	Michigan	1:30.1
400 yard freestyle relay	Thomas Benner; Ronald Gora; Donald Hill; Burwell Jones	Michigan (DC)	3:26.1
300 yard medley relay	Yoshi Oyakawa; Robert Van Heyde; Thomas Whiteleather	Ohio State (DC)	2:49.3

=== Diving ===
Event	Champion	Team	Score
1 meter diving	Fletcher Gilders	Ohio State	444.10
3 meter diving	Morley Shapiro	Ohio State	530.00

== See also ==
- List of college swimming and diving teams
