= 1957 NCAA swimming and diving championships =

American college aquatic sports competition

- Host city: Chapel Hill, North Carolina
- Date(s): March 1957
- Venue(s): Bowman Gray Pool; University of North Carolina
- Teams: 22
- Events: 16

The 1957 NCAA swimming and diving championships were contested in March 1957 at the Bowman Gray Pool at the University of North Carolina in Chapel Hill, North Carolina at the 21st annual NCAA-sanctioned swim meet to determine the team and individual national champions of men's collegiate swimming and diving among its member programs in the United States.

A total of sixteen individual events, alongside a team championship, were contested as part of this year's program.

Michigan regained the national title, the Wolverines' seventh (and first since 1948), after finishing eight points ahead of Yale in the team standings.

== Program changes ==
- Three new events were added to the NCAA championships program this year: the 100 yard breaststroke, 100 yard butterfly, and 400 yard medley relay.
- One event, the 300 yard medley relay, was dropped.

== Team standings ==
- (H) = Hosts
- (DC) = Defending champions
- Italics = Debut appearance

| Rank | Team | Points |
|---|---|---|
| 1st place, gold medalist(s) | Michigan | 69 |
| 2nd place, silver medalist(s) | Yale | 61 |
| 3rd place, bronze medalist(s) | Michigan State | 52 |
| 4 | Indiana | 48 |
| 5 | North Carolina (H) | 24 |
| 6 | Oklahoma | 23 |
| 7 | Iowa | 15 |
| 8 | Northwestern | 12 |
| 9 | SMU | 10 |
| 10 | Amherst | 9 |
| 11 | Miami (OH) | 7 |
| 12 | Army | 5 |
| 12 | Bowdoin | 5 |
| 12 | Illinois | 5 |
| 15 | Syracuse | 4 |
| 15 | Wisconsin | 4 |
| 17 | California | 3 |
| 17 | Purdue | 3 |
| 17 | Texas | 3 |
| 20 | Denver | 2 |
| 21 | Knox | 1 |
| 21 | Stanford | 1 |

- Did not place: Ohio State (DC)

== Individual events ==
=== Swimming ===
| Event | Champion | Team | Time |
|---|---|---|---|
| 50 yard freestyle | Robert Keiter | Amherst | 22.1 |
| 100 yard freestyle | Henry Dyer | Harvard | 49.4 |
| 220 yard freestyle | William Woolsey (DC) | Indiana | 2:02.5 |
| 440 yard freestyle | William Woolsey (DC) | Indiana | 4:38.2 |
| 1,500 meter freestyle | Fritz Myers | Michigan | 19:04.8 |
| 100 yard backstroke | Charles Krepp | North Carolina | 58.1 |
| 200 yard backstroke | Charles Krepp | North Carolina | 2:07.8 |
| 100 yard breaststroke | Julian Dyason | Oklahoma | 1:03.0 |
| 200 yard breaststroke | Cy Hopkins | Michigan | 2:20.0 |
| 100 yard butterfly | Timothy Jecko | Yale | 54.6 |
| 200 yard butterfly | Timothy Jecko | Yale | 2:09.5 |
| 200 yard individual medley | Timothy Jecko | Yale | 2:09.4 |
| 400 yard freestyle relay | Russell Hibbard; Daniel Cornwel; David Armstrong (Australia) Rex Aubrey | Yale (DC) | 3:23.9 |
| 400 yard medley relay | Don Adamaski; Cy Hopkins; Fred Mowrey; Dick Hanley | Michigan | 3:50.0 |

=== Diving ===
| Event | Champion | Team | Score |
|---|---|---|---|
| 1 meter diving | Dick Kimball | Michigan | 401.65 |
| 3 meter diving | Dick Kimball | Michigan | 441.35 |

== See also ==
- List of college swimming and diving teams
- NAIA men's swimming and diving championships
