= 1952 NCAA swimming and diving championships =

American college aquatic sports competition

- Host city: Princeton, New Jersey
- Date(s): March 1952
- Venue(s): Dillon Gymnasium; Princeton University
- Teams: 20
- Events: 14

The 1952 NCAA swimming and diving championships were contested in March 1952 at the pool at Dillon Gymnasium at Princeton University in Princeton, New Jersey at the 16th annual NCAA-sanctioned swim meet to determine the team and individual national champions of men's collegiate swimming and diving among its member programs in the United States.

Ohio State once again returned to the top of the team standings, earning the Buckeyes their seventh national title.

== Team standings ==
- (H) = Hosts
- (DC) = Defending champions
- Italics = Debut appearance

Rank	Team	Points
1st place, gold medalist(s)	Ohio State	94
2nd place, silver medalist(s)	Yale (DC)	81
3rd place, bronze medalist(s)	Michigan	49
4	Michigan State	27
5	Stanford	18
6	Texas	14
7	Princeton (H)	10
8	Iowa	9
9	Georgia	7
9	Purdue	7
9	Rutgers	7
12	California	4
12	Indiana	4
12	Washington	4
15	Navy	3
16	Iowa State	2
16	Wisconsin	2
18	Harvard	1
18	Northwestern	1
18	USC	1

== Individual events ==
=== Swimming ===
Event	Champion	Team	Time
50 yard freestyle	Richard Cleveland	Ohio State	22.3
100 yard freestyle	Clark Scholes (DC)	Michigan State	49.9
220 yard freestyle	Wayne Moore	Yale	2:06.8
440 yard freestyle	Ford Konno	Ohio State	4:30.3
1,500 meter freestyle	Ford Konno	Ohio State	18:15.5
100 yard backstroke	Jack Taylor	Ohio State	57.3
200 yard backstroke	Yoshi Oyakawa	Ohio State	2:07.3
100 yard butterfly	John Davies	Michigan	58.8
200 yard butterfly	John Davies	Michigan	2:12.9
150 yard individual medley	Burwell Jones	Michigan	1:29.8
400 yard freestyle relay	Thomas Benner; Burwell Jones; Donald Hill; Wallace Jeffries	Michigan	3:25.7
300 yard medley relay	Dick Thoman; Dennis O'Connor; Don Sheff	Yale	2:48.9

=== Diving ===
Event	Champion	Team	Score
1 meter diving	Skippy Browning (DC)	Texas	324.20
3 meter diving	Skippy Browning (DC)	Texas	586.40

== See also ==
- List of college swimming and diving teams
