= Swimming at the 1951 Pan American Games – Men's 100 metre freestyle =

Men's 100 metre freestyle at the 1951 Pan American Games
- Venue: -
- Dates: March 6 (preliminaries and finals)

Medalists
Gold medal	Dick Cleveland	United States
Silver medal	Ronald Gora	United States
Bronze medal	Nicasio Silverio	Cuba

The men's 100 metre freestyle competition of the swimming events at the 1951 Pan American Games took place on 6 March.

This race consisted of two lengths of the pool, both lengths being in freestyle.

== Results ==
All times are in minutes and seconds.

KEY:	q	Fastest non-qualifiers	Q	Qualified	GR	Games record	NR	National record	PB	Personal best	SB	Seasonal best

=== Final ===
The final was held on March 6.

Rank	Name	Nationality	Time	Notes
1st place, gold medalist(s)	Dick Cleveland	United States	58.8	
2nd place, silver medalist(s)	Ronald Gora	United States	59.5	
3rd place, bronze medalist(s)	Nicasio Silverio	Cuba	1:00.1	
4	-	-	-	
5	-	-	-	
6	-	-	-	
7	Paulo Catunda	Brazil	1:03.3	
8	-	-	-	
