= Jecko =

Jecko is a surname. Notable people with the surname include:

- Stephen H. Jecko (1940–2007), American Episcopal bishop
- Tim Jecko (1938–2005), American competition swimmer
