= Lincoln Hurring =

New Zealand swimmer (1931–1993)

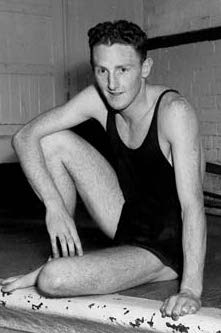
- Hurring in 1952

Personal information
- Born: Lincoln Norman William Hurring; 15 September 1931 Dunedin, New Zealand
- Died: 21 April 1993 (aged 61) Milford, New Zealand
- Education: University of Iowa
- Spouse: Jean Stewart (m. 1957)
- Relative: Gary Hurring (son)

Sport
- Country: New Zealand
- Sport: Swimming

Achievements and titles
- National finals: 100 yd backstroke: 1st (1951, 1952, 1953); 110 yd backstroke: 1st (1960); 400 yd medley: 1st (1952, 1953)
Medal record
Representing New Zealand
Commonwealth Games
Silver medal – second place	1954 Vancouver	110 yd backstroke
Silver medal – second place	1954 Vancouver	330 yd medley relay
Representing Iowa
NCAA
Gold medal – first place	1956 Ann Arbor	100 yard backstroke
Gold medal – first place	1956 Ann Arbor	200 yard backstroke

Lincoln Norman William Hurring (15 September 1931 – 21 April 1993) was a swimmer from New Zealand. He won two silver medals at the 1954 British Empire Games, in the 110 yards backstroke and in the 330 yards medley relay. He also competed in the 100 m backstroke at the 1952 and 1956 Olympics. Hurring became a swimming coach, and gave TV commentaries on several Olympics.

Hurring was born in Dunedin in 1931. In 1957 he married fellow swimmer Jean Stewart, who won an Olympic bronze medal in the 100 metres backstroke in 1952. Their son, Gary Hurring, also became an Olympic swimmer, and their daughter Kim, a television reporter.

In the 1950s, Hurring was a student at the University of Iowa on an athletic scholarship, while competing for the university's Iowa Hawkeyes swimming and diving team. While at Iowa he won several NCAA, Big Ten Conference and U.S. national open backstroke titles. In 2001 he was inducted into the University of Iowa Hall of Fame.

From 1954 Hurring and Jean Stewart coached swimming at Three Kings School in Auckland, and in 1975 they moved to the Takapuna Municipal Pool.

In 1993, aged 61, Hurring collapsed and died on Milford Beach, Auckland from a heart attack.

== See also ==
- List of Commonwealth Games medallists in swimming (men)
