= 1956 NCAA swimming and diving championships =

American college aquatic sports competition

- Host city: New Haven, Connecticut
- Date(s): March 1956
- Venue(s): Kiputh Pool; Payne Whitney Gymnasium; Yale University
- Teams: 23
- Events: 14

The 1956 NCAA swimming and diving championships were contested in March 1956 at Kiputh Pool at Payne Whitney Gymnasium at Yale University in New Haven, Connecticut at the 20th annual NCAA-sanctioned swim meet to determine the team and individual national champions of men's collegiate swimming and diving among its member programs in the United States.

Ohio State once again retained the national title, the Buckeyes' tenth, after finishing fourteen points ahead of hosts Yale in the team standings.

== Program ==
- The 150 yard individual medley was dropped from the program after seven years (1949–1955).
- The 200 yard individual medley was added to the program.

== Team standings ==
- (H) = Hosts
- (DC) = Defending champions
- Italics = Debut appearance

Rank	Team	Points
1st place, gold medalist(s)	Ohio State (DC)	68
2nd place, silver medalist(s)	Yale (H)	54
3rd place, bronze medalist(s)	Oklahoma	28
4	Iowa	27
5	NC State	25
6	Indiana	22
7	Stanford	19
8	Cortland State	15
8	Harvard	15
10	Northwestern	14
11	Michigan	10.5
12	North Carolina	9.5
13	SMU	8
14	Iowa State	7
15	Army	2
15	Bowdoin	2
15	Miami (OH)	2
15	USC	2
15	Texas A&M	2
20	Alleghany	1
20	Amherst	1
20	California	1
20	Lehigh	1

== Individual events ==
=== Swimming ===
Event	Champion	Team	Time
50 yard freestyle	Robin Moore (Australia) Rex Aubrey	Stanford; Yale	22.1
100 yard freestyle	Al Kuhn	Northwestern	49.3
220 yard freestyle	William Woolsey	Indiana	2:04.7
440 yard freestyle	William Woolsey	Indiana	4:31.1
1,500 meter freestyle	George Breen	Cortland State	18:05.9
100 yard backstroke	(New Zealand) Lincoln Hurring	Iowa	58.1
200 yard backstroke	(New Zealand) Lincoln Hurring	Iowa	2:07.5
200 yard breaststroke	Richard Fadgen	NC State	2:23.1
200 yard butterfly	Richard Fadgen	NC State	2:16.3
200 yard individual medley	Albert Wiggins	Ohio State	2:07.5
400 yard freestyle relay	Daniel Cornwell; Joseph Robinson; David Armstrong; Hendrik Gideonse	Yale (DC)	3:23.1
300 yard medley relay	William Clinton; Daniel Cornwell (Australia) Rex Aubrey	Yale	2:46.3

=== Diving ===
Event	Champion	Team	Score
1 meter diving	Frank Fraunfelter	Ohio State	514.10
3 meter diving	Donald Harper	Ohio State	505.35

== See also ==
- List of college swimming and diving teams
