= Al Wiggins =

Al Wiggins may refer to:

- Alan Wiggins (1958–1991), American baseball player
- Albert Wiggins (1935–2011), American swimmer
