= Yoshi Oyakawa =

American swimmer

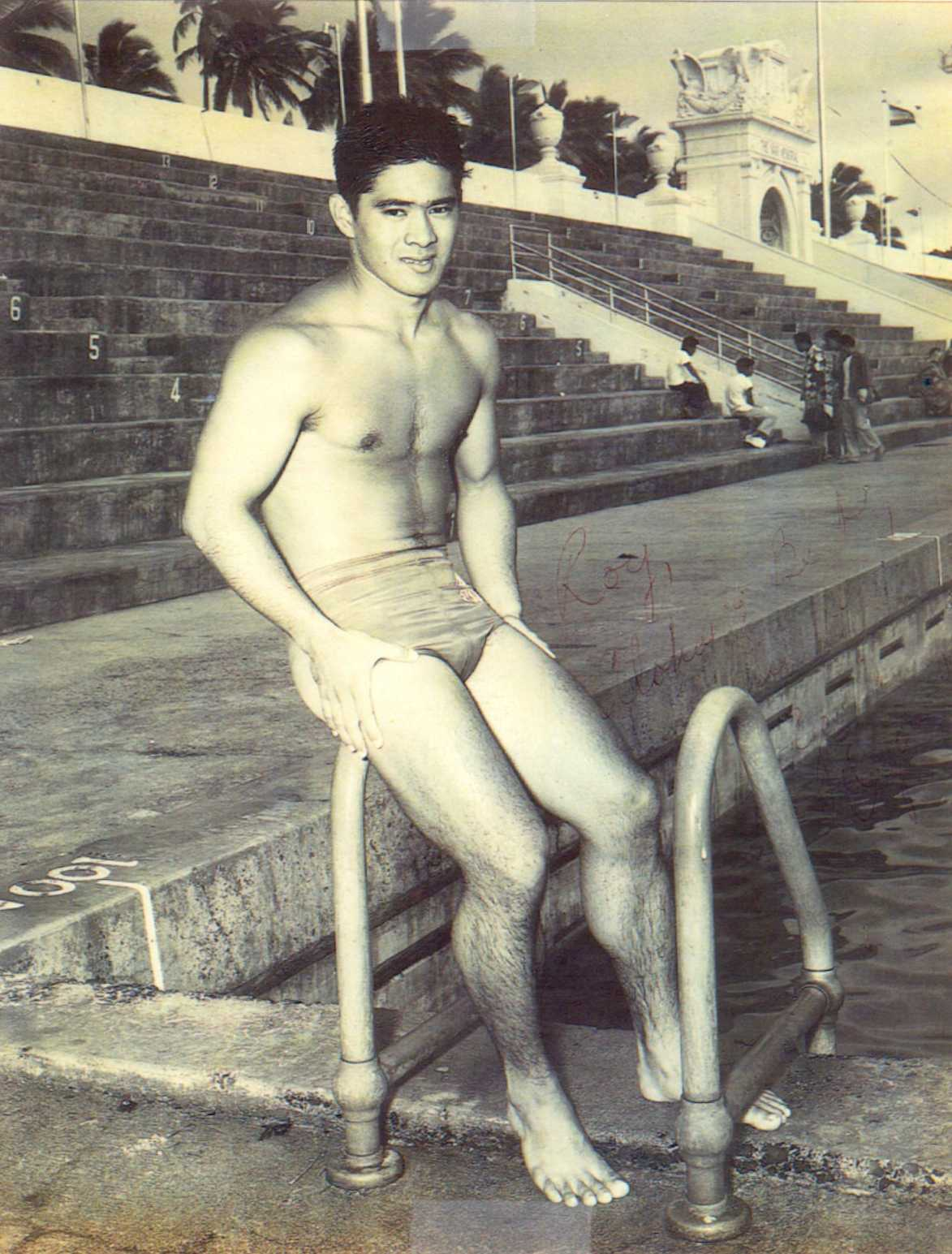
- Oyakawa at the Waikiki Natatorium War Memorial near Kaimana Beach

Personal information
- Full name: Yoshinobu Oyakawa
- Nickname: "Yoshi"
- National team: United States
- Born: August 9, 1933 (age 93) Kona, Territory of Hawaii, U.S.
- Height: 5 ft 7 in (1.70 m)
- Weight: 154 lb (70 kg)

Sport
- Sport: Swimming
- Strokes: Backstroke
- Club: Hawaii Swim Club; Hilo Aquatic Club
- College team: Ohio State University
- Coach: Mike Peppe (Ohio State); Charles "Sparky" Kawamoto (Hilo Aquatic Club)
Medal record
Men's swimming
Representing the United States
Olympic Games
Gold medal – first place	1952 Helsinki	100 m backstroke
Representing Ohio State
NCAA
Gold medal – first place	1952 Princeton	Team event
Gold medal – first place	1952 Princeton	200 yard backstroke
Gold medal – first place	1953 Columbus	100 yard backstroke
Gold medal – first place	1953 Columbus	200 yard backstroke
Gold medal – first place	1953 Columbus	300 yard medley relay
Gold medal – first place	1954 Syracuse	Team title
Gold medal – first place	1954 Syracuse	100 yard backstroke
Gold medal – first place	1954 Syracuse	200 yard backstroke
Gold medal – first place	1954 Syracuse	300 yard medley relay
Gold medal – first place	1955 Oxford	Team title
Gold medal – first place	1955 Oxford	100 yard backstroke
Gold medal – first place	1955 Oxford	200 yard backstroke
Gold medal – first place	1955 Oxford	300 yard medley relay

Yoshinobu Oyakawa (Japanese: 親川 義信, born August 9, 1933) is an American former competition swimmer, 1952 Olympic champion, and former world record-holder in the 100-meter backstroke. He is considered to be the last of the great "straight-arm-pull" backstrokers. He still holds the world record in this technique.

Oyakawa was born in Kona, Hawaii to the Rev. and Mrs. Edward Oyakawa and raised in Papaikou. He has an older sister, Dorothy, and an older brother, Ensie Michio. Oyakawa may have done his earliest swimming in Pake Pond in Papaikou. He first attended East Honolulu's Kalanianaole High School, known as Kalani High School prior to Hilo High School in the Southeast Central coastal portion of the island of Hawaii. A 1951 graduate, he began competitive swimming as a Sophomore at Hilo High around 1948 under Coach Charles Kiyoishi "Sparky" Kawamoto at the Hilo Aquatic Club. He won his first Hawaiian 100-meter AAU backstroke championship swimming for the Hilo Club in 1950, and repeated in 1951. His 1951 100-meter backstroke time of 1:07.5 in the Hawaiian AAU meet was America's best that year in a long course pool.

== College ==
Beginning in the Fall of 1951, Oyakawa attended Ohio State University under a swimming scholarship, under Head Coach Mike Peppe, along with 1952 Olympic medalist, and former Honolulu's McKinley High School swimmer Ford Konno. While at Ohio State, Oyakawa won six Big Ten, seven NCAA, and nine NAAU championships. After graduating Ohio State in March, 1956, Oyakawa enrolled in the U.S. Air Force.

== Olympics ==
Oyakawa placed fourth in the 200-meter backstroke at the National AAU Indoor Meet. But on July 5, 1952, at the more significant Olympics trials in New York, he swam an Olympic record time of 1:05.7 in the 100-meter backstroke finals, bettering the old record by .2 seconds and finishing ahead of the entire field of American trial competitors.

Travelling with the U.S. team later in July, he represented the United States at the 1952 Summer Olympics in Helsinki, Finland, where as a strong favorite he won the gold medal in the 100-meter backstroke event, breaking the fifteen-year standing record of American Adolph Kiefer, which had been set in 1936. In a close race, he swam a 1:05.4, finishing .8 seconds ahead of the French team's silver medalist Gilbert Bozon, and 1 second ahead of America's bronze medalist Jack Taylor.

He returned to Olympic competition at the 1956 Summer Olympics in Melbourne, Australia, where he was elected co-captain along with Ford Konno. He finished 8th in the 100-meter backstroke competition.

== Coaching ==
Oyakawa became a teacher and coached swimming at Oak Hills High School from 1960 to 1985. He led Oak Hills to 23 conference championships and was named League Coach of the Year 23 times and Southwest Ohio Swimming Coach of the Year 12 times.

== Honors ==
- Yoshinobu Oyakawa Day proclaimed by Big Island County Chairman James Kealoha on September 12, 1952
- International Swimming Hall of Fame, 1973
- Ohio High School Coach of the Year, 1972
- The Ohio State University Athletics Hall of Fame, 1978
- Hawaiʻi Sports Hall of Fame, 1998
- Oak Hills Athletic Hall of Fame, 2008

== See also ==
- List of members of the International Swimming Hall of Fame
- List of Ohio State University people
- List of Olympic medalists in swimming (men)

Records
Preceded by Gilbert Bozon	Men's 100-meter backstroke world record-holder (long course); April 1, 1954 – February 27, 1955	Succeeded by Gilbert Bozon
