= Tim Jecko =

American swimmer (1938–2005)

- Jecko as a Naval Ensign, circa 1961

Personal information
- Full name: Perry Timothy Jecko
- Nickname: "Tim"
- National team: United States
- Born: January 24, 1938 Washington, D.C., U.S.
- Died: January 11, 2005 (aged 66) Madison, New Jersey, U.S.
- Education: Yale University B.A. (1959); M.A. Fine Arts (1968)
- Height: 6 ft 1 in (1.85 m)
- Weight: 161 lb (73 kg)
- Spouse: Jo Ann
- Children: 3

Sport
- Sport: Swimming
- Strokes: Freestyle
- Club: Walter Reed Swim Club; Ambassador Swim Club; Edgemoor Country Club; New Haven Swim Club
- College team: Yale University
- Coach: Jim Campbell (Walter Reed); Robert J. H. Kiphuth (Yale); Bob Muir ('56 Olympics)
Medal record
Representing Yale
NCAA
| Gold medal – first place | 1957 Chapel Hill | 100 yard butterfly |
| Gold medal – first place | 1957 Chapel Hill | 200 yard butterfly |
| Gold medal – first place | 1957 Chapel Hill | 200 yard individual medley |

Perry Timothy Jecko (January 24, 1938 – January 11, 2005) was an American competition swimmer who competed for Yale, and represented the United States at the 1956 Summer Olympics in Melbourne, Australia. After graduating Yale, he served in the Navy, worked as an actor in live theater and television and taught at the High School and collegiate level.

== Early life and swimming ==
Timothy Jecko was born January 4, 1938 in Washington, D.C. to father Perry Joseph and mother Cora Timothy Jecko. He began swimming in the pool at the Walter Reed Army Medical Center in Washington, D.C., where he trained and competed with an Amateur Athletic Union team. He attended and swam for Leland Junior High Swimming Squad under Coach Al Hobelman. Moving to Bethesda, Maryland around 1947-8, Jecko swam with the Edgemoor Country Club team where he was coached by Al Hobleman, with the team also managed and coached by Jecko's father who helped start the club team around 1948. Jecko had begun taking swim lessons at the Edgemoor pool by the age of nine. Tim later attended Bethesda Chevy Chase High School through around his Junior year. He swam with the Ambassador Swimming Club at the Ambassador Hotel in Washington, D.C. by age eleven, and swam for Jim Leonard Campbell as part of the Walter Reed team in greater Washington D.C. at least by the age of 14, breaking a world age group record for 14-year olds in the 100-meter freestyle as a Junior Olympian. He credited Campbell, who began as a physical therapist at Walter Reed before becoming a swim coach and later coached swimming at the University of Pennsylvania, as the most important and influential coach of his early career.

He later received an athletic scholarship to Hotchkiss Prep School, originally a private boarding school in Lakeville, Connecticut that served as a feeder school for Yale, where he was enrolled by 1954 for his High School Senior year. At Hotchkiss, he acted in three school plays and had a short story published in the school periodical, foretelling two of his primary life careers. By 1952, he represented the Walter Reed Swim Club which did not officially take the name until that year. Swimming unattached at only 14, he won the 50-yard freestyle with a time of 27.7 seconds, and placed second in the men's 100-yard backstroke at an AAU meet in Washington, D.C.

== Records ==
During his swimming career, Jecko held World, NCAA, and American records. At 20, during his Junior year at Yale, he set a National and NCAA record in the 200-yard butterfly of 2:06.4 at the Eastern Collegiate Swimming League Individual Championship meet.

== Yale University ==
He swam for Yale University under Hall of Fame Head Coach Robert J. H. Kiphuth enrolling around 1956, and captained the team as an upperclassman. He graduated while taking a number of courses from the School of Drama, receiving a Bachelor's Degree in English in 1959. Jecko won the 200-yard butterfly in 2:11.8 and the 200-yard Individual Medley at the Harvard Pool in 2:08.7 at the Eastern Collegiate swimming championships. While at Yale, as shown at right, he won three individual NCAA Championships in 1957 at Chapel Hill which included first places in the 100 and 200-yard butterfly, and the 200-yard Individual Medley. Returning to Yale after spending some time in theater, he received a Masters in Fine Arts from the Yale's School of Drama in 1968.

At the 1956 Olympic trials in Detroit in August 1956, he tied for fourth in the 200-meter freestyle final with University of North Carolina swimmer Don Evans, but was selected over Evans for third place by the Judges in a close decision, qualifying him for the U.S. Olympic team, at least in the 200 relay event which required a minimum of four swimmers.

== 1956 Melbourne Olympics ==
At 18, he swam for the second-place U.S. team in the qualifying heats of the men's 4×200-meter freestyle relay of the 1956 Melbourne Olympics under U.S. Men's Olympic Head swimming Coach Bob Muir in early December. Muir would have 30-year career as a swim coach at Williams College after having coached at Harvard and MIT. Jecko did not receive a medal, however, because only relay swimmers who competed in the event final were eligible under the 1956 Olympic rules. The team from Australia won the gold with a time of 8:23.6, and the team from the Soviet Union took the bronze medal with a time of 8:34.7.

In early April, 1957, as a defending AAU champion in the 400-yard individual medley, while a Yale sophomore, he represented New Haven Swim Club coached by Bob Kiphuth, at the National AAU National Swimming Championships.

=== Naval service ===
He began a career as an Officer in the U.S. Navy around 1959-1960, serving in the seventh fleet, and practicing with a Navy swim team while training for the 1960 Olympics. He reached the rank of Lieutenant, before leaving the military around 1963.

=== Careers ===
Jecko worked as a lifeguard at the Congressional Country Club in the summer of 1954. In careers related to his acting and theater skills, he served as a Performing Arts deputy director for the Smithsonian Institution in the 1960's after completing his bachelor's degree at Yale, and later was a professor at Fairleigh Dickinson University, where he taught communication and writing. In the 1970's he taught literature to students in the Arlington, Virginia school system.

In 1983, he acted on Broadway in Woman of the Year with Debbie Reynolds. He performed in the Broadway play "Annie" with Raquel Welch. With his career not confined to live theater, he also acted in television programs such as "Knots Landing", "St. Elsewhere", and "The Doctors" and in commercials on television.

He moved from New York to Chatham, New Jersey in 1993, where he lived through 2003, before moving to Madison, New Jersey.

Jecko died Jan. 11, 2005 in Madison, N.J. while at home, and was later buried at Rock Creek cemetery in his birthplace of Washington, D.C. He was survived by his wife Jo Ann Jecko, whom he married around 1993, and three children, two boys and a girl. Around 2003, he had received a diagnosis of ALS, or Lou Gehrig's disease. He had continued swimming throughout much of his life. A memorial service was observed at the Waldron Avenue Unitarian Church in Summit, New Jersey at mid-day on January 29, and on February 12 at St. John's Church in Chevy Chase, Maryland, closer to his birthplace.

== See also ==
- List of Yale University people
