= Ronald Gora =

American swimmer (1933–2014)

Ron Gora
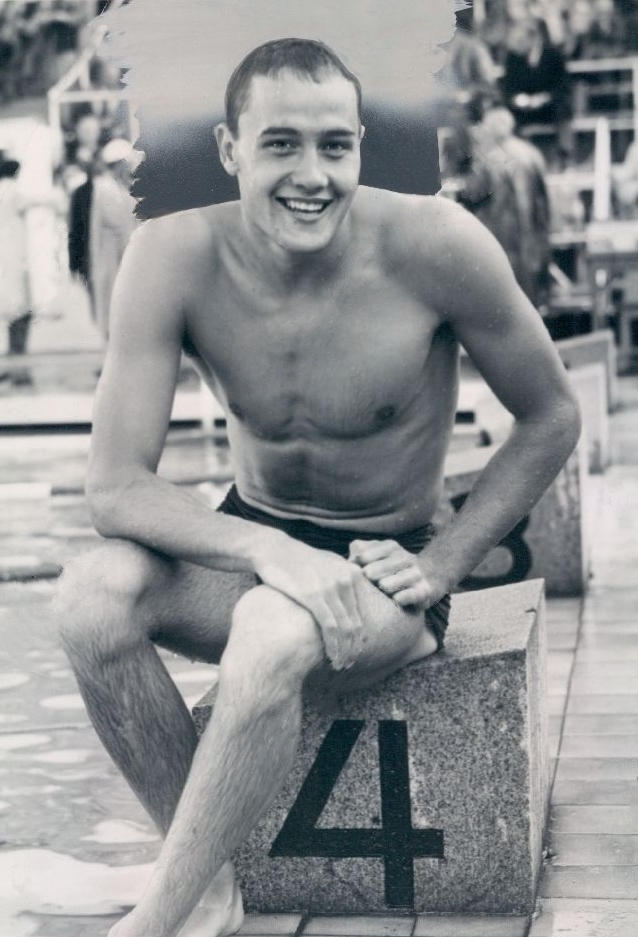
- Gora in 1953

Personal information
- Full name: Ronald Francis Gora
- Nicknames: "Ron," "Ronnie"
- National team: United States
- Born: July 10, 1933 Chicago, Illinois, U.S.
- Died: March 11, 2014 (aged 80) Durand, Michigan, U.S.
- Spouse: Maria Käppeler (1963)

Sport
- Sport: Swimming
- Strokes: Freestyle
- College team: University of Michigan
Medal record
Representing the United States
Pan American Games
| Gold medal – first place | 1951 Buenos Aires | 4×200 m freestyle |
| Silver medal – second place | 1951 Buenos Aires | 100 m freestyle |
Representing Michigan
NCAA
| Gold medal – first place | 1953 Columbus | 400 yard freestyle relay |
| Gold medal – first place | 1954 Syracuse | 400 yard freestyle relay |

Ronald Francis Gora (July 10, 1933 – March 11, 2014) was an American competition swimmer who competed in the 1952 Helsinki Olympics and was a Pan American Games champion.

Gora was born in Chicago, Illinois on July 10, 1933, and attended Lane Tech High School. He remains tied with Tom Jager and Brian Alden for the second most individual high school state championships won by a male in Illinois.

== University of Michigan ==
He attended the University of Michigan, and swam for the Michigan Wolverines swimming and diving team in National Collegiate Athletic Association (NCAA) competition from 1952 to 1954. He was a member of Michigan's NCAA national championship teams in the 400-yard freestyle relay in 1953 and 1954.

Gora won a gold medal in the 4×200-meter freestyle relay event at the 1951 Pan American Games in Buenos Aires, Argentina, alongside Dick Cleveland, Burwell Jones and Bill Heusner. Individually, he also received a Pan American Games silver medal for his second-place finish in the 100-meter freestyle.

== 1952 Helsinki Olympics ==
Gora again represented the United States at the 1952 Summer Olympics in Helsinki, Finland, where he finished eighth in the final of the men's 100-meter freestyle with a time of 58.8 seconds.

=== Family ===
Gora had four sisters. On November 16, 1963, he married Maria Käppeler, they had one daughter and two sons. Gora had 2 daughters and 2 son's from a previous marriage.

== See also ==
- List of University of Michigan alumni
