= 1953 NCAA swimming and diving championships =

American college aquatic sports competition

1953 NCAA swimming and diving Championships
- Host city: Columbus, Ohio
- Date(s): March 1953
- Venue(s): Ohio State Natatorium; Ohio State University
- Teams: 24
- Events: 14

The 1953 NCAA swimming and diving championships were contested in March 1953 at the Ohio State Natatorium at the Ohio State University in Columbus, Ohio at the 17th annual NCAA-sanctioned swim meet to determine the team and individual national champions of men's collegiate swimming and diving among its member programs in the United States.

Yale topped hosts, and defending national champions, Ohio State in the team standings to capture the Bulldogs' fourth national title (and second title in three years).

== Team standings ==
- (H) = Hosts
- (DC) = Defending champions
- Italics = Debut appearance

Rank	Team	Points
1st place, gold medalist(s)	Yale	96 1/2
2nd place, silver medalist(s)	Ohio State (H, DC)	73 1/2
3rd place, bronze medalist(s)	Michigan	39
4	Stanford	23
5	Michigan State	14
5	North Carolina	14
7	Illinois	10
8	Georgia	8
9	Williams	7
10	Dartmouth	6
10	Oklahoma	6
12	Army	5
12	NC State	5
12	Washington	5
15	Beloit	4
15	Harvard	4
15	Springfield	4
15	Texas	4
19	Pittsburgh	3
19	Purdue	3
19	USC	3
22	Navy	2
23	Iowa	1
23	Wisconsin	1

== Individual events ==
=== Swimming ===
Event	Champion	Team	Time
50 yard freestyle	Don Hill	Michigan	22.4
100 yard freestyle	Reid Patterson	Georgia	50.5
220 yard freestyle	Jimmy McLane	Yale	2:06.9
440 yard freestyle	Wayne Moore	Yale	4:37.0
1,500 meter freestyle	Jimmy McLane	Yale	18:27.5
100 yard backstroke	Yoshi Oyakawa	Ohio State	56.9
200 yard backstroke	Yoshi Oyakawa (DC)	Ohio State	2:05.1
100 yard butterfly	Robert Clemons	Illinois	1:00.7
200 yard butterfly	Gerald Holan	Ohio State	2:14.0
150 yard individual medley	Burwell Jones (DC)	Michigan	1:30.0
400 yard freestyle relay	Ronald Gora; Burwell Jones; Thomas Benner; Donald Hill	Michigan (DC)	3:24.0
300 yard medley relay	Yoshi Oyakawa; Gerald Holan; Dick Cleveland	Ohio State	2:47.2

=== Diving ===
Event	Champion	Team	Score
1 meter diving	Jerry Harrison	Ohio State	485.75
3 meter diving	Bob Clotworthy	Ohio State	525.8

== See also ==
- List of college swimming and diving teams
