= Rex Aubrey =

Australian swimmer (1935–2021)

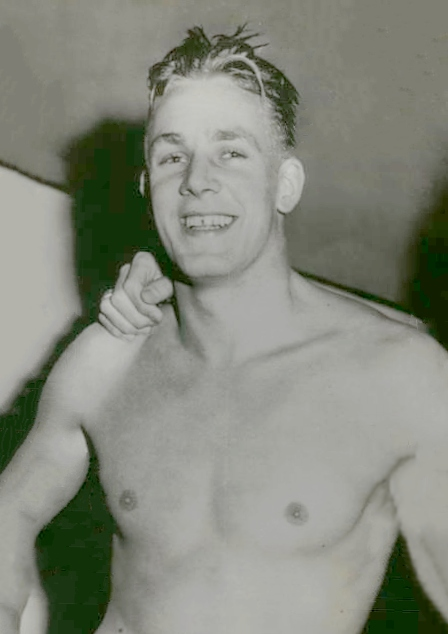
- Aubrey at an NCAA meet in 1956

Personal information
- Born: 4 February 1935 Parkes, New South Wales, Australia
- Died: 20 April 2021 (aged 86) West Bloomfield Township, Michigan, United States of America

Sport
- Sport: Swimming
- Strokes: Freestyle
- Club: Parkes Swimming Club
Medal record
Representing Australia
British Empire and Commonwealth Games
Gold medal – first place	1954 Vancouver	4×220 yd freestyle
Bronze medal – third place	1954 Vancouver	110 yd freestyle
Representing Yale
NCAA
Gold medal – first place	1955 Oxford	100 yard freestyle
Gold medal – first place	1955 Oxford	400 yard freestyle relay
Gold medal – first place	1956 Ann Arbor	50 yard freestyle
Gold medal – first place	1956 Ann Arbor	300 yard medley relay
Gold medal – first place	1957 Chapel Hill	400 yard freestyle relay

Rex Aubrey (4 February 1935 – 20 April 2021) was an Australian freestyle swimmer. He competed in the 100 m and 4 × 200 m relay events at the 1952 Olympics and finished sixth in the 100 m individual event. Two years later he won two medals at the 1954 British Empire and Commonwealth Games.
