= Swimming at the 1955 Pan American Games – Men's 200 metre butterfly =

Men's 200 metre butterfly at the 1955 Pan American Games
- Venue: -
- Dates: March 25 (preliminaries and finals)

Medalists
Gold medal	Eulalio Ríos	Mexico
Silver medal	Walter Ocampo	Mexico
Bronze medal	William Yorzyk	United States

The men's 200 metre butterfly competition of the swimming events at the 1955 Pan American Games took place on 25 March. It was the first appearance of this event in the Pan American Games.

This race consisted of four lengths of the pool, all lengths being in butterfly stroke.

== Results ==
All times are in minutes and seconds.

KEY:	q	Fastest non-qualifiers	Q	Qualified	GR	Games record	NR	National record	PB	Personal best	SB	Seasonal best

=== Final ===
The final was held on March 25.

Rank	Name	Nationality	Time	Notes
1st place, gold medalist(s)	Eulalio Ríos	Mexico	2:39.8	
2nd place, silver medalist(s)	Walter Ocampo	Mexico	2:40.3	
3rd place, bronze medalist(s)	William Yorzyk	United States	2:42.5	
4	Jack Nelson	United States	2:43.6	
5	Orlando Cossani	Argentina	2:46.5	
6	F.Gutierrez	Mexico	2:48.4	
7	-	-	-	
8	-	-	-	
