= Dick Kimball =

American diver and diving coach (1934/1935–2026)

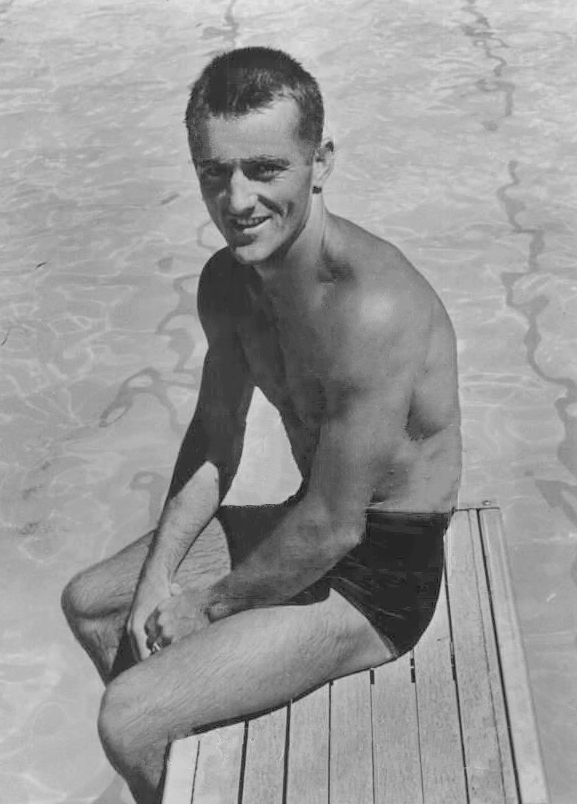
- Kimball in 1969

Personal information
- Full name: Richard Kimball
- Born: May 14, 1935 Rochester, Minnesota, U.S.
- Died: April 25, 2026 (aged 90)

Sport
- Sport: Diving
- College team: University of Oklahoma; University of Michigan
Medal record
Representing Michigan
NCAA
Gold medal – first place	1957 Chapel Hill	Team title
Gold medal – first place	1957 Chapel Hill	1 meter diving
Gold medal – first place	1957 Chapel Hill	3 meter diving

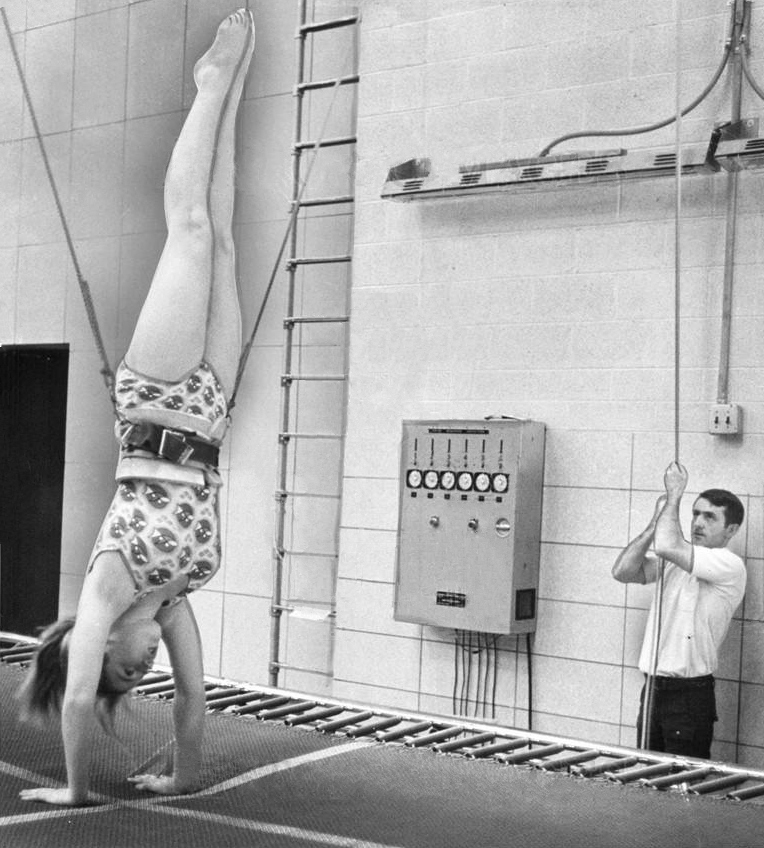
Dick Kimball training his daughter Vicki in 1976

Richard Kimball (May 14, 1935 – April 25, 2026) was an American diving champion and diving coach at the University of Michigan. He was the NCAA springboard champion in 1957 and the Professional World Diving champion in 1963. He coached the University of Michigan diving team from 1958 to 2002 and also coached the U.S. Olympic diving teams in 1964, 1980, 1984, 1988 and 1992. He has been inducted into the International Swimming Hall of Fame and the University of Michigan Athletic Hall of Honor.

== Competitive diving and trampolining ==
Kimball was born in Rochester, Minnesota on May 14, 1935, and was the Minnesota high school diving champion four straight years from 1952 to 1956. In 1956, Kimball helped lead the Rochester Rockets to the Minnesota AAU outdoor swimming championship. After graduating from high school, Kimball spent one year at the University of Oklahoma before transferring to Michigan. Kimball was a member of three NCAA champion swimming and diving teams at Michigan from 1957 to 1959. In 1957, he won the NCAA championships in both the one-meter and three-meter springboard events. Kimball's two first-place finishes accounted for 24 of Michigan's 69 points, and were the key to Michigan's 69–61 victory over Yale in the 1957 NCAA championship held at Chapel Hill, North Carolina. The Associated Press reported: "Poised, acrobatic Dick Kimball of Michigan won both the low and high board events." Another account noted: Michigan stood at the top of national collegiate swimming teams today thanks to its divers, a great medley relay team and Yale's failure to qualify more men." Kimball received his bachelor's degree from U-M in 1959 and his master's degree in 1960.

While at Michigan, Kimball also competed on the gymnastics team under Coach Newt Loken and won the national trampoline title. He won the Professional World Diving championship in 1963. He also finished as the runner-up at the World Acrobatic Diving Championships.

== Comedy and acrobatic diving shows ==
In the early 1960s, Kimball toured with Hobie Billingsley, also a Big Ten diving coach at the time, in a "comedy and acrobatic show" of diving. In 1960 and again in 1962, Billingsley and Kimball took time off from coaching to serve the U.S. State Department "as goodwill ambassadors" touring the world. They gave over 1,000 performances on their 1962 world tour and also appeared on television shows including Ed Sullivan's Toast of the Town, Sports Spectacular and You Asked For It. When Kimball and Billingsley performed at the 1962 Annual Swimming Carnival at Yale, The Bridgeport Post reported: "Two of the world's greatest divers – between them holders of scores of high board championships – will be among the host of talented performers . . . They are Dick Kimball and Hobie Billingsley who have teamed together to form the world's foremost acrobatic and comedy diving team. . . . [Kimball] is regarded as the world's greatest acrobatic diver." A 1960 newspaper account said the Billingsley and Kimball show featured "high diving from atop a 30-foot tower, rhythmic swimming, fancy diving and comedy acts."

== Diving coach ==
=== University of Michigan coach ===
He was the coach of the Michigan Wolverines diving team for 44 years from 1959 to 2002. Kimball's teams won seven Big Ten Conference championships and four NCAA championships. Four of Kimball's divers won Olympic gold medals: Bob Webster in 1960 and 1964, Micki King in 1972, Phil Boggs in 1976, and Mark Lenzi (1992). He also coached Dick Rydze to a silver medal in 1972 (Munich) and son Bruce Kimball to a silver medal in 1984 (Los Angeles). In addition he coached Ron Merriott and Chris Seufert to bronze medals in 1984 (Los Angeles). Many more divers were coached by Kimball to spots on the Olympic teams for The USA, England, Canada, Uruguay. Three others won individual NCAA championships: Matthew Chelich (1-meter in 1977; 3-meter in 1979); Ronald Merriott (3-meter in 1982), and Kent Ferguson (3-meter in 1984). The Wolverines also won two NCAA team diving championships under Kimball. He also coached three Big Ten Conference women's divers of the year: Diane Dudeck (1984), Mary Fishback (1988), and Carrie Zarse (1995).

Kimball was the first to put a spotting rig over a diving board. He developed many new dives, including many of the dives in today's optional list. He also developed the technique in spotting called "tipping". Over a very long career he shared his techniques and ideas with anyone who wished to learn them.

=== Pioneer in training women at Michigan ===
In the years before Title IX, women were not permitted to compete in University of Michigan athletics, but Kimball circumvented the system in the 1960s to train two women, Micki King and Lani Loken (the daughter of U-M gymnastics coach Newt Loken), with the men's team. Kimball taught King and Loken to do a complete men's list off the women's tower. King recalled, “One of Coach Kimball's greatest lines was that he didn't coach men or women, he coached people. He taught me dives that no woman had ever done before. I pioneered those dives. Coach Kimball knew that we were a team of people.” King also recalled: "We used the women's pool at the CCRB. What was ironic was that the men were allowed to come into and use the women's pool but the women couldn't even come into the men's. What Kimball would do was sneak us through the back doors because the front door was right in front of the administrators. We used the spectator bathroom and used washcloths and the public sink as a shower. We thought we were lucky." King became the dominant woman diver in the United States under Kimball's coaching, winning ten national championships between 1965 and 1972. Kimball coached women divers at the University of Michigan free for 17 years before Title IX because he felt women deserved the same opportunities as men to dive in college.

=== Olympic team coach ===
In 1964, Kimball was named coach of the U.S. Olympic diving team after Texas coach Henry Chapman suffered a heart attack. As the games got underway, Kimball said: "We have the strongest 3-meter team ever assembled, and apparently the strongest 10-meter squad. The United States has dominated Olympic diving more than any other sport and we will not lose that dominance this time." Kimball's prediction proved correct as the US team (including Michigan's Bob Webster) won three gold medals and 8 of 12 medals awarded in diving at the 1964 Olympics. He was also the coach of the U.S. Olympic diving teams in 1980, 1984, 1988 and 1992. The U.S. team ended up boycotting the 1980 Games in Moscow, and the 1984 games in Los Angeles proved to be Kimball's proudest moment. The U.S. diving team again won 8 of 12 medals in diving at the 1984 Olympics, including two gold medals for Greg Louganis, a silver medal for Kimball's son, Bruce Kimball, and a bronze medal for Michigan diver, Ronald Merriott. In the 1988 Olympics diving competition, Louganis again won two gold medals, but the Chinese team collected six medals, one more than the U.S. team. The Chinese team won the medal count in the 1992 games as well, despite a gold medal for Kimball's pupil Mark Lenzi.

=== Retirement after 43 years as Michigan's coach ===
When Kimball retired in 2002, he was the last member of the U-M athletic staff who had been hired by athletic director Fritz Crisler. He said at the time, "Michigan has been a fantastic place for me. My whole life revolves around the University. It's been a great school, the people are tremendous and I've really enjoyed my experiences here." He also noted, "I'd keep coaching if it weren't for the recruiting and scheduling. It puts you on the road every day. Coaching is the fun part. It's all the other things that go along with it that make it difficult." Kimball said he still planned to run diving clinics, swim 1,000 yards, roller-blade and ice skate every day. Kimball served as volunteer assistant diving coach for 8 years following his official retirement.

=== Other contributions ===
Kimball served as the president of the American Diving Coaches Association, and was a member of the US Diving Olympic Committee and the Rules Committee of US Diving.

== Personal life and death ==
Kimball and his wife, Gail, had three children. Their son, Bruce Kimball, won a silver medal in the 10-meter platform event at the 1984 Summer Olympics. Their son Jim Kimball was a drummer. Their daughter, Vicki Kimball, is the current head dive coach at Ann Arbor Pioneer High School.

Kimball died on April 25, 2026, at the age of 90.

== Awards and honors ==
During 50 years as a diver and diving coach, Kimball received numerous honors and awards, including the following:

- In 1972, he received the "Mike Malone Memorial Award," given for outstanding contributions to diving by the national governing body of the sport, U.S. Diving.
- He was named the NCAA Men's Diving Coach of the Year in 1984 and the Women's Diving Coach of the Year in 1988.
- He received the Fred Cady Memorial award following the 1972, 1976 and 1992 Summer Olympic games for his "sincere dedication in achieving the ultimate in coaching the sport of diving."
- Kimball was inducted into the University of Michigan Athletic Hall of Honor in 1985.
- In 2000, Kimball received the University of Michigan's Bob Ufer Award. Since 1981, the Ufer Award has been presented each year to a Letterwinners "M" Club member in recognition of his or her outstanding service to the University of Michigan Athletic Program.
- He was inducted into the International Swimming Hall of Fame in 1985, and in 2002 he was awarded the Paragon Award by the International Swimming Hall of Fame.
- In 1986, he became the first diving coach to receive the Collegiate and Scholastic Swimming Trophy from the College Swimming Coaches Association of America (CSCAA).

== See also ==
- List of members of the International Swimming Hall of Fame
