= Albert Wiggins =

American swimmer (1935–2011)

Personal information
- Full name: Albert Marcus Wiggins Jr.
- Nickname: Al
- National team: United States
- Born: May 27, 1935 Pittsburgh, Pennsylvania
- Died: June 1, 2011 (aged 76) Pittsburgh, Pennsylvania
- Height: 6 ft 3.5 in (1.92 m)
- Weight: 201 lb (91 kg)

Sport
- Sport: Swimming
- Strokes: Backstroke, butterfly, freestyle
- College team: Ohio State University
Medal record
Representing Ohio State
NCAA
Gold medal – first place	1955 Oxford	Team title
Gold medal – first place	1955 Oxford	150 yard individual medley
Gold medal – first place	1955 Oxford	300 yard medley relay
Gold medal – first place	1956 Ann Arbor	Team title
Gold medal – first place	1956 Ann Arbor	200 yard individual medley

Albert Marcus Wiggins Jr. (May 27, 1935 – June 1, 2011) was the first American swimmer to win Amateur Athletic Union (AAU) national championships in three strokes: butterfly, backstroke and freestyle. He set four world records in the 100-meter and 100-yard butterfly, and in total won eight AAU titles. He also participated in the 1956 Summer Olympics and finished seventh in the 100-meter backstroke event. Although he was recognized as a world top medley swimmer, this event became Olympic only in 1964.

== Biography ==
Wiggins was born in Pittsburgh, Pennsylvania, the son of a vice president of Westinghouse Air Brake Company. He attended Allderdice High School and then Ohio State University, where he trained under the 1952 Olympic coach Mike Peppe. Although he was tall and well-built, Wiggins was shortsighted from a young age and wore glasses; he therefore avoided sports requiring physical contact and chose swimming instead. He started training at a club at age 13. Although he was interested in backstroke, this discipline was then dominated by Yoshi Oyakawa, which led Wiggins to explore other styles.

Wiggins swam for Team USA in the 1956 Olympics in Melbourne, AUS. He retired from competition at age 22 to pursue a career in law, and, after graduating from Harvard Law School, returned to Pittsburgh to work at Reed Smith Shaw & McClay. He was married, but divorced in the late 1970s and remarried Hollis Wiggins, a colleague from Reed Smith Shaw & McClay. The couple established a private firm Wiggins-Garfield Associates and worked in the field of tax and estate law. Wiggins retired from practicing law in 2001. He continued to swim through most of his life, mostly in his private pool, but avoided masters competitions.

He died in Pittsburgh, aged 76, from an aortic dissection after a morning swim. He was survived by his wife, and three children: daughters Susan Wiggins and Rhiana Wiggins from the first marriage, and son David from the second marriage.

Wiggins was inducted into the International Swimming Hall of Fame as an "Honor Swimmer" in 1994.

He appeared on the cover of Sports Illustrated in April 1956 when he was 21 years old. As of 2011, he was one of only 68 athletes to have been featured in the "Faces in the Crowd" section of the magazine and then also appear on a cover.

== See also ==
- List of Harvard Law School alumni
- List of Ohio State University people
