= Jean Stewart (swimmer) =

New Zealand swimmer (1930–2020)

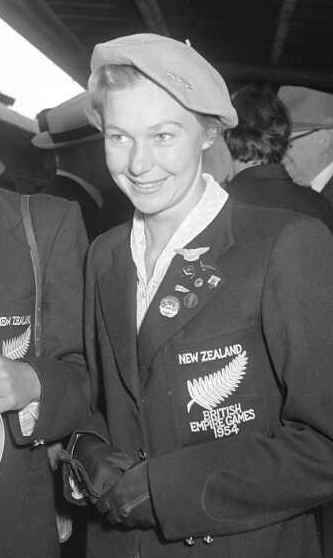
- Stewart in 1954

Personal information
- Born: Jean Stewart; 23 December 1930 Dunedin, New Zealand
- Died: 8 August 2020 (aged 89) Auckland, New Zealand
- Education: Otago Girls' High School
- Spouse: Lincoln Hurring (m. 1957; died 1993)
- Relative: Gary Hurring (son)

Sport
- Country: New Zealand
- Sport: Swimming

Achievements and titles
- National finals: 100 yds backstroke champion (1950, 1951, 1952, 1953, 1954, 1956); 220 yds backstroke champion (1950, 1951, 1952, 1953, 1954); 100 yds butterfly champion (1953)
Medal record
Women's swimming
Representing New Zealand
Olympic Games
Bronze medal – third place	1952 Helsinki	100 m backstroke
British Empire and Commonwealth Games
Silver medal – second place	1950 Auckland	110 yards backstroke
Bronze medal – third place	1954 Vancouver	110 yards backstroke

Jean Hurring (née Stewart, 23 December 1930 – 8 August 2020) was a swimmer from New Zealand. She won a bronze medal in the 100 m backstroke at the 1952 Summer Olympics.

== Biography ==
Born in Dunedin in 1930, Stewart was educated at Otago Girls' High School, and trained as a teacher at Dunedin Training College. When she was active as a swimmer, New Zealand had no swimming coach, and Stewart was mentored by Bill Wallace, who she described as an "enthusiast". Wallace had an interest in horse racing and from that, Stewart adopted interval training as an innovation. She had also set up a pulley system in her bedroom for weight training that was specific to swimming. She represented her native country at two consecutive Summer Olympics, 1952 and 1956. In 1952 she won the bronze medal in the women's 100 metres backstroke at the Helsinki Games. She shared a room in Helsinki with the only other New Zealand female competitor, Yvette Williams, who was also from Dunedin.

Stewart also won medals in the 110 yards backstroke at the Empire Games; silver in 1950 and bronze in 1954. She remains the only New Zealand woman to have won an Olympic swimming medal.

Stewart won 12 New Zealand national swimming titles: the 100 yards backstroke every year from 1950 to 1956 except 1955; the 220 yards backstroke every year from 1950 to 1954; and the 100 yards butterfly in 1953.

Stewart married fellow Dunedin swimmer Lincoln Hurring after the Helsinki Games, and they settled in Auckland. Their son is world silver medalist swimmer Gary Hurring. Hurring later lived in a retirement village in Takapuna on Auckland's North Shore. Her son keeps her Olympic medal.

Stewart is one of eight New Zealand pool swimmers who have been inducted into the New Zealand Sports Hall of Fame and the only one who did not win a gold medal at either the Olympics or at Commonwealth Games.

Stewart died in Auckland on 8 August 2020 at the age of 89.

== See also ==
- List of Olympic medalists in swimming (women)
