= Gary Hurring =

New Zealand swimmer (born 1961)

Personal information
- Born: Gary Norman Hurring; 10 October 1961 (age 64) Auckland, New Zealand
- Height: 192 cm (6 ft 4 in)
- Weight: 85 kg (187 lb)
- Relative(s): Lincoln Hurring (father); Jean Stewart (mother)
Medal record
Men's swimming
Representing New Zealand
Commonwealth Games
Gold medal – first place	1978 Edmonton	200 m backstroke
World Championships (LC)
Silver medal – second place	1978 Berlin	200 m backstroke

Gary Norman Hurring (born 10 October 1961 in Auckland) is a former swimmer from New Zealand, who won the gold medal at the 1978 Commonwealth Games in the men's 200 metres backstroke. He gained silver in the same event at the 1978 World Aquatics Championships.

Hurring was considered a possible medallist for the 1980 Summer Olympics but was denied the opportunity due to the boycott by the majority of New Zealand Olympic sports associations. At the 1984 Summer Olympics he just missed medals in both backstroke events finishing fourth in the 100m and fifth in the 200m.

Hurring was appointed New Zealand swim team coach at the 2012 Summer Olympics.

Hurring is the son of two former Olympic backstroke swimmers, Lincoln Hurring and Jean Stewart; his mother won the bronze medal in the women's 100 metres backstroke at the 1952 Summer Olympics in Helsinki, Finland.

== See also ==
- List of Commonwealth Games medallists in swimming (men)
