= Fletcher Gilders =

American diver and coach (1931–2018)

Personal information
- Born: 1931 Detroit, Michigan, U.S.
- Died: September 1, 1998 Ahmic Harbor, Ontario, Canada

Sport
- Sport: Diving
- College team: Ohio State University
Medal record
Representing Ohio State
NCAA
| Gold medal – first place | 1954 Syracuse | Team title |
| Gold medal – first place | 1954 Syracuse | 1 meter diving |
| Gold medal – first place | 1955 Oxford | Team title |
| Gold medal – first place | 1955 Oxford | 1 meter diving |

Fletcher Gilders (1931–1999) was a Detroit native who won fame as a multi-sport athlete for the Colts of Northwestern High School and the Buckeyes of Ohio State University. Following his career, Gilders earned distinction as a highly successful collegiate swimming and diving coach.

== Detroit and Columbus sports headliner ==
In 1948, Fletcher Gilders was voted Michigan High School Track and Field Athlete of the Year; later that summer, the versatile Gilders competed as a springboard diver at the U.S. Olympic Team Trials in Detroit. The following year, Fletcher Gilders highlighted his senior season with a national interscholastic pole vault record of 13' 3"; he was fast becoming one of the top all-around athletes in America.

Upon graduating from Northwestern High, Gilders joined the U.S. military; serving until 1953, Fletcher later enrolled at the Ohio State University. At OSU, Gilders won back-to-back (1954 & 1955) NCAA titles on the one-meter springboard. During each of his three seasons at Ohio State, Gilders led the Buckeyes to Big Ten Conference and NCAA swimming and diving team titles. He set an NCAA Division I record that stood until overturned by Greg Louganis. Fletcher Gilders was also a member of the OSU track & field, gymnastics and soccer teams; winning a total of 10 varsity letters to become the first four-sport letterman in Ohio State's modern history. During the summer of 1956, Gilders joined younger sister (Barbara Sue) at the Melbourne Olympic Games.

== Coaching accolades ==
Upon retirement from athletics, Fletcher Gilders enjoyed a noteworthy career as a swimming and diving coach at Ohio University and Kenyon College. Coach Gilders guided the OU Bobcats for more than a quarter-century (1959–1984); winning five Mid-American Conference team titles along the way. An annual trophy given to the fastest Men's 800 Free Relay at the Mid-American Conference Championships is named after Fletcher Gilders.

At Kenyon, during the 1980s and 90s, Gilders and his athletes won 14 consecutive North Coast Athletic Conference championships and eight individual NCAA Division III diving titles; Gilders would also earn NCAA-D3 Coach of the Year honors on three occasions.

For many summers in the later part of his life, Coach Gilders worked in Canada at Camp Ak-o-mak and Camp Chikopi.

Gilders is an inductee to the Athletic Hall of Fame at Ohio State University, Ohio University, and Kenyon College.

In 2021, Gilders was named to the College Swimming & Diving Coaches Association of America's (CSCAA) 100 Greatest College Swimming & Diving Coaches of the past 100 years list.

== Family athletes ==
Gilders is the older brother of Barbara Gilders-Dudeck, a 1956 Olympic Games finalist in the three-meter springboard diving event; she finished a half-point from the bronze medal. He is the father of Professor Roger Gilders, a notable All-American collegiate track and field athlete during the late 1970s. Roger Gilders still holds the varsity record in the pole vault at his alma mater, Ohio University.

Fletcher's grand daughter (Roger's niece), Calah Young (née Gilders) is the former school record holder in the pole vault at both Ohio University and Louisiana State University.
