= David Hawkins (swimmer) =

Australian swimmer (1933–2020)

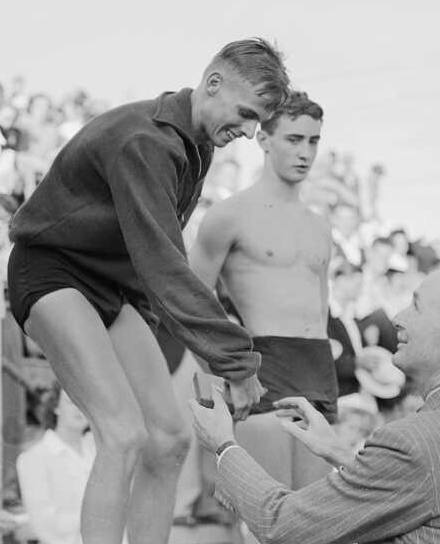
- Hawkins (left) at the 1950 British Empire Games

Personal information
- Full name: David Frederick Hawkins
- National team: Australia
- Born: 13 December 1933 Manly, New South Wales, Australia
- Died: 5 November 2020 (aged 86) Boston, Massachusetts, United States

Sport
- Sport: Swimming
- Strokes: Breaststroke, freestyle
- College team: Harvard University (US)
Medal record
Representing Australia
British Empire Games
Gold medal – first place	1950 Auckland	220 yd breaststroke
Gold medal – first place	1954 Vancouver	4×220 yd freestyle
Gold medal – first place	1954 Vancouver	3×110 yd medley
Representing Harvard
NCAA
Gold medal – first place	1954 Syracuse	100 yard butterfly
Gold medal – first place	1954 Syracuse	200 yard butterfly

David Frederick Hawkins (13 December 1933 – 5 November 2020) was an Australian world-class competition swimmer who won three gold medals at the British Empire Games in 1950 and 1954. At the 1952 Summer Olympics he reached the semifinals of the 200-metre breaststroke event.

Hawkins was the Lovett-Learned Professor of Business Administration, Emeritus, at the Harvard Business School.

== Athletic career ==
Hawkins was born in Manly New South Wales, Australia on 13 December 1933, the only child of Heather and Gordon Hawkins. He attended North Sydney Boys' High School. While in high school, he swam for Australia in the 1950 British Empire Games (now Commonwealth Games) where he won the 220 yards Breaststroke championship. Subsequently, in the 1951 Australian Swimming Championships, Hawkins won the 220 yards orthodox breaststroke championship and, swimming butterfly breaststroke, the 220 yards breaststroke championship.

In 1952, he was selected to swim for Australia in the Olympics held in Helsinki, Finland. After finishing tenth in the 220 yards breaststroke, Hawkins went to the United States for his university education, attending Harvard College in Cambridge, Massachusetts. While at Harvard, as a freshman, he won the 1953 United States national indoor 100 yards breaststroke and the 220 outdoor breaststroke championships. At the time, freshmen were not allowed to compete in National Collegiate Athletic Association (NCAA) championship events. Subsequently, as a Harvard sophomore, Hawkins won the 1954 NCAA 100 yards and 200 yards breaststroke championships.

In 1954, swimming butterfly, Hawkins won the AAU National 100 yards indoor butterfly championship. In 1954, Hawkins swam for Australia in the 1954 British Empire and Commonwealth Games held in Vancouver, Canada. At the Games, he won two gold medals swimming the orthodox breaststroke leg of the winning 3×110-yard medley relay and a freestyle leg of the winning 4×220 yards freestyle relay.

In 1955, Hawkins retired from world-class competitive swimming to concentrate on his studies at Harvard. He continued to swim for Harvard in dual meets.

In 2010, Hawkins was awarded an Australian Sports Medal by the Commonwealth of Australia for his swimming achievements.

His father, Gordon Frederick Hawkins, served in the Australian Army in the 2/1st Battalion in World War II, where he fought multiple campaigns in North Africa. In the Battle of Crete, he was taken POW and spent the remainder of the war in Germany in Stalag 13 C.

== Academic career ==
In 1956, Hawkins was awarded a Bachelor of Arts (cum laude in general studies) from Harvard College.

In 1958, he earned a Masters of Business Administration (with distinction) degree from the Harvard Graduate School of Business Administration.

In 1962, Hawkins was awarded a Doctorate in Business Administration from the Harvard Graduate School of Business Administration and joined the faculty as an assistant professor. Subsequently, in 1970, he was promoted to full professor with tenure.

In June 2015, Hawkins became the Lovett-Learned Professor of Business Administration, Emeritus, at the Harvard Business School. Hawkins was in research and teaching roles in the Accounting Department at Harvard Business School for over 55 years (1960-2015), specializing in Financial Reporting and Control. He died on 5 November 2020 in Boston, Massachusetts.

== See also ==
- List of Commonwealth Games medallists in swimming (men)
