= Jimmy McLane =

American swimmer (1930–2020)

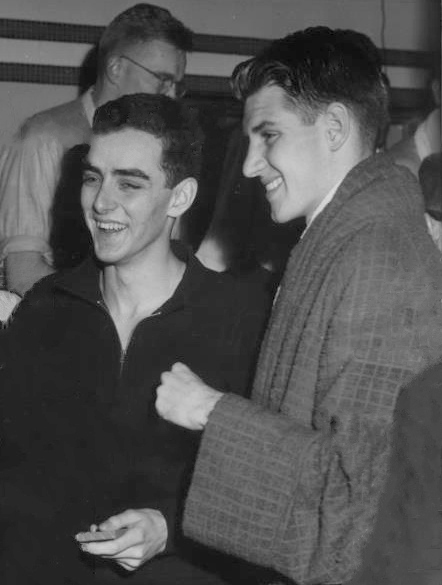
- McLane (left) in 1950

Personal information
- Full name: James Price McLane Jr.
- Nickname: "Jimmy"
- National team: United States
- Born: September 13, 1930 Pittsburgh, Pennsylvania, U.S.
- Died: December 13, 2020 (aged 90) Ipswich, Massachusetts, U.S.
- Spouses: Barbara Hamby McLane (m. 1950's); Carol McLane (m. 2004)

Sport
- Sport: Swimming
- Strokes: Freestyle
- Club: Firestone Swim Club, Akron; New Haven Swim Club
- College team: Yale University
- Coach: Harold Minto (Firestone); Robert J. H. Kiphuth (Yale)
Medal record
Representing the United States
Olympic Games
Gold medal – first place	1948 London	1500 m freestyle
Gold medal – first place	1948 London	4×200 m freestyle
Gold medal – first place	1952 Helsinki	4×200 m freestyle
Silver medal – second place	1948 London	400 m freestyle
Pan American Games
Gold medal – first place	1955 Mexico City	400 m freestyle
Gold medal – first place	1955 Mexico City	1500 m freestyle
Gold medal – first place	1955 Mexico City	4×200 m freestyle
Representing Yale
NCAA
Gold medal – first place	1953 Columbus	Team title
Gold medal – first place	1953 Columbus	220 yard freestyle
Gold medal – first place	1953 Columbus	1,500 meter freestyle

James Price McLane Jr. (September 13, 1930 – December 13, 2020) was an American competition swimmer who competed for Yale University, a three-time Olympic champion, and a world record-holder. In 1945-48, in his peak years as a swimming competitor, as an exceptional middle distance swimmer, he captured two Olympic gold medals, and thirteen championships on the national level, winning another gold medal in the 4x200 meter freestyle relay at the 1952 Olympics.

McLane was born September 13, 1930 in Pittsburgh, Pennsylvania. In his youth he swam for Akron, Ohio's Firestone Swim Club under Head Coach Harold Minto. At the age of 13, he won the four-mile swim at the national AAU outdoor long-distance championships while a swimmer for the Firestone Club. As a student at Phillips Academy in Andover, MA, which he attended on a swimming scholarship, he set national high school records in the 200-yard freestyle, 220-yard freestyle, and 440-yard freestyle.

== Yale University ==
He attended Yale University, under Hall of Fame Coach Robert J. H. Kiphuth, where in the years 1951, and 1953, he helped the Yale Bulldogs swimming and diving team win National Collegiate Athletic Association (NCAA) Championships. Kiphuth, an important life figure, in addition to serving as his Yale swim coach, acted as his guardian while McLane was attending both Yale and prep school at Andover. At Yale, McLane swam with outstanding fellow swimmers Wayne Moore and John Marshall. He graduated from Yale in 1953. Active in extracurricular activities, he was a member of the honorary Skull and Bones, the Elizabethan Club, focused on furthering an awareness of the Arts and Literature, and the Aurelian Society, focused on achieving a professional life in service to the community.

== 1948 London Olympics ==
At the 1948 U.S. Olympic trials for the 4x200-meter freestyle relay, several swimmers who had already qualified for the Olympics in other events slowed down in their heats or swam fast in the prelims and scratched themselves for the final to allow more swimmers to qualify for the U.S. Olympic Team. McLane was one of the two swimmers who swam and scratched themselves from the trials final after having the fastest time in the prelims. Ultimately, coach Robert Kiphuth held a time trial shortly after the actual trials with eleven of the swimmers. This time trial had McLane as first overall with a time of 2:11.0, Bill Smith and Wally Wolf in 2:11.2, and Wally Ris in 2:12.4. The next four-Eugene Rogers in 2:14.2, Edwin Gilbert in 2:15.4, Robert Gibe in 2:15.6, and William Dudley in 2:15.9, were used in the Olympic prelims.

Representing the United States at the 1948 Summer Olympics in London, England as a 17-year-old, McLane won a gold medal in the men's 1500-meter freestyle, with a time of 19:18.5, finishing almost 13 seconds ahead of Australian and fellow Yale swimmer John Marshall (19:31.3). He also earned a silver medal for his second-place finish in the men's 400-meter freestyle (4:43.4), finishing behind fellow American Bill Smith (4:41.0).

He won another gold medal at the 1948 Olympics, along with teammates Wally Ris, Wally Wolf, and Bill Smith, as a member of the U.S.'s 4 × 200-meter freestyle relay, which set a new world record of 8:46.0 in the event final.

== 1952 Helsinki Olympics ==
Four years later at the 1952 Summer Olympics in Helsinki, Finland, McLane won another gold medal by swimming the anchor leg for the U.S. team in the 4 × 200-meter freestyle relay, together with relay teammates Wayne Moore, Bill Woolsey, and Ford Konno. The Americans set a new Olympic record of 8:31.1 in the final. In individual competition, he finished fourth in the men's 1,500-meter freestyle (18:51.5), and seventh in the men's 400-meter freestyle (4:40.3).

During the Korean War era, McLane served with a branch of Army Intelligence in greater New York, and during his years of service, swam and trained with the U.S. Army for two years.

=== Post-swimming life ===
He retired from swimming after winning three gold medals at the 1955 Pan American Games.

McLane was married to Barbara Hamby in the early 1950's and later to his wife Carol around 2004. In McLane's professional career after retiring from swimming, he worked for General Mills and Life Magazine. Suffering from Multiple Sclerosis in mid-life, he retired from his careers, but continued to lead a physically active and full life.

=== Honors ===
In 1970, he was inducted into the International Swimming Hall of Fame.

McLane died at his home in Ipswich, Massachusetts, on December 13, 2020, at the age of 90. He had lived in Ipswich for the past 13 years. He was survived by his wife Carol whom he married around 2004, three sons, a daughter, grandchildren and great-grandchildren. Services were held gravesite at Ipswich's South Side Cemetery.

== See also ==
- List of members of the International Swimming Hall of Fame
- List of multiple Olympic gold medalists at a single Games
- List of Olympic medalists in swimming (men)
- List of Yale University people
- World record progression 4 × 200 metres freestyle relay
