= William Yorzyk =

American swimmer (1933–2020)

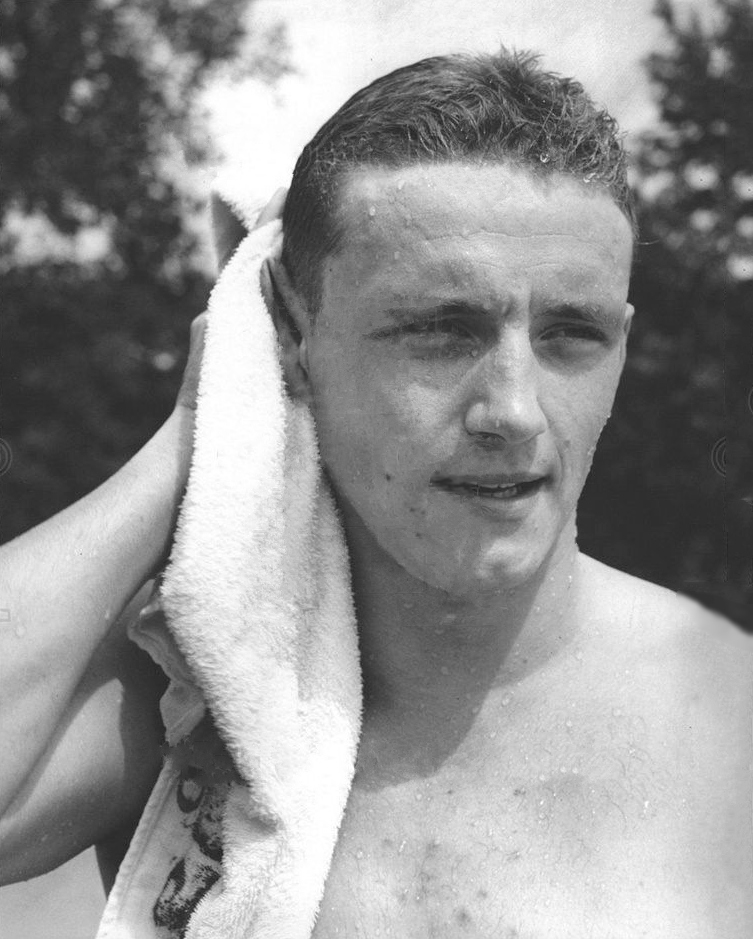
- Yorzyk in 1956

Personal information
- Full name: William Albert Yorzyk Jr.
- Nickname: "Bill"
- National team: United States
- Born: May 29, 1933 Northampton, Massachusetts, U.S.
- Died: September 2, 2020 (aged 87)
- Height: 5 ft 10 in (1.78 m)
- Weight: 163 lb (74 kg)

Sport
- Sport: Swimming
- Strokes: Butterfly, breaststroke, freestyle
- College team: Springfield College
- Coach: Charles Silvia
Medal record
Representing the United States
Olympic Games
Gold medal – first place	1956 Melbourne	200 m butterfly
Pan American Games
Gold medal – first place	1955 Mexico City	4×200 m freestyle
Bronze medal – third place	1955 Mexico City	200 m butterfly

William Albert "Bill" Yorzyk Jr. (May 29, 1933 – September 2, 2020) was an American competitive swimmer, Olympic champion, and world record holder.

After learning to swim at Springfield College, Yorzyk achieved All-American status in various freestyle and breaststroke events. As the butterfly stroke was beginning to be contested in international competition, Yorzyk and his coach worked on the stroke, and Yorzyk went on to win the 200 m butterfly event at the national Amateur Athletic Union (AAU) Outdoor Swimming Championships for four consecutive years from 1955 to 1958. He also won several other events over different years at both the AAU Indoor Championships and Outdoor Championships.

At the 1955 Pan American Games, Yorzyk won a bronze medal in the 200 m butterfly and a gold medal as part of the US team in the 4 × 200 m freestyle relay. He then won gold at the inaugural 200-meter butterfly event at the 1956 Melbourne Olympics. In total during his career, Yorzyk set 11 world records and 23 American records.

After retiring from swimming and finishing his studies at the University of Toronto medical school, Yorzyk pursued a career in medicine. He served as a physician and captain in the United States Air Force Medical Corps, as a physician to the US embassy in Tokyo and to the US swimming team in Japan in 1963, and as an associate physician to the US delegation at the Olympic Games in 1964.

== Early life and training ==
William Albert Yorzyk Jr. was born on May 29, 1933, in Northampton, Massachusetts; he later came to be known as "Bill". In 1950, at 16 years old, Yorzyk entered Springfield College, Massachusetts, which at the time assessed the swimming skills of all freshmen. Yorzyk was assessed as a "water risk" due to his lack of swimming ability, so he started practicing to meet the college's swimming standards. While practicing swimming at Springfield's pool, he was noticed by Charles Silvia, the coach there, who saw potential in Yorzyk and began training him at the 20-yard pool on campus. Yorzyk later recalled "I lived at the pool, swam between classes, and became totally waterlogged".

== Competitive swimming at Springfield ==
Yorzyk won the college's swim competition for freshmen, before reaching NCAA All-American status in the 1500 and 440-yard freestyle events the following year. In his senior year, he again achieved All-American status in the 1500 and 440-yard freestyle, as well as an All-America in the 200-yard breaststroke. (Note: Springfield College instead lists Yorzyk as having achieved All-American status in the 440-yard freestyle in 1953, and then in the 220, 440, and 1500-yard freestyle, and in the 200-yard backstroke the following year.) He also became the eastern intercollegiate champion and co-captain of the swim team. Yorzyk used the developing butterfly-breaststroke technique, which involved recovering the arms over the water rather than under the water as was traditional.

== Development of butterfly ==
Later in 1954, Yorzyk and Silvia attended the National Amateur Athletic Union (AAU) Indoor Swimming Championships, where they witnessed the butterfly stroke for the first time, swum by Buddy Baarcke. Yorzyk recalled: "As soon as I saw [Baarcke's] swim I knew I could swim that stroke [...] We came home from Yale and started work on the fly. It came easily for me, and we were off and away." Under Silvia's coaching, Yorzyk was the first to breathe every other stroke exclusively in butterfly, the first to use two kicks per arm cycle, and used several other concepts from physics to optimise the stroke.

== National and international competition ==
After graduating, Yorzyk became a graduate assistant in physical education and continued competing. In 1955, he won the 200-meter butterfly at the AAU Outdoor Swimming Championships, before winning a bronze medal in the 200 m butterfly and a gold medal as part of the US team in the 4 × 200 m freestyle relay at the 1955 Pan American Games. In 1956, he won the most points of any male swimmer at the AAU Outdoor Swimming Championships, breaking the world records to win both the 200 m butterfly and 400 m individual medley events. He also swam as part of a world-record-breaking 4 × 100 m medley relay and 4 × 200 m freestyle relay that year.

=== Olympic Gold ===
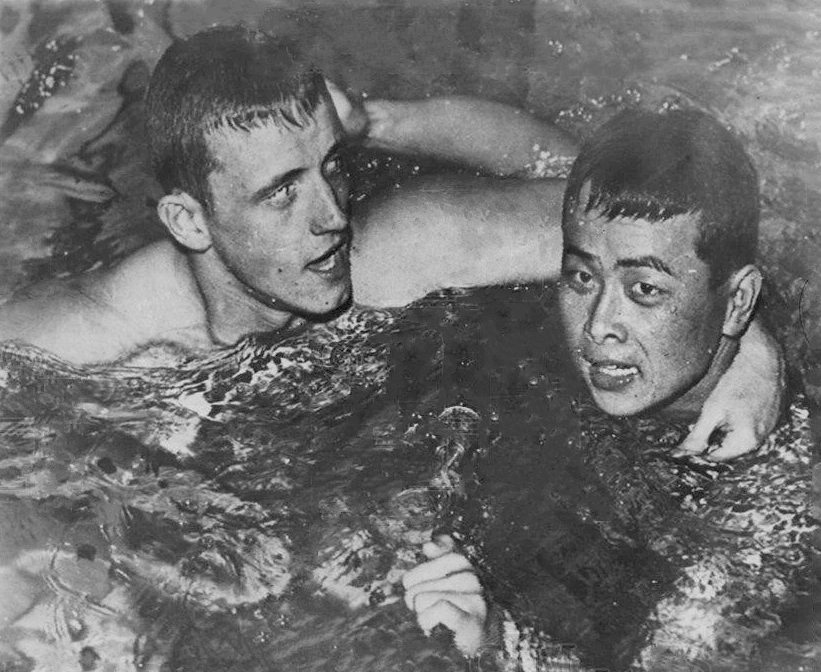
William Yorzyk and Japan's Takashi Ishimoto at the 1956 Summer Olympics

Yorzyk represented the United States at the 1956 Summer Olympics in Melbourne, Australia, where he continued to be coached by Silvia, who was selected as an assistant coach to the US team. Yorzyk became the first swimmer to win gold in the new 200 m butterfly event, finishing with a time of 2:19.3 in the final, (Note: Several modern biographies write that Yorzyk achieved world records in his heat and/or final swims. The official Olympic report writes that Yorzyk held the world record of 2:16.7 prior to the Olympics, and as such no world records were set during this event at the Games.) which was over four seconds faster than the second place finisher, Takashi Ishimoto of Japan. His time of 2:18.6 in the heats set the Olympic record. He was the only male swimmer from the US to win gold at the Games and later donated his medal to Springfield College for it to be displayed at the university's swimming pool.

== Later achievements in swimming and medicine ==
Yorzyk enrolled in the University of Toronto medical school in 1957. He continued to swim competitively while qualifying as an anesthesiologist, winning the national AAU indoor championship in the 220-yard butterfly in 1958, and winning the 200 m butterfly at the AAU Outdoor Championships in 1957 and 1958, meaning he held the title for four consecutive years from 1955 to 1958. Yorzyk was awarded the university's Bickle Prize as its outstanding student athlete in 1958 and 1959, during which he was head coach of the swimming program at the university. He retired from competitive swimming in 1960 to pursue a career in medicine. In total during his career, Yorzyk set 11 world records and 23 American records.

After leaving Toronto, Yorzyk served as a physician and captain in the United States Air Force Medical Corps. He was a physician to the US embassy in Tokyo, to the US swimming team in Japan in 1963, and an associate physician to the US delegation at the Olympic Games in 1964. At the 1964 Games, he also announced Olympic results over the US Armed Forces radio. In the 1970s, Yorzyk made contributions to the design of diving blocks in swimming, simplified epidural techniques in anesthesiology to reduce side effects, and helped expand Baystate Medical Center.

Yorzyk resumed swimming in later life, competing in masters competitions, where he set 14 individual masters national records and five relay national records between 45 and 59 years old, all of which have since been broken. He also won multiple US Masters Swimming national championships. Yorzyk last competed in 1989, as he had to undergo reconstructive shoulder surgery. He was inducted into the International Swimming Hall of Fame as an "Honor Swimmer" in 1971.

== Personal life and death ==
William Yorzyk was married to Carrol-Jean Yorzyk, who he met while in Toronto, and they had two children named Jennifer and Jeffrey. William Yorzyk died on September 2, 2020, aged 87, at his home in East Brookfield. An annual fundraising open water swim called the "Wild Bill Swim" was set up by his daughter and occurs annually in his honor.

== See also ==
- List of members of the International Swimming Hall of Fame
- List of Olympic medalists in swimming (men)
- List of Springfield University alumni

== Bibliography ==
- Barney, David; Barney, Robert (December 2008). "A Long Night's Journey into Day: The Odyssey of Butterfly". Journal of Olympic History. 16 (3): 12 – via Olympic World Library.
