= Robert J. H. Kiphuth =

American swimming coach

Biographical details
- Born: November 17, 1890; Tonawanda, New York, U.S.
- Died: January 7, 1967 (aged 76); New Haven, Connecticut, U.S.

Coaching career (HC unless noted)
- 1918–1959: Yale
- 1928: U.S. Olympic Women's Coach
- 1932-36: U.S. Olympic Men's Coach

Administrative career (AD unless noted)
- 1947–1949: Yale

Head coaching record
- Overall: 520–12 .98 Winning %

Accomplishments and honors

Championships
- 4 NCAA (1942, 1944, 1951, 1953); 38 Eastern Intercollegiate Titles

Awards
- '65 International Swimming Hall of Fame '63 Presidential Medal of Freedom

Robert John Herman Kiphuth (November 17, 1890 – January 7, 1967) was an American swimming coach and college athletics administrator. He served as the head men's swimming coach at Yale University for 41 years, from 1918 to 1959. During his tenure with the Yale Bulldogs swimming and diving team, he amassed a record of 520 wins to only 12 losses, along with four NCAA titles (1942, 1944, 1951, 1953), earning a reputation as one of America's most winning swim coaches in the history of the sport.

== Early life, and coaching achievements ==
Kiphuth was born to John and Mary Benin Kiphuth in Tonawanda, New York on November 17, 1890. Tonawanda, in the greater Buffalo area, was not known for producing great swimmers, but several great swim coaches. He began his career as a fitness instructor at the Tonawanda YMCA from 1911-1914, and learned to swim at a young age in Ellicott Creek, near where he was born at 258 Young Street in Tonawanda. He left the Tonawanda gym to begin his duties as an Assistant Instructor at Yale in 1914. Though he had worked almost exclusively as an exercise, gymnastics, and fitness instructor, he began as a Yale swim coach at the old Carnegie Pool in New Haven when Matt Mann left as Yale swim coach in 1917. His success as a swim coach was immediate and ongoing, and his innovative approach was quickly adopted by many in the swimming community. Though he did not receive a formal college education, and studied only through High School, he took courses at Yale, read widely, and had 4,000 books in his suite at Yale.

Breaking from the accepted wisdom of his era, he encouraged his swimmers to run cross-country track to gain endurance, and to engage in dry land exercises to gain strength. Championing an enlightened approach to training his swimmers, he led his Yale teams to four NCAA Championships in 1942, 1944, 1951, and 1953. His books and articles greatly benefitted the swimming community and his accomplishments convinced his competitors of the soundness of his approach. In addition to his NCAA championships, he won 38 Eastern Intercollegiate titles, produced 14 AAU National Team Championships, and was a U.S. Olympic swim coach for five Olympics including three as Head Coach in 1932, 1936, and 1948. Near the end of his coaching career, his Yale teams won 142 consecutive dual meets. His 1948 U.S. Olympic swim team won first place in every event, an accomplishment that has never been equaled.

=== Marriage ===
At 26, Kiphuth married Louise Delaney, 24, of Buffalo on June 17, 1917, in Chicago, Illinois. Like her husband Robert, Louise was a fitness enthusiast. The couple had a son, Delaney in 1918.

=== Olympic coach ===
As noted, Kiphuth also served as the head coach for multiple U.S. Olympic swimming teams, serving as a U.S. Olympic Head Coach in 1932, 1936 and 1948 (both men and women, depending on the year). From 1947 to 1949, he doubled as Yale's athletic director. He was largely responsible for the modern training approach to the sport of swimming, with his focus on dryland workouts, and interval training.

=== Swimming community roles ===
From 1951 to 1961, Kiphuth was the first publisher and a co-founder of Swimming World Magazine, which heralded a more informed approach to assessing swimming competition on the team and individual level. Still in print, and widely read, the magazine was another of his gifts to the swimming community and an important part of his legacy.

He was a founder of the Council for National Cooperation in Aquatics, served as a Vice President of the International Swimming Hall of Fame. He directed the Boys Clubs of America, and served with the National Art Museum of Sports, and the President’s Fitness Council. He was also the National Swim Chairman of the American Athletic Union (AAU).

=== Honors ===
Kiphuth was awarded the Presidential Medal of Freedom by President Lyndon Johnson on December 6, 1963. He had been chosen to receive the award by President John F. Kennedy. President Kennedy also received the Medal of Freedom, posthumously, at the same ceremony.

Since 1968, the high-point award at the USA's Swimming National Championships has been named in his honor (the "Kiphuth Award").

In 1965 he was inducted as an Honor member into the International Swimming Hall of Fame. He is also in the Buffalo, NY. area Sports Hall of Fame.

Kiphurth died on January 7, 1967, in New Haven, Connecticut, after suffering a heart attack. As noted, he was married to Louise Delaney Kiphuth, who pre-deceased him in 1941. His son, Delaney, who attended Yale, served as a Football and swim coach at the Hotchkiss School, and then worked as Athletics Director at Yale for twenty-two years, from 1954-1976. Robert H. Kiphuth was buried in New Haven's Evergreen Cemetery, as was his wife Louise.

== Books ==
- Barnes, A.S., Kiphuth, J. H. Swimming, (1952)
- Burke, Harry M., Kiphuth, J. H. Basic Swimming, Greenwood Press Publishers, (1950) Westport, Connecticut ISBN 978-0-8371-5168-7
- Kiphuth, J. H., How to be Fit, (1942) First Edition, later (1956) Revisited Edition, Yale University Press, New Haven, Connecticut, Revisited Edition ISBN 978-0-300-10543-8

== See also ==
- List of members of the International Swimming Hall of Fame
- Wayne Moore (swimmer)
