= Ford Konno =

Japanese–American swimmer (born 1933)

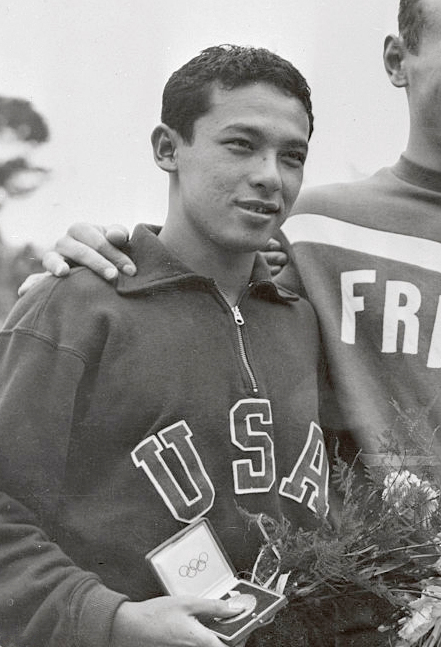
- Konno at the 1952 Olympics

Personal information
- Full name: Ford Hiroshi Konno
- National team: United States
- Born: January 1, 1933 (age 93) Honolulu, Territory of Hawaii, U.S.
- Occupations: Swim Coach; Teacher; Sales Agent
- Height: 5 ft 6 in (1.68 m)
- Weight: 150 lb (68 kg)
- Spouse: Evelyn Kawamoto

Sport
- Sport: Swimming
- Strokes: Freestyle
- Club: U.S. Army
- College team: Ohio State University
- Coach: Yoshito Sagawa (Primary Coach); Mike Peppe (Ohio State); Bob Muir ('56 Olympics)
Medal record
Representing the United States
Olympic Games
Gold medal – first place	1952 Helsinki	1500 m freestyle
Gold medal – first place	1952 Helsinki	4×200 m freestyle
Silver medal – second place	1952 Helsinki	400 m freestyle
Silver medal – second place	1956 Melbourne	4×200 m freestyle
Representing Ohio State
NCAA
Gold medal – first place	1952 Princeton	Team event
Gold medal – first place	1952 Princeton	440 yard freestyle
Gold medal – first place	1952 Princeton	1,500 yard freestyle
Gold medal – first place	1954 Syracuse	Team title
Gold medal – first place	1954 Syracuse	440 yard freestyle
Gold medal – first place	1954 Syracuse	1,500 yard freestyle
Gold medal – first place	1955 Oxford	Team title
Gold medal – first place	1955 Oxford	440 yard freestyle
Gold medal – first place	1955 Oxford	1,500 yard freestyle

Ford Hiroshi Konno (Japanese: 紺野 裕, born January 1, 1933) is a Japanese–American former competition swimmer, two-time Olympic champion, and former world record-holder in three events. After marrying his High School sweetheart Evelyn Kawamoto, an Olympic bronze medalist, he had a career in Hawaii as a Swim Coach, teacher, and sales agent.

Konno was born in Honolulu, Hawaii in 1933 to Mr. and Mrs. Chi Konno. He attended McKinley High School in Honolulu, graduating in 1951, and swam for the McKinley Tigers high school swim team.

== Ohio State University ==
Konno received an athletic scholarship to attend Ohio State University, where from 1952-1956, he swam for the Ohio State Buckeyes swimming and diving team under Hall of Fame Coach Mike Peppe in National Collegiate Athletic Association (NCAA) competition. Konno set world records of 2:03.9 in the 200-meter and 4:26.7 in the 400-meter freestyle during 1954 college meets.

During his time as an Ohio State swimmer, Konno captured just over 30 swimming titles, and placed first in Big Ten Conference championship events nine times. He placed first in six NCAA Championship events.

== Olympics ==
Konno won four medals at the 1952 and 1956 Summer Olympics. At the 1952 Summer Olympics in Helsinki, Finland, where he was managed by Head Olympic Coach Matthew Mann, Konno won gold medals in the men's 1,500-meter freestyle and the 4×200-meter freestyle relay. His time of 18:30:3 in the 1,500 freestyle was a new Olympic record. He also won a silver medal in the 400-meter freestyle 4:31.3. In the 400-meter final, Konno finished on the heels of French swimmer Jean Boiteux, who took the gold with a time of 4:30.7. Konno, who was known to surge at the finish, nearly caught Boiteux, but faded in the last 15 meters.

Four years later at the December, 1956 Summer Olympics in Melbourne, Australia, he won a silver medal in the men's 4×200-meter freestyle relay that finished with a combined time of 8:31.5, finishing around eight seconds behind the team from Australia who took the gold with a time of 8:23.6. At the 1956 Olympics, Konno was coached by Bob Muir, a Hall of Fame inductee, who would have a 30 year career as a swim coach for Williams College.

=== Marriage and family ===
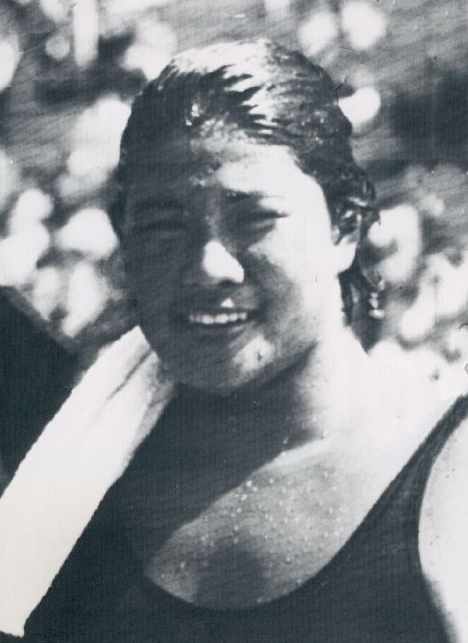
Evelyn Kawamoto, '52

On June 9, 1956, prior to the 1956 Olympic trials, Konno married Evelyn Kawamoto, a U.S. Olympic bronze medalist and exceptional Hawaiian swimming competitor who he had known since attending McKinley High School in Hawaii. The couple, who were very close in age and both swam together in High School, were married at St. Steven's Episcopal Church near the Ohio State Campus in a double wedding with fellow Ohio State swimming star Gerald S. McNamee, a Canadian swimming champion. Evelyn was working as a Secretary for Pan Am's World Airlines in New York. Ohio State Swim Coach Mike Peppe gave Evelyn Kawamoto away, and Konno's mother Mrs. Chie Konno was in attendance. After a honeymoon in Nasau, Konno and Kawamoto planned to live for a period in New York, where he would train for the 1956 Melbourne Olympics. The couple would later have two daughters.

=== Careers ===
After graduating from Ohio State University, Konno worked as a high school teacher and swimming coach on the island of Kauai, Hawaii, and later became division manager for an equity life insurance company. Semi-retired by 1992, Konno continued to live in Hawaii and still did occasional sales work for Investor's Equity Life Insurance, while also working for Hawaiian Isle Distributors and Brown and Williamson Tobacco Company.

=== Honors ===
In a rare distinction in 1972, Konno was inducted into the International Swimming Hall of Fame. He was later a 1977 inductee to the Ohio State University Hall of Fame.

== See also ==
- List of members of the International Swimming Hall of Fame
- List of Ohio State University people
- List of Olympic medalists in swimming (men)
- World record progression 200 metres freestyle
- World record progression 400 metres freestyle
- World record progression 800 metres freestyle

Records
Preceded by John Marshall	Men's 200-meter freestyle world record-holder (long course); February 27, 1954 – March 4, 1955	Succeeded by John Wardrop
Preceded by John Marshall	Men's 400-meter freestyle world record-holder (long course); April 3, 1954 – January 12, 1957	Succeeded by Murray Rose
