= Dick Cleveland =

American swimmer (1929–2002)

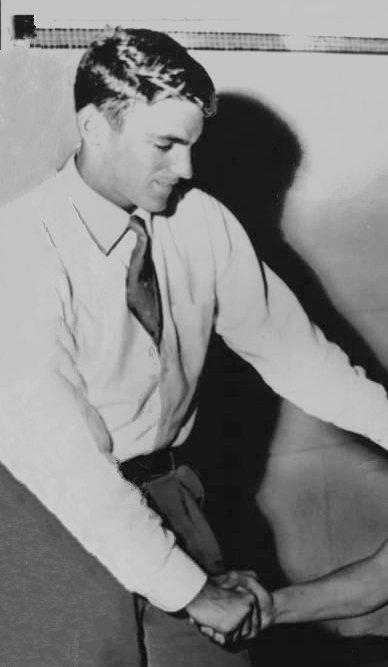
- Cleveland in 1954

Personal information
- Full name: Richard Fitch Cleveland
- Nicknames: "Dick," "Spoofy"
- National team: United States
- Born: September 21, 1929 Honolulu, Hawaii
- Died: July 27, 2002 (aged 72) Kailua-Kona, Hawaii, U.S.
- Height: 6 ft (183 cm)
- Weight: 140–195 lb (64–88 kg)
- Spouse: Pauline

Sport
- Sport: Swimming
- Strokes: Freestyle
- Club: Hawaii Swim Club
- College team: Ohio State University
- Coach: Soichi Sakamoto (Hawaii Swim Club); Mike Peppe (Ohio State)
Medal record
Representing United States
Pan American Games
Gold medal – first place	1951 Buenos Aires	100 m freestyle
Gold medal – first place	1951 Buenos Aires	4×200 m freestyle
Gold medal – first place	1951 Buenos Aires	3×100 m medley
Representing Ohio State
NCAA
Gold medal – first place	1953 Columbus	300 yard medley relay
Gold medal – first place	1954 Syracuse	Team title
Gold medal – first place	1954 Syracuse	50 yard freestyle
Gold medal – first place	1954 Syracuse	100 yard freestyle

Richard Fitch Cleveland (September 21, 1929 – July 27, 2002) was a Hawaiian-born American competition Hall of Fame swimmer, three-time Pan American Games champion, and former world record-holder in the 100 meters and 100 yard events. He attended Ohio State University, and was one of the early competitive swimmers to benefit from the use of weight training in the off season. He later worked as a real estate broker

== High School swimming ==
He swam for Honolulu's Punahou School, a highly competitive team coached by Bobby Rath. He placed second overall in May 1947 in Punahou's Thurston Meet in the Senior Academy division winning the 50-yard backstroke in 30.8 seconds and the 75-yard Individual Medley in 46 seconds. He received his most structured and challenging training from Hall of Fame Coach Soichi Sakamoto where he competed with the Hawaii Swim Club in Honolulu. In his career, Sakamoto coached five Olympians and served as an Assistant Coach at the 1952 and 1956 Olympics.

== Ohio State ==
After graduating Punahou in 1947, where he also was on the school's Golf Team, Cleveland served in the Army while weight training for a year with athlete Moki Kealoha at the Schofield Barracks army base in Honolulu. He also swam competitively for the Army. He attended University of Hawaiʻi at Mānoa for a year where he continued to be coached by Soichi Sakamoto. He then transferred to Ohio State University, where he swam for the Ohio State Buckeyes swimming and diving team in National Collegiate Athletic Association (NCAA). While managed by Hall of Fame Coach Mike Peppe at Ohio State, Cleveland's achievements grew. He captured four NCAA national titles including the 50-yard freestyle in 1952, three Big Ten Conference titles, and was a six-time AAU First Team All-American.

A short distance freestyle specialist, Cleveland held four world records at the same time during the 1950s. These included the 100-yard freestyle, the 75-yard freestyle, the 400-meter relay, and the 100-meter freestyle. In his career, he held ten American records. An army friend suggested he train with weights, and it improved his swimming career as a sprinter. He lifted weights under the training regiment of Moki Kealoha, an accomplished athlete.

== International highlights ==
At the 1951 Pan American Games in Buenos Aires, Argentina, he won gold medals in the men's 3×100-meter medley relay, 4×200-meter freestyle relay, and 100-meter freestyle. At the 1952 Summer Olympics in Helsinki, Finland, he competed in the 100-meter freestyle but failed to reach the final. He retired from competitions around 1960.

He met his wife Pauline in High School while she attended Sacred Hearts Academy, in Honolulu and married around 1955 during his competitive swimming career.

== Post-swimming career ==
In 1963 he served on the Executive Committee of the Hawaii Athletic Sponsors, tasked with managing public relations for the organization. He later worked as a real estate broker in Maui, with his business Inter-Island Real Estate, Inc., a career from which he retired. As late as 1990, Cleveland was still involved in selling real estate and acting as a broker in Hawaii, largely on Maui. In 1995, he and his wife Pauline moved to the larger island of Hawaii, likely from Maui where he grew up in Honolulu. In his retirement, he was an avid golfer, and became a skilled player.

== Honors ==
He was inducted into the Swimming Hall of Fame in 1980, and the Ohio State and Hawaii Sports Halls of Fame.

He died on July 27, 2002 in Kailua-Kona, Hawaii. He was survived by wife Pauline, and his sister Ann Richards of Maine.

== See also ==
- List of members of the International Swimming Hall of Fame
- List of Ohio State University people
- World record progression 100 metres freestyle
