= Iowa Hawkeyes swimming and diving =

Swimming and diving team of the University of Iowa

- Founded: 1917 (Men); 1974 (Women)
- Head coach: Marc Long
- Conference: Big Ten Conference
- Location: Iowa City, Iowa, US
- Home pool: Campus Recreation and Wellness Center
- Colors: Black and gold

Men's Conference Champions
- 3 (1936, 1981, 1982)

The Iowa Hawkeyes swimming and diving team represents the University of Iowa in NCAA men's and women's swimming and diving. The teams compete at Campus Recreation and Wellness Center in Iowa City. Marc Long is the head coach of both the men's and women's swimming teams. Todd Waikel is the head diving coach.

== Facilities ==
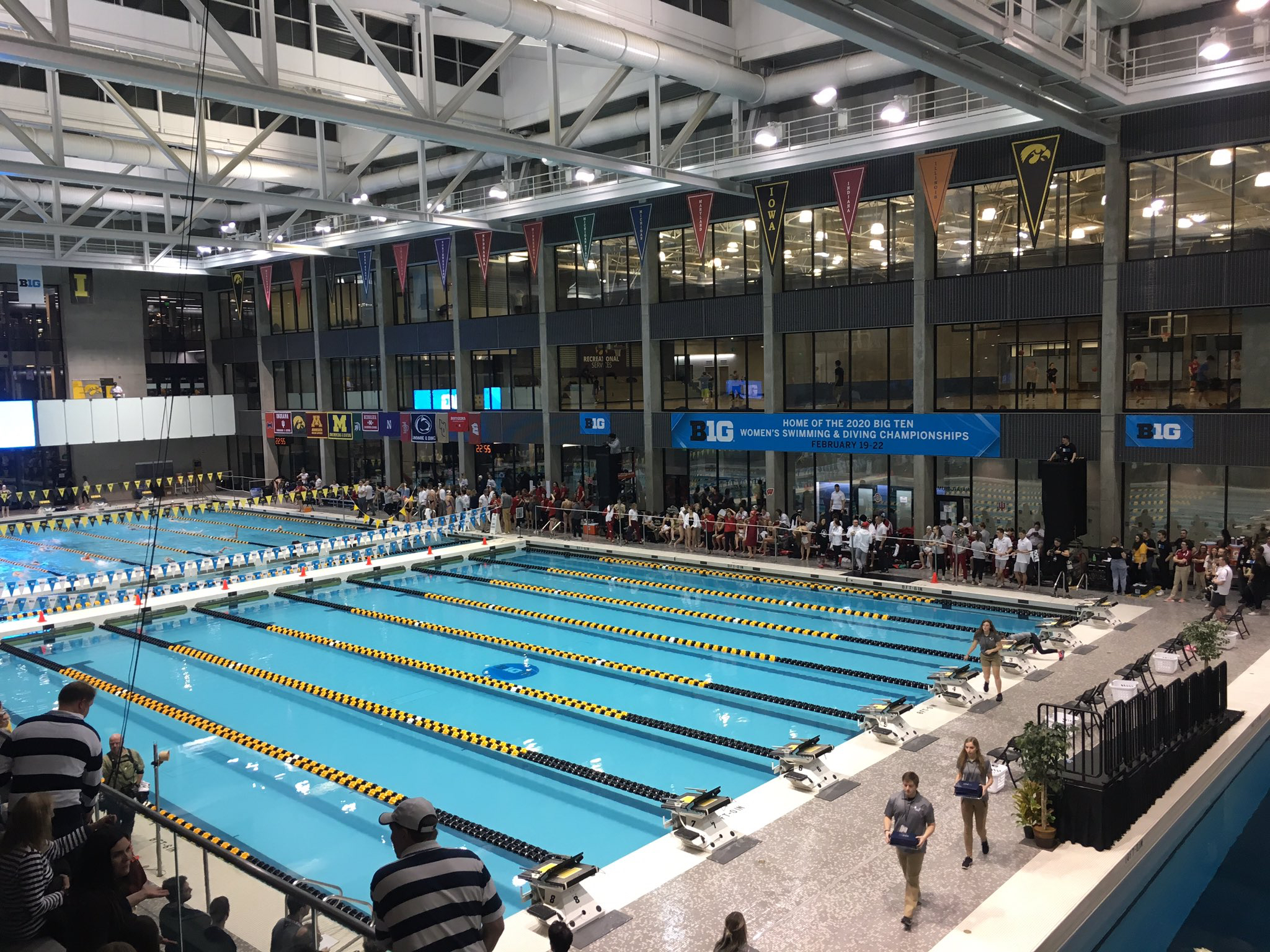
Campus Recreation and Wellness Center during the 2020 Women's B1G Championships.

The Iowa Swimming and Diving program competes in Campus Recreation and Wellness Center located on the east side of the Iowa campus.

== Year-By-Year ==
Men's Swimming & Diving
Year	Coach	W-L-T	Big Ten	NCAA
1917	David Armbruster	0-1-0		
1918	David Armbruster			
1919	David Armbruster	0-0-0	5th	
1920	David Armbruster	0-3-0	T-6th	
1921	David Armbruster	0-4-0	7th	
1922	David Armbruster	0-2-0	6th	
1923	David Armbruster	1-2-0	8th	
1924	David Armbruster	3-2-0	T-4th	
1925	David Armbruster	2-2-0	T-5th	
1926	David Armbruster	2-3-0	7th	
1927	David Armbruster	0-6-0	T-7th	
1928	David Armbruster	2-3-0	T-4th	
1929	David Armbruster	4-2-0	T-6th	
1930	David Armbruster	3-0-0	T-5th	
1931	David Armbruster	3-2-0	T-2nd	
1932	David Armbruster	1-1-0	3rd	
1933	David Armbruster	3-3-0	5th	
1934	David Armbruster	4-1-0	2nd	
1935	David Armbruster	4-1-0	3rd	
1936	David Armbruster	3-1-0	1st	
1937	David Armbruster	5-1-1	3rd	5th
1938	David Armbruster	3-1-0	3rd	6th
1939	David Armbruster	3-2-0	T-4th	T-9th
1940	David Armbruster	5-1-0	4th	
1941	David Armbruster	5-1-0	2nd	7th
1942	David Armbruster	3-2-0	5th	T-9th
1943	David Armbruster	2-2-0	4th	4th
1944	David Armbruster	0-2-1	6th	
1945	David Armbruster	2-2-1	8th	T-12th
1946	David Armbruster	5-1-0	3rd	T-9th
1947	David Armbruster	5-2-0	3rd	7th
1948	David Armbruster	3-2-0	3rd	T-6th
1949	David Armbruster	4-1-0	2nd	2nd
1950	David Armbruster	3-3-0	3rd	3rd
1951	David Armbruster	4-3-0	5th	T-9th
1952	David Armbruster	5-1-0	4th	8th
1953	David Armbruster	3-3-0	4th	T-23rd
1954	David Armbruster	2-4-0	8th	T-22nd
1955	David Armbruster	4-3-0	3rd	17th
1956	David Armbruster	8-0-0	T-3rd	4th
1957	David Armbruster	4-3-0	8th	8th
1958	David Armbruster	4-3-0	4th	5th
1959	Robert Allen	4-4-0	5th	7th
1960	Robert Allen	3-3-0	5th	13th
1961	Robert Allen	4-3-0	6th	12th
1962	Robert Allen	4-4-0	7th	21st
1963	Robert Allen	0-8-0	9th	
1964	Robert Allen	3-5-0	8th	
1965	Robert Allen	5-3-0	7th	
1966	Robert Allen	6-3-0	8th	
1967	Robert Allen	4-4-0	10th	
1968	Robert Allen	4-4-1	10th	
1969	Robert Allen	2-6-0	10th	
1970	Robert Allen	5-8-0	9th	
1971	Robert Allen	2-8-0	9th	
1972	Robert Allen	5-7-0	10th	
1973	Robert Allen	4-6-0	10th	
1974	Robert Allen	3-7-0	10th	
1975	Robert Allen	0-8-0	10th	
1976	Glenn Patton	5-6-0	9th	
1977	Glenn Patton	8-6-0	7th	
1978	Glenn Patton	9-1-0	5th	24th
1979	Glenn Patton	7-2-0	4th	
1980	Glenn Patton	8-0-0	3rd	22nd
1981	Glenn Patton	8-3-0	1st	10th
1982	Glenn Patton	5-5-0	1st	17th
1983	Glenn Patton	3-7-0	2nd	22nd
1984	Glenn Patton	12-2-0	2nd	23rd
1985	Glenn Patton	5-5-0	3rd	18th
1986	Glenn Patton	12-2-0	3rd	14th
1987	Glenn Patton	13-1-0	2nd	18th
1988	Glenn Patton	7-4-0	2nd	13th
1989	Glenn Patton	6-3-0	2nd	8th
1990	Glenn Patton	7-1-0	3rd	14th
1991	Glenn Patton	7-0-0	4th	12th
1992	Glenn Patton	6-2-0	5th	13th
1993	Glenn Patton	8-1-0	3rd	17th
1994	Glenn Patton	6-4-0	4th	17th
1995	Glenn Patton	8-0-0	3rd	13th
1996	Glenn Patton	4-1-0	5th	33rd
1997	Glenn Patton	7-4-0	8th	41st
1998	Glenn Patton	7-3-0	9th	33rd
1999	John Davey	3-8-0	9th	39th
2000	John Davey	2-6-0	8th	28th
2001	John Davey	0-5-0	9th	
2002	John Davey	2-5-0	9th	
2003	John Davey	3-5-0	9th	39th
2004	John Davey	8-4-0	9th	T-28th
2005	John Davey	3-10-0	10th	
2006	Marc Long	3-6-0	9th	
2007	Marc Long	5-6-0	9th	
2008	Marc Long	3-4-0	9th	
2009	Marc Long	7-1-0	9th	
2010	Marc Long	10-1-0	6th	
2011	Marc Long	7-1-0	7th	35th
2012	Marc Long	7-2-0	5th	26th
2013	Marc Long	7-3-0	7th	32nd
2014	Marc Long	2-9-0	8th	
2015	Marc Long	7-2-0	8th	35th
2016	Marc Long	6-3-0	7th	40th
2017	Marc Long	6-3-0	8th	
2018	Marc Long	5-1-0	7th	40th
2019	Marc Long	6-2-0	8th	
2020	Marc Long			

Women's Swimming & Diving
Year	Coach	W-L-T	Big Ten	NCAA
1974-75	Deborah Woodside	1-2-0	9th	
1975-76	Deborah Woodside	2-1-0	10th	
1976-77	Deborah Woodside	1-1-0	8th	
1977-78	Deborah Woodside	5-0-0	5th	
1978-79	Deborah Woodside	0-3-0	10th	
1979-80	Deborah Woodside	1-10-0	8th	
1980-81	Deborah Woodside	3-12-0	9th	
1981-82	Dr. Peter Kennedy	3-5-0	8th	
1982-83	Dr. Peter Kennedy	6-2-0	4th	T-31st
1983-84	Dr. Peter Kennedy	11-0-0	3rd	26th
1984-85	Dr. Peter Kennedy	13-2-0	3rd	26th
1985-86	Dr. Peter Kennedy	8-2-0	T-2nd	39th
1986-87	Dr. Peter Kennedy	5-0-1	10th	
1987-88	Dr. Peter Kennedy	6-8-0	7th	
1988-89	Dr. Peter Kennedy	4-7-0	7th	
1989-90	Dr. Peter Kennedy	5-2-0	7th	
1990-91	Dr. Peter Kennedy	8-1-1	6th	42nd
1991-92	Dr. Peter Kennedy	8-2-0	7th	
1992-93	Dr. Peter Kennedy	4-5-0	7th	
1993-94	Dr. Peter Kennedy	5-5-0	9th	
1994-95	Dr. Peter Kennedy	1-7-0	11th	
1995-96	Trish Meyer	2-6-0	11th	
1996-97	Mary Bolich	2-5-0	10th	
1997-98	Mary Bolich	6-4-0	7th	
1998-99	Mary Bolich	8-4-0	7th	
1999-00	Mary Bolich	5-4-0	8th	
2000-01	Garland O'Keeffe	5-7-0	8th	40th
2001-02	Garland O'Keeffe	5-5-0	7th	35th
2002-03	Garland O'Keeffe	8-4-0	8th	20th
2003-04	Garland O'Keeffe	3-7-0	9th	
2004-05	Marc Long	5-4-0	8th	23rd
2005-06	Marc Long	8-6-0	10th	27th
2006-07	Marc Long	6-6-0	10th	
2007-08	Marc Long	5-7-0	9th	
2008-09	Marc Long	7-4-0	9th	
2009-10	Marc Long	8-4-0	9th	
2010-11	Marc Long	5-7-0	9th	T-30th
2011-12	Marc Long	10-6-0	9th	37th
2012-13	Marc Long	8-2-0	10th	
2013-14	Marc Long	9-5-0	8th	
2014-15	Marc Long	7-4-0	8th	38th
2015-16	Marc Long	8-3-0	11th	38th
2016-17	Marc Long	7-2-0	11th	26th
2017-18	Marc Long	6-3-0	11th	
2018-19	Marc Long	6-6-0	10th	
2019-20	Marc Long		9th	

== Notable former team members ==
Graeme Brewer

Wally Ris

Bowen Stassforth

Rafal Szukala

Artur Wojdat
