= 2002 European Junior Swimming Championships =

Water sport competitions

The 2002 European Junior Swimming Championships were held from 11–14 July 2002 in Linz, Austria.

== Medal table ==
Rank	Nation	Gold	Silver	Bronze	Total
1	Russia (RUS)	16	11	4	31
2	Germany (GER)	6	3	6	15
3	Hungary (HUN)	4	5	3	12
4	France (FRA)	3	3	1	7
5	Austria (AUT)	2	0	0	2
6	Poland (POL)	1	3	3	7
7	Italy (ITA)	1	2	5	8
8	Great Britain (GBR)	1	2	4	7
9	Yugoslavia (FR Yugoslavia)	1	2	0	3
10	Ukraine (UKR)	1	1	3	5
11	Croatia (CRO)	1	0	1	2
11	Greece (GRE)	1	0	1	2
13	Sweden (SWE)	0	4	1	5
14	Finland (FIN)	0	1	2	3
15	Czech Republic (CZE)	0	1	1	2
16	Slovenia (SLO)	0	1	0	1
17	Lithuania (LTU)	0	0	1	1
17	Portugal (POR)	0	0	1	1
Totals (18 entries)		38	39	37	114

== Medal summary ==
=== Boy's events ===
Event	Gold		Silver		Bronze	
50 m freestyle	Milorad Čavić; Yugoslavia	22.74	Jonas Tilly; Sweden	23.06	Matti Rajakylä; Finland	23.33
100 m freestyle	Fabien Gilot; France	50.47	Milorad Čavić; Yugoslavia	50.49	Paulius Viktoravicius; Lithuania	50.84
200 m freestyle	Yury Prilukov; Russia	1:50.26	Evgeny Natsvin; Russia	1:52.27	Fabien Gilot; France	1:52.36
400 m freestyle	Yury Prilukov; Russia	3:53.59	David Davies; Great Britain	3:54.83	Evgeny Natsvin; Russia	3:56.64
1500 m freestyle	Yury Prilukov; Russia	15:14.85	Paweł Korzeniowski; Poland	15:36.49	Simone Della Valle; Italy	15:36.51
50 m backstroke	Arkady Vyatchanin; Russia	26.64	Manu Mäntymäki; Finland	26.65	Dominik Keil; Germany	26.73
100 m backstroke	Dominik Keil; Germany	56.09	Arkady Vyatchanin; Russia	56.91	Manu Mäntymäki; Finland	57.18
200 m backstroke	Arkady Vyatchanin; Russia	2:02.81	Ross Hughes; Great Britain	2:03.42	Helge Meeuw; Germany	2:04.61
50 m breaststroke	Alessandro Terrin; Italy	29.11	Joakim Nielsen; Sweden	29.24	Philipp Cool; Germany	29.28
100 m breaststroke	Philipp Cool; Germany	1:03.25	Joakim Nielsen; Sweden	1:03.73	Ihor Borysyk; Ukraine	1:04.13
200 m breaststroke	Łukasz Boral; Poland	2:17.08	Paolo Bossini; Italy	2:17.82	Henrique Pereira Neiva; Portugal	2:18.32
50 m butterfly	Alexei Puninski; Croatia	24.57	Nikolay Skvortsov; Russia; Tor Sundin; Sweden	24.67	none	
100 m butterfly	Sergiy Advena; Ukraine	53.76	Milorad Čavić; Yugoslavia	54.08	Nikolay Skvortsov; Russia	54.15
200 m butterfly	Ioannis Drymonakos; Greece	1:59.25	Lukasz Drzewinski; Poland	2:00.21	Sergiy Advena; Ukraine	2:00.25
200 m individual medley	Igor Berezutskiy; Russia	2:03.65	Alexey Zatsepin; Russia	2:04.92	Andrea Savino; Italy	2:05.35
400 m individual medley	Igor Berezutskiy; Russia	4:19.81	László Cseh; Hungary	4:20.24	Ioannis Drymonakos; Greece	4:26.55
4×100 m freestyle relay	France (51.76) Antoine Galavtine (50.87) Grégory Mallet (51.95) Sebastien Bodet (49.54) Fabien Gilot	3:24.12; CR	Germany (52.55) Axel Könneker (50.70) Johannes Dietrich (51.52) Gregor Fleischer (51.53) Helge Meeuw	3:26.30	Sweden (52.28) Magnus Kjellberg (51.13) Jonas Tilly (51.68) Marcus Piehl (51.82) Rickard Piehl	3:26.91
4×200 m freestyle relay	Russia (1:53.98) Alexey Zatsepin (1:53.55) Igor Berezutskiy (1:52.34) Evgeny Natsvin (1:48.38) Igor Prilukov	7:28.25; CR	France (1:53.73) Sebastien Bodet (1:53.46) Guillaume Strohmeyer (1:52.27) Yoann Soldermann (1:50.70) Fabien Gilot	7:30.16	Great Britain (1:52.69) David Davies (1:53.73) Martin Webster (1:53.66) Paul Webster (1:52.61) Ross Davenport	7:32.69
4×100 m medley relay	Germany (57.10) Dominik Keil (1:02.89) Philipp Cool (53.46) Johannes Dietrich (51.54) Helge Meeuw	3:44.99	Russia (57.68) Arkady Vyatchanin (1:04.95) Andrei Grigoryev (53.26) Nikolay Skvortsov (51.60) Alexey Zatsepin	3:47.49	Hungary (57.29) László Cseh (1:03.74) Gábor Financsek (55.53) Gergely Meszaros (51.95) Mate Bunda	3:48.31

=== Girl's events ===
Event	Gold		Silver		Bronze	
50 m freestyle	Daniela Götz; Germany	25.76	Agata Korc; Poland	25.86	Nele Hofmann; Germany	26.26
100 m freestyle	Nele Hofmann; Germany	56.73	Regina Sych; Russia	56.92	Agata Korc; Poland	57.16
200 m freestyle	Polina Shornikova; Russia	2:02.40	Regina Sych; Russia	2:03.55	Silvia Pagliarini; Italy	2:04.17
400 m freestyle	Regina Sych; Russia	4:15.43	Polina Shornikova; Russia	4:15.58	Krisztina Lipcsei; Hungary	4:19.25
800 m freestyle	Yana Tolkacheva; Russia	8:43.64	Réka Nagy; Hungary	8:43.71	Keri-Anne Payne; Great Britain	8:44.47
50 m backstroke	Stanislava Komarova; Russia	29.34; CR	Laure Manaudou; France	29.45	Sanja Jovanović; Croatia	29.68
100 m backstroke	Laure Manaudou; France	1:01.88	Stanislava Komarova; Russia	1:02.35	Iryna Amshennikova; Ukraine	1:03.12
200 m backstroke	Stanislava Komarova; Russia	2:11.56	Iryna Amshennikova; Ukraine	2:14.29	Stephanie Backhaus; Germany	2:17.81
50 m breaststroke	Kate Haywood; Great Britain	32.54	Tamara Sambrailo; Slovenia	32.62	Petra Chocova; Czech Republic	32.64
100 m breaststroke	Mirna Jukić; Austria	1:09.91	Petra Chocova; Czech Republic	1:10.83	Kate Haywood; Great Britain	1:11.06
200 m breaststroke	Mirna Jukić; Austria	2:26.42; CR	Diana Remenyi; Hungary	2:30.27	Ksenia Vereshchagina; Russia	2:30.85
50 m butterfly	Vasilisa Vladykina; Russia	27.18	Franziska Skrubel; Germany	27.76	Agata Korc; Poland	27.85
100 m butterfly	Kata Taray; Hungary	1:02.19	Renata Papp; Hungary	1:02.53	Elena Gemo; Italy	1:02.67
200 m butterfly	Krisztina Lipcsei; Hungary	2:13.45	Renata Papp; Hungary	2:14.50	Sabina Mussi; Italy	2:17.08
200 m individual medley	Diana Remenyi; Hungary	2:16.35	Laure Manaudou; France	2:17.03	Yana Tolkacheva; Russia	2:17.16
400 m individual medley	Diana Remenyi; Hungary	4:46.20	Yana Tolkacheva; Russia	4:46.83	Stephanie Hantke; Germany	4:54.86
4×100 m freestyle relay	Germany (57.23) Nele Hofmann (57.29) Susanne Kranz (58.02) Katrin Dame (56.42) Daniela Götz	3:48.96	Russia (57.87) Vasilisa Vladykina (58.22) Polina Shornikova (56.98) Yana Tolkacheva (57.52) Regina Sych	3:50.59	Poland (57.29) Paulina Barzycka (58.33) Aleksandra Urbanczyk (59.95) Katarzyna Staszak (55.75) Agata Korc	3:51.32
4×200 m freestyle relay	Russia (2:05.48) Kira Volodina (2:03.16) Polina Shornikova (2:02.70) Regina Sych (2:03.25) Yana Tolkacheva	8:14.59	Italy (2:04.64) Renata Caleca (2:03.73) Silvia Florio (2:04.50) Silvia Pagliarini (2:04.51) Marina Suttora	8:17.38	Great Britain (2:06.41) Katherine Wyld (2:08.57) Laura Chase (2:02.81) Natalie Prince (2:03.84) Keri-Anne Payne	8:21.63
4×100 m medley relay	Russia (1:02.04) Stanislava Komarova (1:12.03) Ksenia Vereshchagina (1:01.36) Vasilisa Vladykina (56.98) Regina Sych	4:12.41; CR	Germany (1:04.15) Julia Baum (1:12.31) Franziska Steinmetz (1:02.75) Franziska Skrubel (55.86) Nele Hofmann	4:15.07	Hungary (1:03.98) Nikolett Szepesi (1:11.00) Diana Remenyi (1:02.91) Kata Taray (58.55) Renata Papp	4:16.44
