= 2001 European Junior Swimming Championships =

Water sport competitions

The 2001 European Junior Swimming Championships were held in Valletta, Malta 5–8 July.

== Medal table ==
Rank	Nation	Gold	Silver	Bronze	Total
1	Hungary (HUN)	9	5	0	14
2	Russia (RUS)	4	5	7	16
3	Germany (GER)	3	4	9	16
4	Greece (GRE)	3	0	3	6
5	Austria (AUT)	3	0	0	3
5	Belarus (BLR)	3	0	0	3
5	Croatia (CRO)	3	0	0	3
8	France (FRA)	2	5	2	9
9	Netherlands (NED)	2	3	1	6
10	Italy (ITA)	2	1	2	5
11	Great Britain (GBR)	2	0	0	2
12	Yugoslavia (FR Yugoslavia)	1	1	0	2
13	Denmark (DEN)	1	0	1	2
14	Ukraine (UKR)	0	5	4	9
15	Spain (ESP)	0	3	0	3
16	Slovenia (SLO)	0	2	2	4
17	Poland (POL)	0	2	0	2
18	Romania (ROM)	0	1	1	2
19	Macedonia	0	1	0	1
20	Czech Republic (CZE)	0	0	1	1
20	Estonia (EST)	0	0	1	1
20	Iceland (ISL)	0	0	1	1
20	Portugal (POR)	0	0	1	1
20	Sweden (SWE)	0	0	1	1
20	Switzerland (SWI)	0	0	1	1
Totals (25 entries)		38	38	38	114

== Results ==
=== Boy's events ===
Event	Gold		Silver		Bronze	
50 m freestyle	Duje Draganja; Croatia	23.05	Germain Cayette; France	23.34	Benjamin Friedrich; Germany	23.49
100 m freestyle	Duje Draganja; Croatia	49.95	Maxim Skrynnikov; Russia	51.11	Martin Skacha; Czech Republic	51.52
200 m freestyle	Denis Rodkin; Russia	1:51.77	Olaf Wildeboer; Spain	1:51.91	Paul Alain Kersale; France	1:52.01
400 m freestyle	Yuri Prilukov; Russia	3:57.33	Philipp Moeller; Germany	3:58.17	Andreas Zisimos; Greece	3:58.50
1500 m freestyle	Guy Noël Schmitt; France	15:30.40	Javier Nunez Molano; Spain	15:39.75	Andreas Zisimos; Greece	15:41.90
50 m backstroke	Viktor Bodrogi; Hungary	26.19	Pavlo Illichov; Ukraine	26.81	Flori Lang; Switzerland	26.84
100 m backstroke	Viktor Bodrogi; Hungary	56.03	Andrey Oleynik; Ukraine	57.23	Enrico Catalano; Italy	57.38
200 m backstroke	Viktor Bodrogi; Hungary	1:59.29	Andrey Oleynik; Ukraine	2:03.56	Arkady Vyatchanin; Russia	2:03.98
50 m breaststroke	Sergey Lybunov; Russia	29.25	Matjaz Markic; Slovenia	29.29	Jon Oddur Sigurdsson; Iceland	29.44
100 m breaststroke	Thijs van Valkengoed; Netherlands	1:03.67	Sergey Lybunov; Russia	1:04.16	Jan Papenbrock; Germany	1:04.57
200 m breaststroke	Thijs van Valkengoed; Netherlands	2:16.01	Alexsei Tiurin; Russia	2:17.44	Vladimir Labzin; Estonia	2:17.72
50 m butterfly	Duje Draganja; Croatia	24.58	Milorad Cavic; Yugoslavia	24.66	Sergey Advena; Ukraine	24.85
100 m butterfly	Milorad Cavic; Yugoslavia	54.18	Sergey Adveba; Ukraine	54.66	Lief-Marten Krueger; Germany	54.86
200 m butterfly	Ioannis Drymonakos; Greece	1:59.51	Viktor Bodrogi; Hungary	1:59.75	Sergey Advena; Ukraine	2:01.65
200 m individual medley	James Goddard; Great Britain	2:02.66	Nick van der Zandt; Netherlands	2:04.53	Igor Berezuckij; Russia	2:05.44
400 m individual medley	James Goddard; Great Britain	4:19.30	Pierre Henri; France	4:21.39	Vasilios Demetis; Greece	4:22.32
4×100 m freestyle relay	Germany; Helge Meuw; Thomas Reuter; Robert Welzl; Lief-Marten Krueger	3:26.68	France; Gregory Mallet; Germain Cayette; Clement Vanhack; Paul Alain Kersale	3:27.05	Russia; Evgeny Korotshykin; Yuri Ufimitsev; Taras Kit; Maxim Skrynnikov	3:28.37
4×200 m freestyle relay	France; Paul Alain Kersale; Matthieu Madelaine; Pierre Henri; Guy Noel Schmitt	7:31.15	Germany; Robert Welzl; Thomas Reuter; Helge Meeuw; Philipp Moeller	7:31.72	Russia; Igor Berutscky; Yuri Ufimtsev; Yuri Prilukov; Denis Rodkin	7:31.91
4×100 m medley relay	Hungary; Viktor Bodrogi; Máté Humor; Gergely Mészáros; Máté Bunda	3:46.17	Russia; Arkady Vyatchanin; Sergey Lyubanov; Nikolay Skvortsov; Maxim Skrynnikov	3:48.18	Germany; Helge Meeuw; Jan Papenbrock; Leif-Marten Krueger; Thomas Reuter	3:48.81

=== Girl's events ===
Event	Gold		Silver		Bronze	
50 m freestyle	Aliaksandra Herasimenia; Belarus	25.53	Agata Korc; Poland	25.84	Cristina Tatar; Romania	26.18
100 m freestyle	Aliaksandra Herasimenia; Belarus	56.92	Agata Korc; Poland	57.33	Celina Lemmen; Netherlands	57.47
200 m freestyle	Zoi Dimoschaki; Greece	2:01.94	Celina Lemmen; Netherlands	2:03.26	Ekaterina Nasyrova; Russia	2:03.76
400 m freestyle	Zoi Dimoschaki; Greece	4:11.59	Éva Risztov; Hungary	4:16.17	Olga Beresneva; Ukraine	4:16.43
800 m freestyle	Éva Risztov; Hungary	8:43.37	Olga Beresneva; Ukraine	8:43.78	Daria Belyakina; Russia	8:52.37
50 m backstroke	Aliaksandra Herasimenia; Belarus	29.12	Laure Manaudou; France	29.71	Louise Ørnstedt; Denmark	30.02
100 m backstroke	Louise Ørnstedt; Denmark	1:03.26	Laure Manaudou; France	1:03.66	Iryna Amsennikova; Ukraine	1:04.24
200 m backstroke	Ekaterina Lopareva; Russia	2:16.21	Valentina Brat; Romania	2:16.29	Anja Carman; Slovenia	2:16.57
50 m breaststroke	Mirna Jukic; Austria	32.83	Tamara Sambrailo; Slovenia	33.01	Carolin Boehm; Germany	33.09
100 m breaststroke	Mirna Jukic; Austria	1:10.23	Lisa Schoelhammer; Germany	1:10.90	Tamara Sambrailo; Slovenia	1:11.84
200 m breaststroke	Mirna Jukic; Austria	2:28.41	Diána Reményi; Hungary	2:31.33	Lisa Schoelhammer; Germany	2:31.78
50 m butterfly	Cristina Maccagnola; Italy	27.26	Inge Dekker; Netherlands	27.99	Catherine Friedrich; Germany	28.43
100 m butterfly	Cristina Maccagnola; Italy	1:01.07	Catherine Friedrich; Germany	1:01.65	Sara Oliveira; Portugal	1:02.66
200 m butterfly	Éva Risztov; Hungary	2:13.91	Vesna Stojanovska; Macedonia	2:16.91	Cristina Malagamba; Italy	2:17.22
200 m individual medley	Éva Risztov; Hungary	2:17.82	Katalin Molnár; Hungary	2:18.80	Sophie De Ronchi; France	2:19.33
400 m individual medley	Diána Reményi; Hungary	4:48.51	Eleonora Tafi; Italy	4:51.67	Nina Shiffer; Germany	4:51.80
4×100 m freestyle relay	Germany; Sonja Schober; Catrin Wandzek; Laura Hohmann; Tanja Hachmann-Thiessen	3:50.42	Spain; Maria Fuster Martinez; Esther Bosch Gras; Eunate Alcantrilla Garro; Melissa Caballero Ayasse	3:54.41	Russia; Dinara Mingajdinova; Daria Belyakina; Polina Chernikova; Ekaterina Nasyrova	3:54.47
4×200 m freestyle relay	Hungary; Viktória Molnár; Krisztina Lipcsei; Katalin Molnár; Éva Risztov	8:19.19	Russia; Daria Belyakina; Dinara Mingajdinova; Polina Chernikova; Ekaterina Nasyrova	8:20.91	Germany; Janina Lorenz; Natascha Kraus; Silke Nowotzin; Tanja Hachmann-Thiessen	8:21.45
4×100 m medley relay	Germany; Julia Baum; Lisa Schoelhammer; Catherine Friedrich; Catrin Wandzik	4:14.29	Hungary; Andrea Pálmai; Diána Reményi; Éva Risztov; Viktória Molnár	4:16.86	Sweden; Ida Boerjesson; Caroline Drab; Gabriella Fagundez; Ida Marko-Varga	4:19.21
