= Igor Berezutskiy =

Russian swimmer

Personal information
- Full name: Igor Andreyevich Berezutskiy
- National team: Russia
- Born: 7 June 1984 (age 42) Volgograd, Russian SFSR, Soviet Union
- Height: 1.88 m (6 ft 2 in)
- Weight: 78 kg (172 lb)

Sport
- Sport: Swimming
- Strokes: Freestyle, medley
- Club: Volga Volgograd
- Coach: Viktor Avdeyenko
Medal record
Men's swimming
Representing Russia
World Championships (SC)
Bronze medal – third place	2006 Shanghai	200 m medley
Bronze medal – third place	2006 Shanghai	400 m medley
European Championships (SC)
Bronze medal – third place	2004 Vienna	400 m medley
European Junior Championships
Gold medal – first place	2002 Linz	200 m medley
Gold medal – first place	2002 Linz	400 m medley
Gold medal – first place	2002 Linz	4×200 m freestyle
Bronze medal – third place	2001 Valletta	200 m medley

Igor Andreyevich Berezutskiy (Russian: Игорь Андреевич Березуцкий; born 7 June 1984) is a Russian former swimmer, who specialized in freestyle and individual medley events. He is highly regarded as Russia's top medley swimmer in the 2000s, having won numerous national and junior European titles. He is a member of Volga Swimming Club, and is trained by his long-time coach and mentor Viktor Avdeyenko.

Berezutskiy made his own swimming history at the 2002 European Junior Championships in Linz, Austria, achieving a total of three gold medals. First, he outlasted Hungary's László Cseh in a close race to set a junior European record of 4:19.81 in the 400 m individual medley. Second, he stroked to a personal best of 2:03.65 to claim a title over his teammate Alexei Zatsepine by a 1.27-second margin in the 200 m individual medley. He also helped out his Russian team to break a championship record of 7:28.25 in the 4 × 200 m freestyle relay.

Two years later, Berezutskiy qualified for the men's 400 m individual medley at the 2004 Summer Olympics in Athens, by breaking a Russian record and clearing a FINA A-standard entry time of 4:18.13 from the Russian Championships in Moscow. He challenged seven other swimmers on the final heat of five, including top medal favorite Michael Phelps of the United States. He edged out his teammate and Olympic veteran Alexey Kovrigin to take a seventh spot by 0.57 of a second in 4:23.20. Berezutskiy failed to advance into the final, as he placed twentieth overall on the first day of preliminaries.

Four months after the Olympics, Berezutskiy earned a bronze medal in the same program at the 2004 European Short Course Swimming Championships in Vienna, Austria. He established a short-course personal best of 4:08.91, just nearly five seconds behind winner Cseh, who rivaled him two years before at the European Junior Championships.

At the 2006 FINA World Short Course Championships in Shanghai, China, Berezutskiy won two bronze medals in the 200 (1:56.64) and 400 m individual medley (4:06.81).

In 2007, Berezutskiy announced his retirement from swimming for personal, health, and psychological reasons.
