= Żmija =

Żmija or Zmija may refer to:

- Żmija Group, a group of military units of Polish WWII Home Army
- Grzegorz Żmija (born 1971), Polish former professional footballer
- Polish title of The Viper (Sapkowski)
- Zmija Facula, bright region on the surface of Mercury
- Zmija, Nickname of Zvezdan Jovanović
- "Żmija", codename of Polish Long-range Reconnaissance Vehicles program, see LPU Wirus 4
- Father Żmija, a priest and detective from Sandomierz in Polish TV series 1670
