= Andriy Oleynyk =

Ukrainian swimmer (born 1983)

Personal information
- Native name: Андрій Олійник
- Nationality: Ukraine
- Born: October 22, 1983 (age 42) Brovary, Kiev Oblast, Ukrainian SSR, Soviet Union

Sport
- Sport: Swimming
- Strokes: Medley
Medal record
Men's swimming
Representing Ukraine
World Championships (SC)
Bronze medal – third place	2006 Shanghai	4×100 m medley
European Championships (LC)
Silver medal – second place	2006 Budapest	4×100 m medley
European Championships (SC)
Silver medal – second place	2005 Trieste	4×50 m medley
Summer Universiade
Bronze medal – third place	2007 Bangkok	4x100 m medley
Military World Games
Bronze medal – third place	2007 Hyderabad	50 m backstroke
Bronze medal – third place	2007 Hyderabad	4x100 m medley
European Junior Championships
Silver medal – second place	2001 Malta	100 m backstroke
Silver medal – second place	2001 Malta	200 m backstroke

Andriy Oleynyk (born 22 October 1983 in Brovary, Ukraine) is a backstroke and a medley swimmer from Ukraine, who won the bronze medal in the men's 4x100 m medley relay event at the 2006 FINA Short Course World Championships in Shanghai, China.

== Early life and education ==
He was born on 22 October 1983 in Brovary, Ukraine. He studied at the Piddubny Olympic College.

== Career ==
Andriy competed at the 2001 European Junior Swimming Championships, held in Malta, where he won two silver medals in 100 m backstroke and also in 200 m backstroke event.

In the following years, he won a silver medal in 4x50 m medley relay at the 2005 European Short Course Swimming Championships, held in Trieste, Italy. He also earned a silver medal in 4 × 100 m medley relay at the 2006 European Aquatics Championships in Budapest.

In 2006, he won the bronze medal in the men's 4x100 m medley at the 2006 FINA Short Course World Championships in Shanghai, China.

At the 2007 Summer Universiade, held in Bangkok, Andriy reached a bronze medal in 4 × 100 m medley relay. He also won two bronze medals in 50 m backstroke and 4 × 100 m medley relay at the 2007 Military World Games, held in Hyderabad.
