= Aliaksandra Herasimenia =

Belarusian swimmer (born 1985)

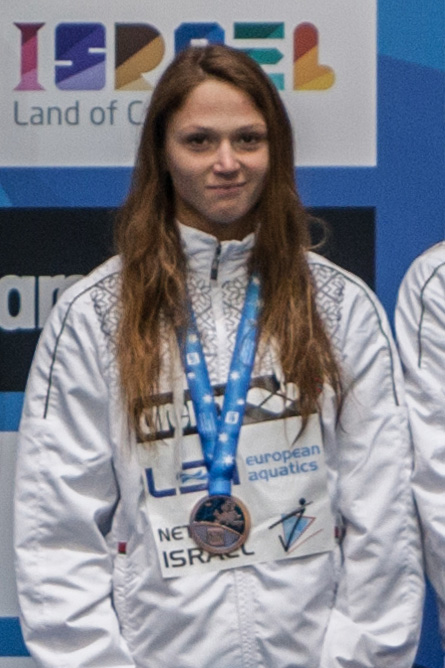
- Herasimenia in 2015

Personal information
- Born: 31 December 1985 (age 40) Minsk, Byelorussian SSR, Soviet Union
- Height: 1.76 m (5 ft 9 in)
- Weight: 55 kg (121 lb)

Sport
- Sport: Swimming
- Strokes: Freestyle, Backstroke
Medal record
Women's swimming
Representing Belarus
Olympic Games
Silver medal – second place	2012 London	50 m freestyle
Silver medal – second place	2012 London	100 m freestyle
Bronze medal – third place	2016 Rio de Janeiro	50 m freestyle
World Championships (LC)
Gold medal – first place	2011 Shanghai	100 m freestyle
Silver medal – second place	2007 Melbourne	50 m backstroke
Bronze medal – third place	2017 Budapest	50 m backstroke
World Championships (SC)
Gold medal – first place	2012 Istanbul	50 m freestyle
European Championships (LC)
Gold medal – first place	2010 Budapest	50 m backstroke
Silver medal – second place	2006 Budapest	50 m backstroke
Silver medal – second place	2010 Budapest	100 m freestyle
Bronze medal – third place	2002 Berlin	50 m freestyle
Bronze medal – third place	2002 Berlin	50 m backstroke
European Championships (SC)
Gold medal – first place	2012 Chartres	50 m freestyle
Silver medal – second place	2002 Rijeka	50 m freestyle
Silver medal – second place	2002 Rijeka	4x50 m freestyle
Silver medal – second place	2009 Istanbul	50 m backstroke
Silver medal – second place	2012 Chartres	50 m butterfly
Bronze medal – third place	2005 Trieste	50 m backstroke
Bronze medal – third place	2009 Istanbul	100 m backstroke
Bronze medal – third place	2012 Chartres	4×50 m freestyle
Bronze medal – third place	2013 Herning	50 m freestyle
Bronze medal – third place	2013 Herning	100 m freestyle
Bronze medal – third place	2015 Netanya	4×50 m mixed medley
Summer Universiade
Gold medal – first place	2009 Belgrade	50 m freestyle
Gold medal – first place	2011 Shenzhen	50 m freestyle
Gold medal – first place	2013 Kazan	50 m freestyle
Gold medal – first place	2013 Kazan	100 m freestyle
Gold medal – first place	2013 Kazan	50 m butterfly
Silver medal – second place	2007 Bangkok	50 m freestyle
Silver medal – second place	2007 Bangkok	50 m backstroke
Silver medal – second place	2009 Belgrade	100 m freestyle
Silver medal – second place	2011 Shenzhen	50 m backstroke
Silver medal – second place	2013 Kazan	50 m backstroke
Bronze medal – third place	2009 Belgrade	50 m backstroke
Bronze medal – third place	2011 Shenzhen	100 m backstroke
European Junior Championships
Gold medal – first place	2001 Malta	50 m backstroke
Gold medal – first place	2001 Malta	50 m freestyle
Gold medal – first place	2001 Malta	100 m freestyle
Silver medal – second place	2000 Dunkerque	50 m backstroke

Aliaksandra Viktarauna Herasimenia (Note: Belarusian: Аляксандра Віктараўна Герасіменя Russian: Алекса́ндра Ви́кторовна Герасиме́ня; Łacinka: Aliaksandra Viktaraŭna Hierasimienia / Aleksandra Gerasimenya) (born 31 December 1985) is a Belarusian former swimmer.

After a medal-winning career, including gold at the 2012 World Championships and silver at the 2012 London Olympics, she became a critic of the Lukashenko regime in Belarus, and now lives in exile in Poland.

== Swimming career ==
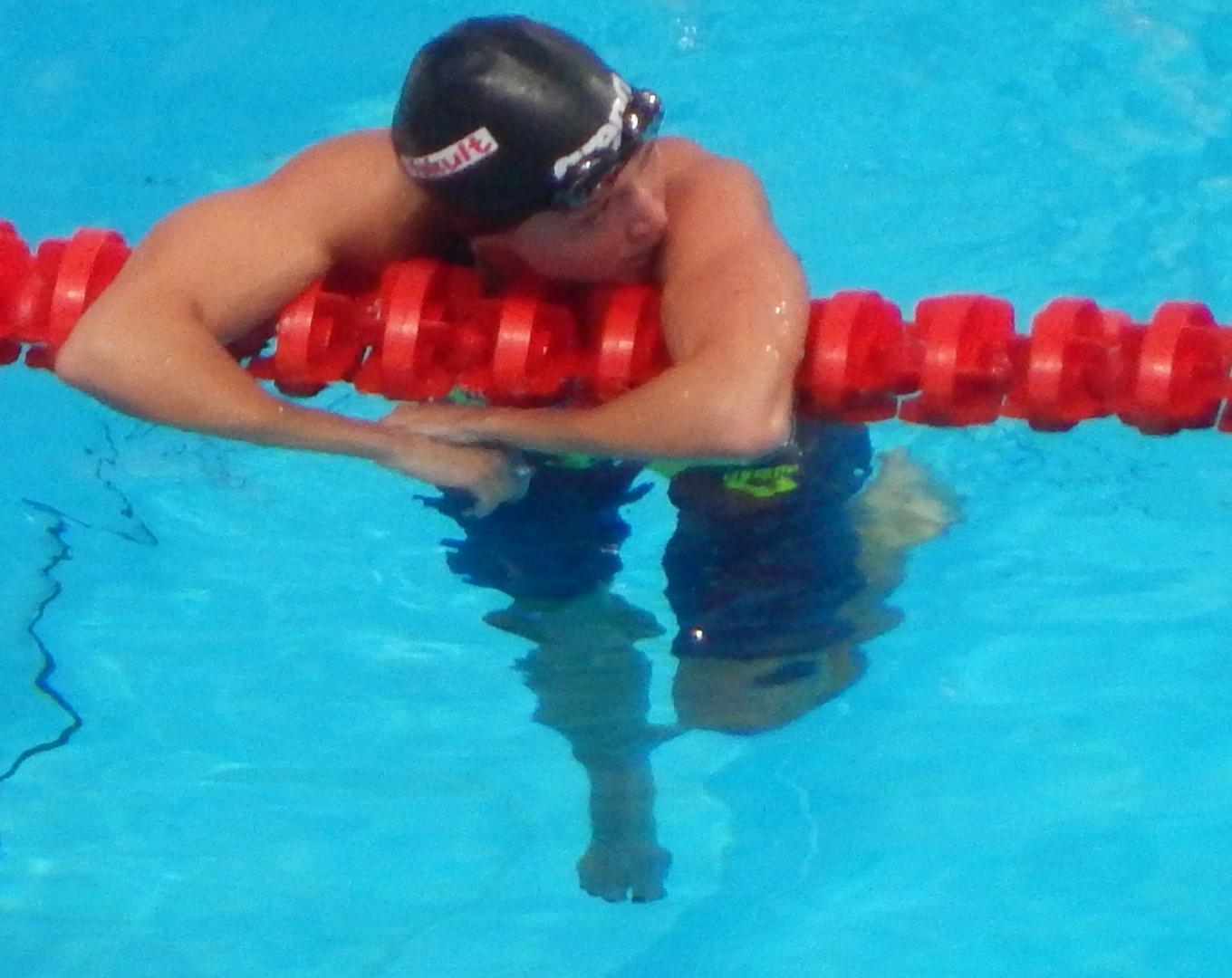
Kazan 2015

She is 2 times olympic runner-up (2012 London) in the 50-meter freestyle and 100-meter freestyle, Olympic bronze medalist (2016 Rio de Janeiro) in the 50-meter freestyle, World Champion (2011 Shanghai) in the 100-meter freestyle, World Champion (25m pool) (2012 Istanbul) in the 50-meter freestyle, European Champion (2010 Budapest) in the 50-meter backstroke, and 3 consecutive times Universiade Champion (2009 Belgrade, 2011 Shenzhen and 2013 Kazan) in the 50-meter freestyle.

Despite a two-year ban for a positive test for norandrosterone in 2003, Herasimenia returned to win gold medals at both the European and World Championships.

At the 2011 World Aquatics Championships, she won the gold medal in the 100-meter freestyle, tied with Jeanette Ottesen of Denmark in a time of 53.45.

At the 2012 Summer Olympics, she won silver medals in the 50 and 100-meter freestyle events.

== Belarusian political activity ==
During the 2020 Belarusian protests, Herasimenia was responsible for youth and sports in National Anti-crisis Management, a shadow government created by the Belarusian Coordination Council for the peaceful transfer of power following the 2020 Belarusian presidential election.

Herasimenia is a founder of the Belarusian Sport Solidarity Foundation (BSSF), a group that supports athletes jailed or sidelined for their political views. In April 2021, she sold her 2012 world championship gold medal to raise funds for the foundation and for legal fees after facing charges from the Belarus Government for criticising them on social media.

She was one of the supporters of Belarusian sprinter Krystsina Tsimanouskaya, who was threatened with enforced return to Belarus from the Tokyo Olympics after criticising team coaches. Herasimenia sought assistance for Tsimanouskaya from a number of European embassies.

In March 2022 Herasimenia stated her opposition to the Belarusian government’s involvement in the 2022 Russian invasion of Ukraine: “Ukraine has never been our enemy, it is our fraternal people."

On 26 December 2022, Herasimenia was sentenced in absentia by the Minsk City Court to 12 years in prison.

== See also ==
- Swimming at the 2009 World Aquatics Championships
- 2010 European Aquatics Championships
- Swimming at the 2011 World Aquatics Championships
- Swimming at the 2012 Summer Olympics
- Swimming at the 2016 Summer Olympics
