= Bodet =

Bodet is a surname. Notable people with the surname include:

- Catherine Bodet (born 1945), known as Catherine Lara, French violinist, composer, singer and author
- Jaime Torres Bodet (1902–1974), Mexican politician
- Sébastien Bodet (born 1985), French Olympic swimmer
- Stéphanie Bodet (born 1976), French rock climber and writer

== See also ==
- Bodett
