= Zgorzelec =

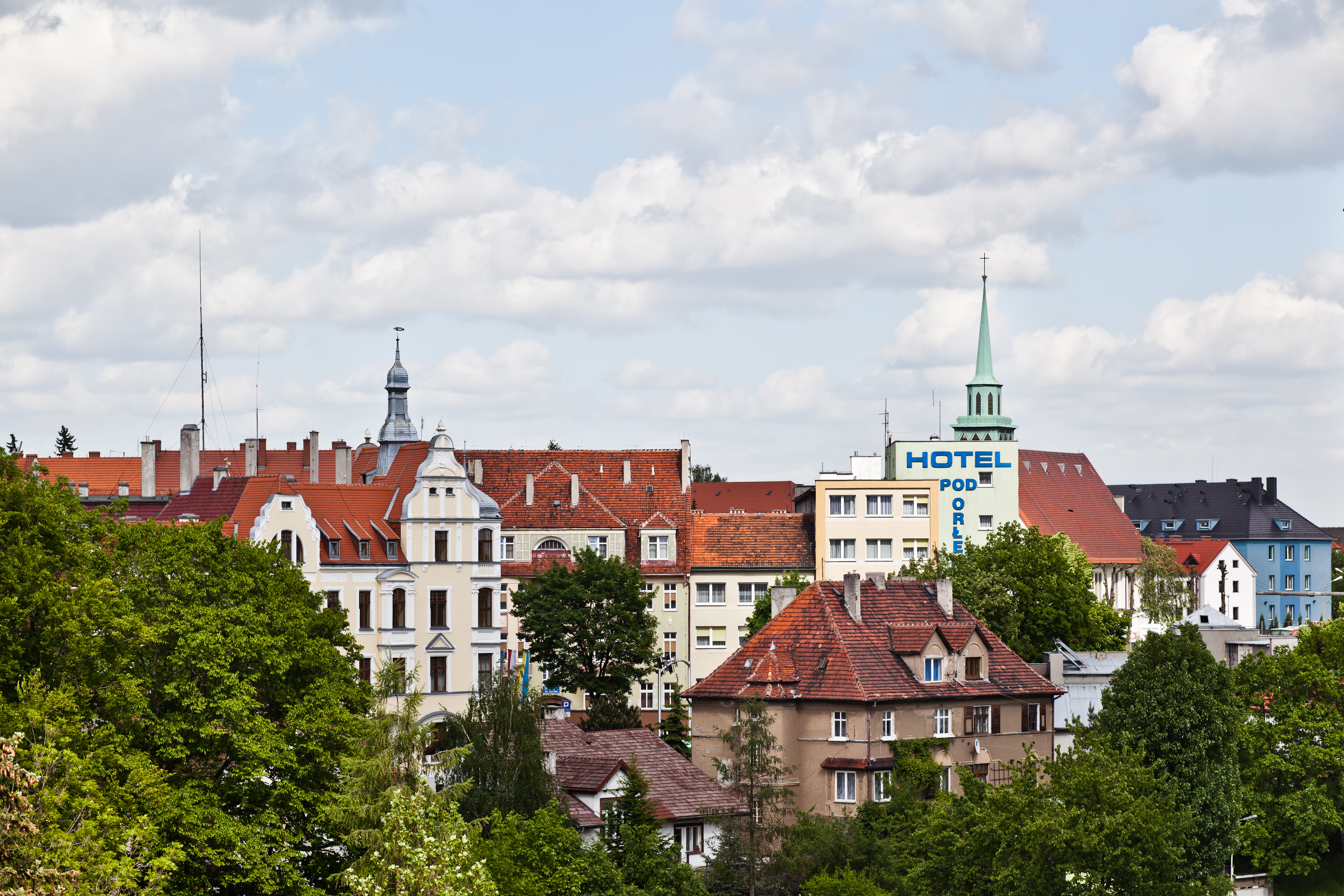
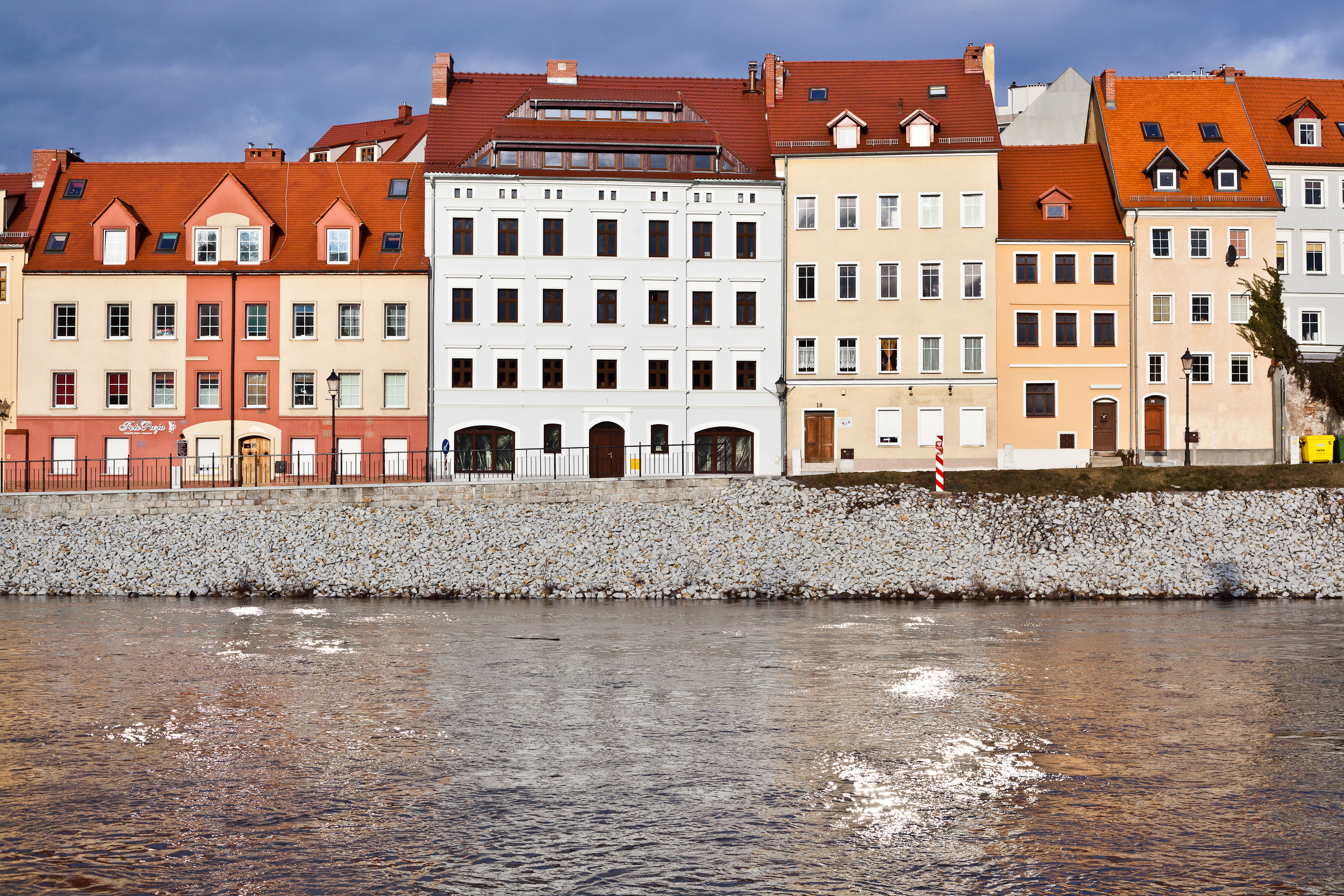
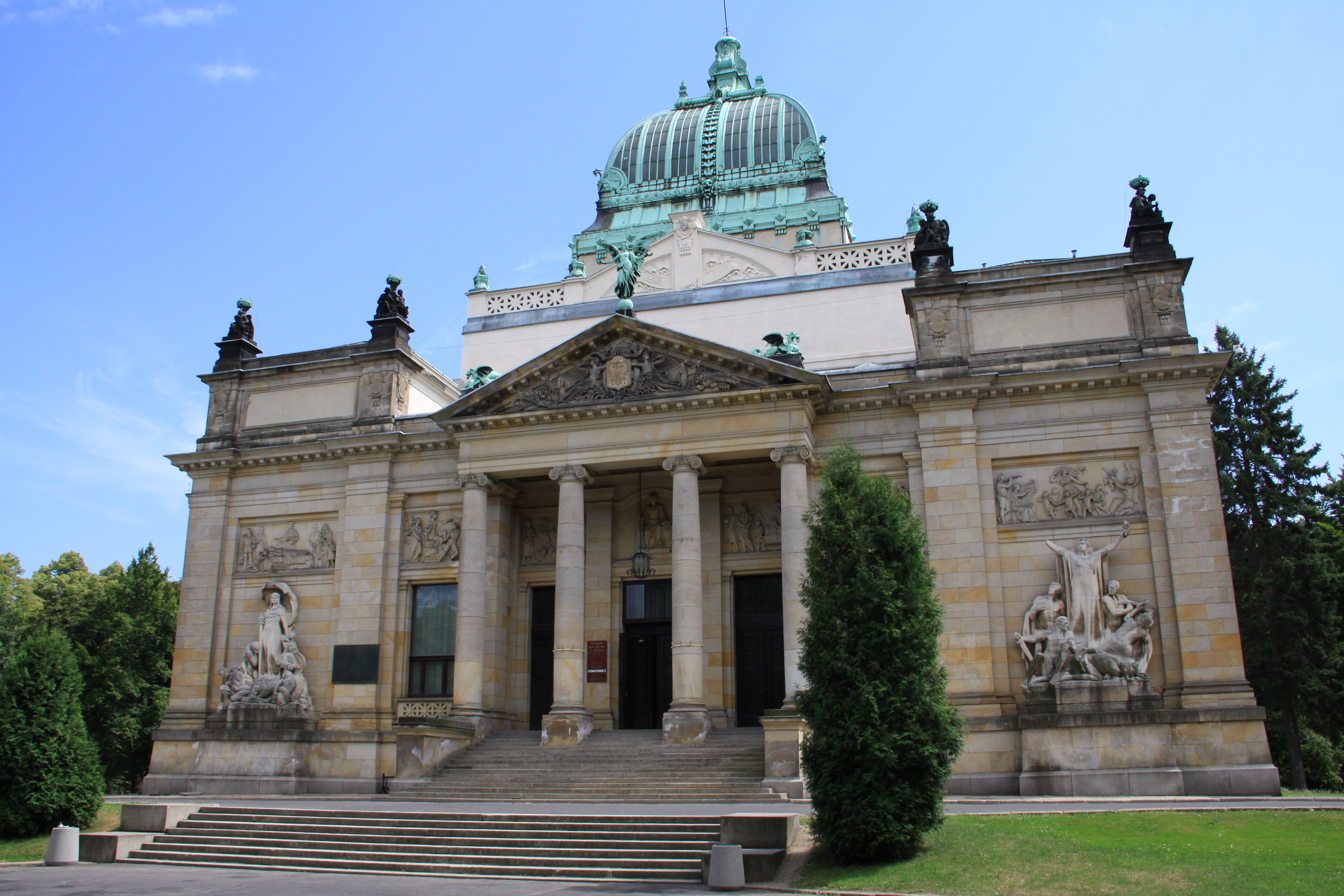
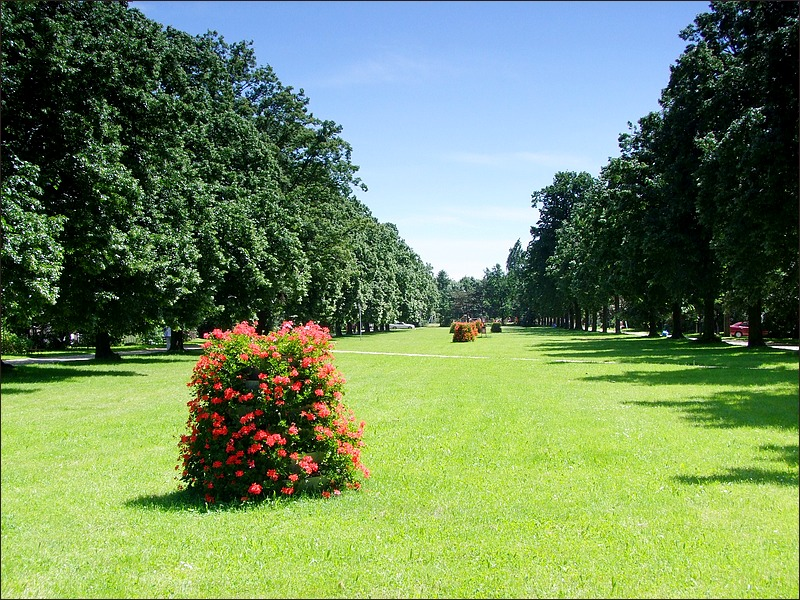
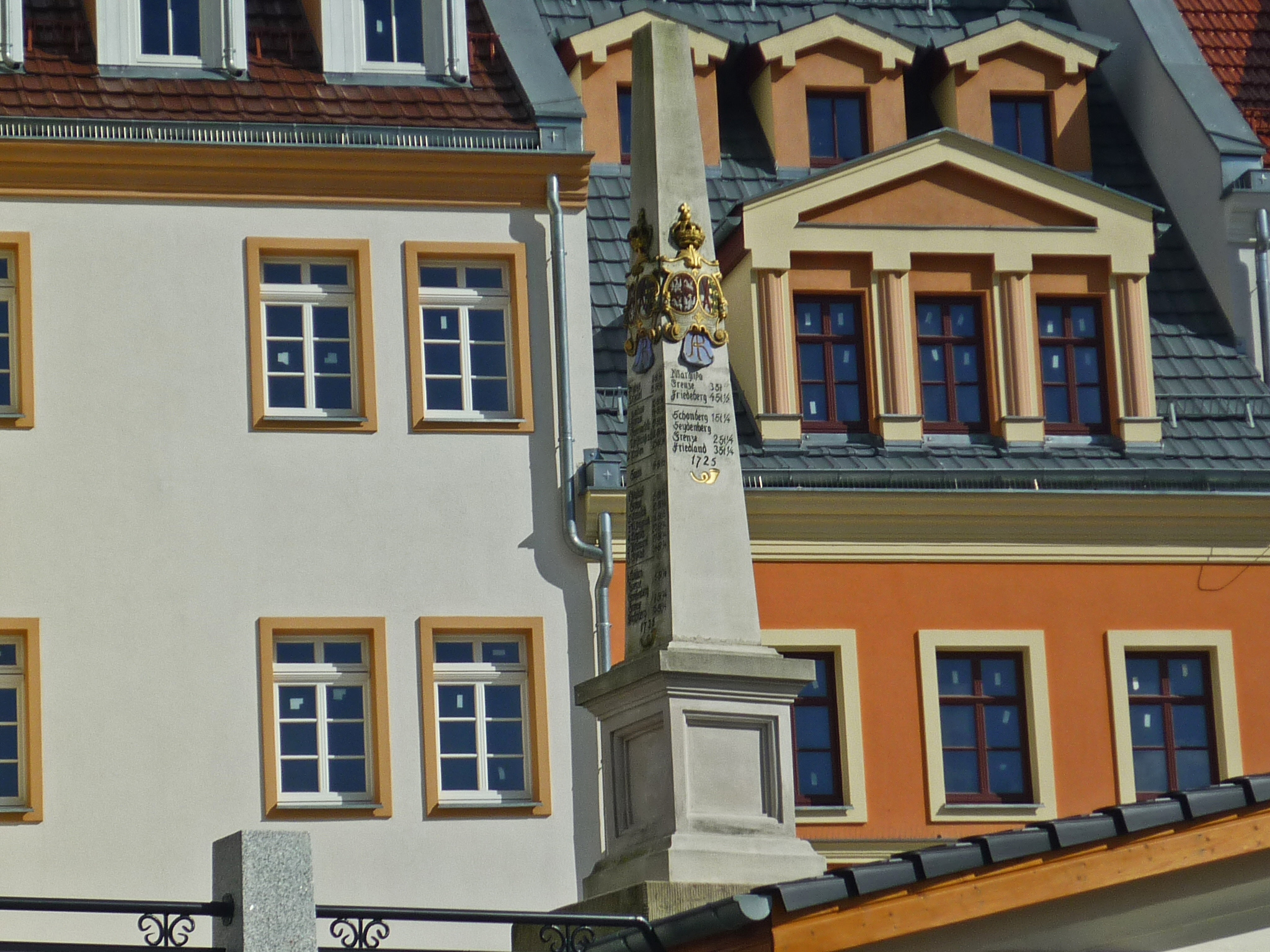
- Panorama of the city Daszyńskiego Street Municipal House of Culture Paderewski Park Polish-Saxon post milestone

- Flag Coat of arms
- Interactive map of Zgorzelec
- Location within Poland
- Coordinates: 51°09′00″N 15°00′30″E
- Country: Poland
- Voivodeship: Lower Silesian
- County: Zgorzelec
- Gmina: Zgorzelec (urban gmina)

Government
  - Mayor: Rafał Gronicz (KO)

Area
  - Total: 15.88 km^{2} (6.13 sq mi)

Population (2019-06-30)
  - Total: 30,374
  - Density: 1,913/km^{2} (4,954/sq mi)
- Time zone: UTC+1 (CET)
  - Summer (DST): UTC+2 (CEST)
- Postal code: 59–900 to 59–903
- Car plates: DZG
- Climate: Cfb
- Website: zgorzelec.eu

Zgorzelec ([zɡɔˈʐɛlɛt͡s], German: Görlitz, (Note: After the war, the German name Görlitz usually refers only to the western, German part of the city.) Upper Sorbian: Zhorjelc [ˈzhɔʁʲɛlts], Czech: Zhořelec, Lower Sorbian: Zgórjelc) is a town in Lower Silesian Voivodeship, in southwestern Poland, with 30,374 inhabitants (2019). It is the seat of Zgorzelec County and of Gmina Zgorzelec (although it is not part of the territory of the latter, as the town is an urban gmina in its own right).

Zgorzelec is located on the Lusatian Neisse river, on the Polish-German border adjoining the German town of Görlitz, of which it constituted the eastern part up to 1945. Through its history it has been at various times under German, Polish, and Czech rule. In recent history, it became known as the location of a major German-operated prisoner-of-war camp for Allied soldiers of various nationalities during World War II, the place of signing of the Treaty of Zgorzelec, and the home of the successful Turów Zgorzelec basketball team, which played in the Euroleague and EuroCup.

== History ==
Up until 1945, the modern-day towns of Zgorzelec and Görlitz were a single entity; their history up to that point is shared. The date of the town's foundation is unknown.

=== Middle Ages ===
In the Early Middle Ages, the area was inhabited by the Bieżuńczanie tribe, one of the old Polish tribes, which together with the Sorbian Milceni tribe, with which it bordered in the west, was subjugated in 990 by the Margraviate of Meissen, a frontier march of the Holy Roman Empire. It was conquered by Polish Duke, and future King, Bolesław I the Brave in 1002, whose goal was to decisively unite all Polish tribes, and remained part of Poland during the reign of the first Polish kings Bolesław I the Brave and Mieszko II Lambert until 1031, when the region fell again to the Margraviate of Meissen. Zgorzelec/Görlitz was first mentioned in a document from the King of Germany, and later Holy Roman Emperor, Henry IV in 1071 as a small village named Goreliz in the region of Upper Lusatia. In 1075, the region, within the Holy Roman Empire, passed to rule of the Duchy of Bohemia (kingdom from 1198). In the 13th century the village gradually turned into a town. It became rich due to its location on the Via Regia, an ancient and medieval trade road. In 1319 it became part of the Piast-ruled Duchy of Jawor, the southwesternmost duchy of fragmented Poland, and later on, became part of Bohemia and the Holy Roman Empire again.

In the following centuries, from 1346, it was a wealthy member of the Six-City League of Upper Lusatia, consisting of the six Lusatian cities Bautzen, Görlitz, Kamenz, Lubań, Löbau and Zittau. The town of Gorlice in southern Poland was founded during the reign of Casimir the Great in 1354 by ethnic German colonists from Görlitz, in the last phases of eastward settlement by Germans (in this case by Walddeutsche). In the conflict over the Bohemian throne between George of Poděbrady and Matthias Corvinus, Görlitz, along with the Lusatian League, recognized Corvinus as ruler between 1469 and 1490. The town brokered international trade between German states in the west and Poland, Lithuania, Hungary and Muscovy in the east, and in 1510 King Sigismund I the Old allowed free trade in all of Poland and Lithuania for the town.

=== Modern period ===
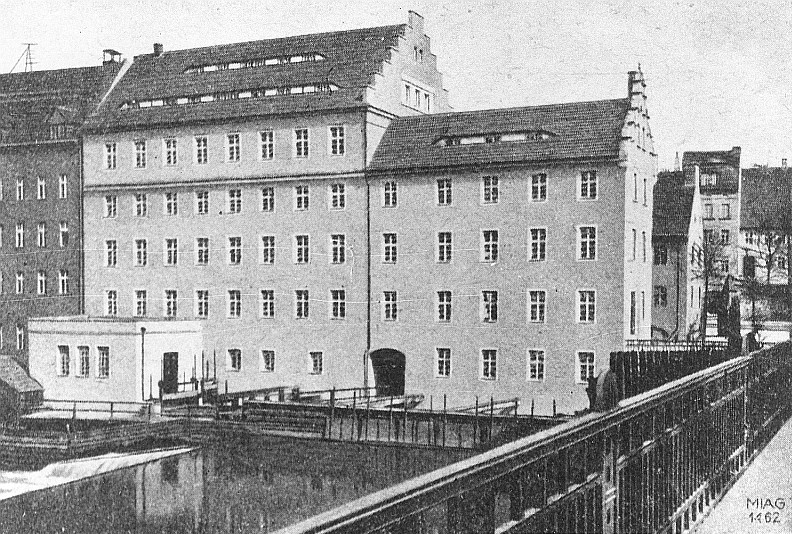
The Tricycle Mill in the 1920s

After suffering for years in the Thirty Years' War, the region of Upper Lusatia (including Görlitz) passed to Saxony (1635), whose Electors were also Kings of Poland from 1697. One of the two main routes connecting Warsaw and Dresden ran through the city at that time.

In 1815, after the Napoleonic Wars, the Congress of Vienna awarded Görlitz to the Kingdom of Prussia and subsequently the city became part of the German Empire in 1871. The city was a part of the Prussian province of Silesia from 1815 to 1919.

=== 20th century ===
During World War I, the Germans operated a prisoner-of-war camp in present-day Zgorzelec, in which initially Russian, French and British POWs were held, and then from 1916 to 1919 around 6,500 Greek soldiers were interned. After the abolition of the Kingdom of Prussia in the aftermath of World War I, Görlitz became a part of the newly established Province of Lower Silesia in the Free State of Prussia.

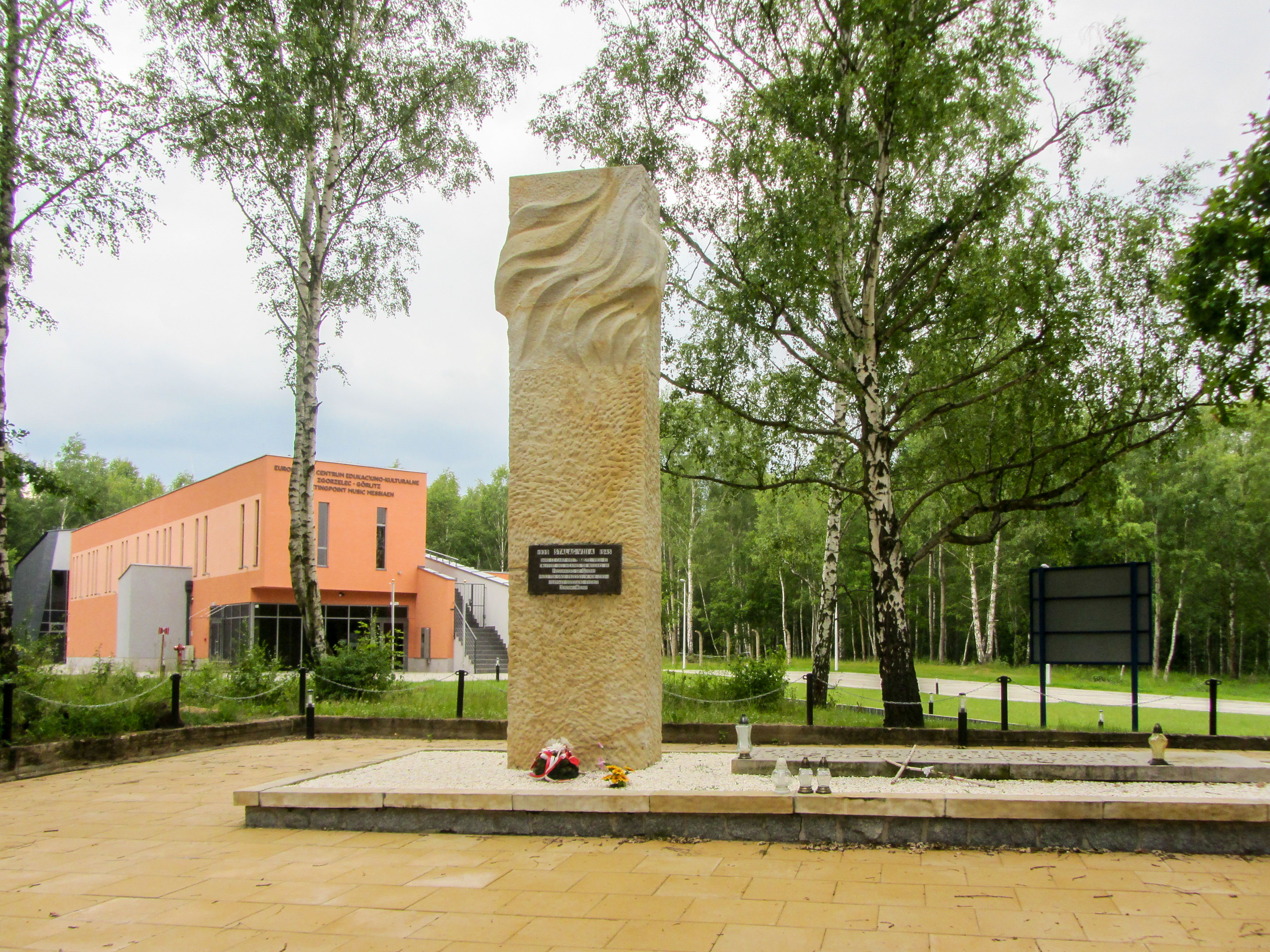
Memorial to the victims of the German Stalag VIII-A POW camp

On 26 August 1939, a few days before Germany invaded Poland and sparked World War II, a temporary prisoner-of-war camp intended for Poles was established in present-day Zgorzelec, which was soon converted into the large Stalag VIII-A POW camp. The first 8,000 Polish POWs were brought to the camp on 7 September 1939. Also Polish civilians, including women, were held in the camp, which served as a transit camp for Poles, who were deported to Germany either to forced labour or to Nazi concentration camps. Among them were especially Polish activists and intelligentsia from Silesia, Greater Poland and Pomerania, arrested during the Intelligenzaktion. After being brought to the town in freight trains, the prisoners were marched from the train station to the camp, while the local German population and Hitler Youth stood in lines and insulted them. Poor sanitary conditions led to frequent epidemic outbreaks in the camp. During the war also POWs of various other nationalities were held in the camp, including the Czechs, Lithuanians, Jews, French, Belgians, Russians, Italians, Britons, Canadians, Australians, New Zealanders, South Africans, Yugoslavs, Slovaks, Americans. The French composer Olivier Messiaen was one of its inmates. Most POWs were evacuated by the Germans in February 1945 in a death march, during which POWs who either were unable to walk or tried to escape were murdered. In November 1941, also the Stalag 368 POW camp was founded in the town, but was relocated to Beniaminów in the following months.

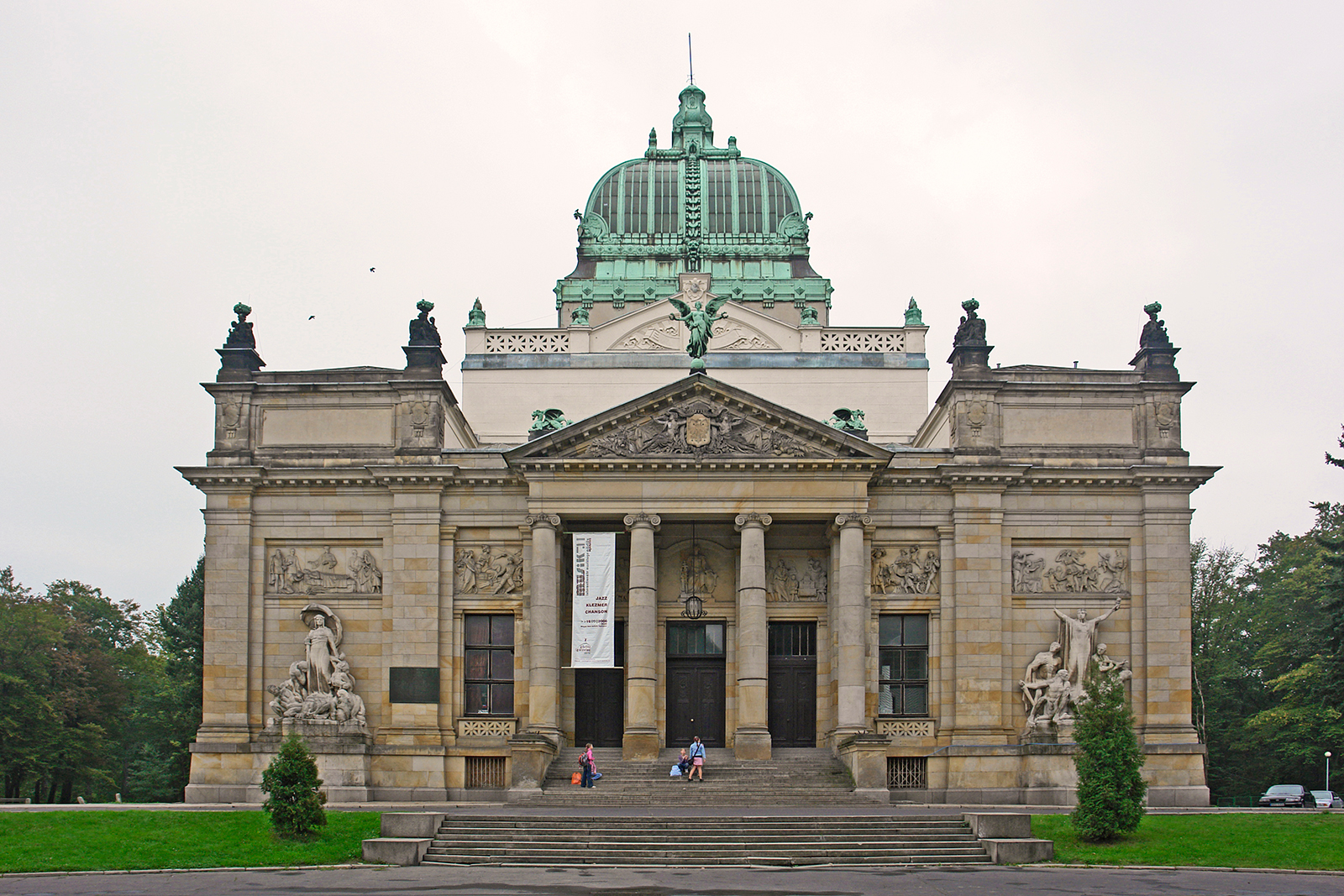
Miejski Dom Kultury is one of the cultural and community centers of Zgorzelec, and the place of signing of the Treaty of Zgorzelec

In the wake of German defeat, operation groups arrived in the town on 10 to 12 May 1945 on the right Oder bank of Görlitz to secure Polish takeover of the town district. Polish administration was officially implemented on 21 May. On 2 June 1945, Polish military closed the bridge in Görlitz to block Germans from returning to their homes in Silesia. Early in the morning on 21 June, the Polish ordered the Germans to leave their homes on the eastern part of Görlitz.

The Potsdam Conference confirmed Polish rule and henceforth, the Oder-Neisse line as the Polish-East German border divided Görlitz (lying on the Lusatian Neisse) between the two countries. The German part retained the name Görlitz, while the Polish part was initially known by its other historic Polish name Zgorzelice, later changed to the also historic name Zgorzelec. Polish and Greek settlers arrived in the town. Zgorzelec had a difficult start as a Polish town because almost all of the infrastructure facilities were located in the part remaining German. The Treaty of Zgorzelec, between Poland and East Germany, was signed in the town's community center in 1950.

Starting in 1948, some 10,000 Greek refugees of the Greek Civil War, mainly communist partisans, were allowed into Poland and settled mainly in Zgorzelec. There were Greek schools, a Greek retirement home, and even a factory reserved for Greek employees. The majority of these refugees later returned to Greece, but a part remains to this day (see Greeks in Poland). The Greek community of Zgorzelec was instrumental in the building of The Orthodox Church of Saints Constantine and Helen in 2002. Since 1999, an annual international Greek Song Festival has been held in Zgorzelec.

In 1972, the Polish-East German border was opened for visa-free travel, resulting in intense movement between Zgorzelec and Görlitz, which lasted until 1980, when East Germany unilaterally closed the border due to anti-communist protests and the emergence of the Solidarity movement in Poland. Until 1975 Zgorzelec was administratively located in the Wrocław (Lower Silesian) Voivodeship, and in 1975–1998 it was located in the Jelenia Góra Voivodeship.

=== Recent history ===
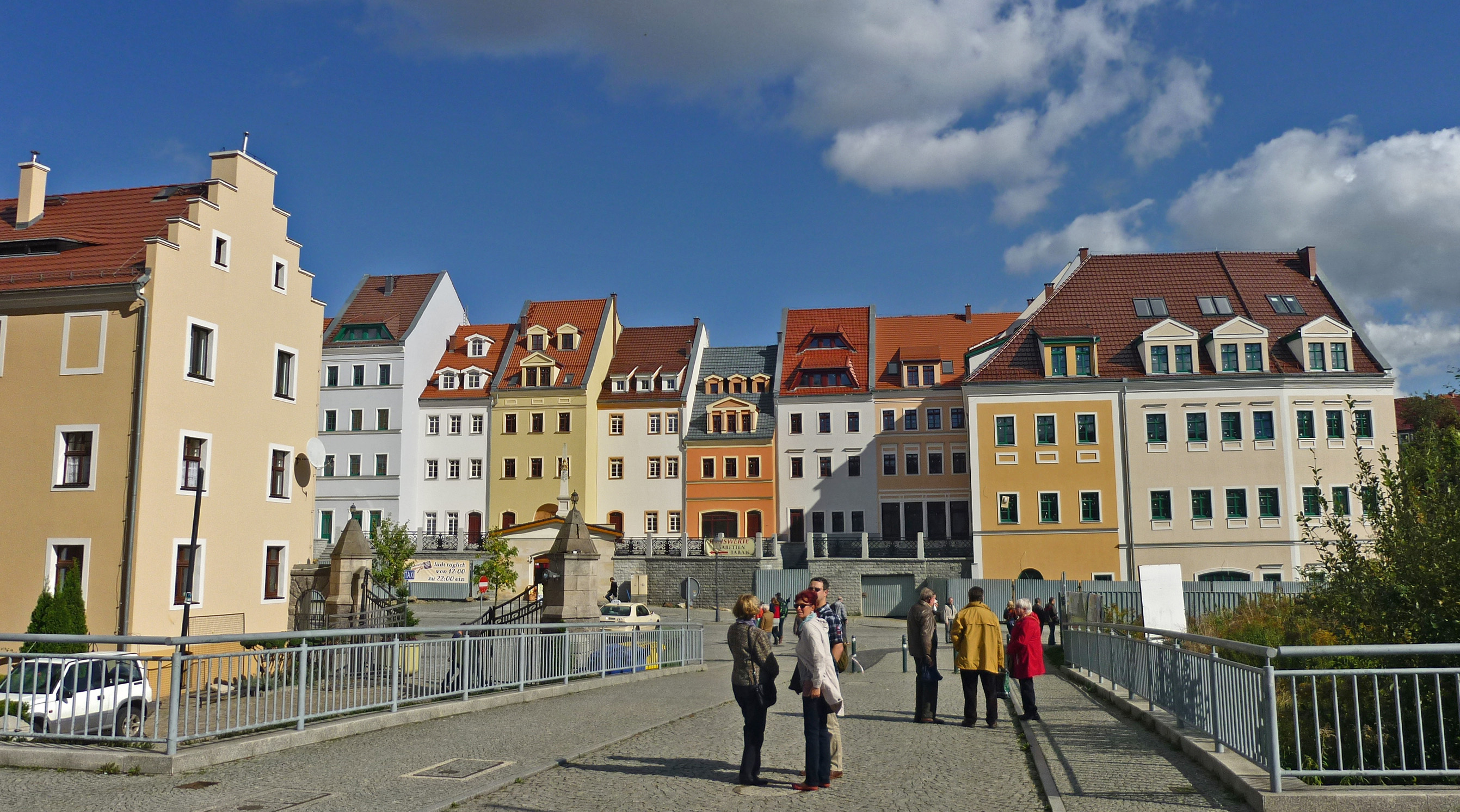
Reconstructed Postal Square, seen from the river

Since the fall of communism in 1989, Zgorzelec and Görlitz have developed a close political relationship. Two of the numerous bridges over the Neisse river that had been blown up by retreating German forces in World War II have been rebuilt, reconnecting the two towns with one bus line. There is also common urban management and annual common sessions of both town councils. In 2006 the towns jointly applied to be the European Capital of Culture in 2010. It was hoped that the jury would be convinced by the concept of Polish-German cooperation, but the award fell to Essen, with Görlitz/Zgorzelec in second place.

== Sights ==
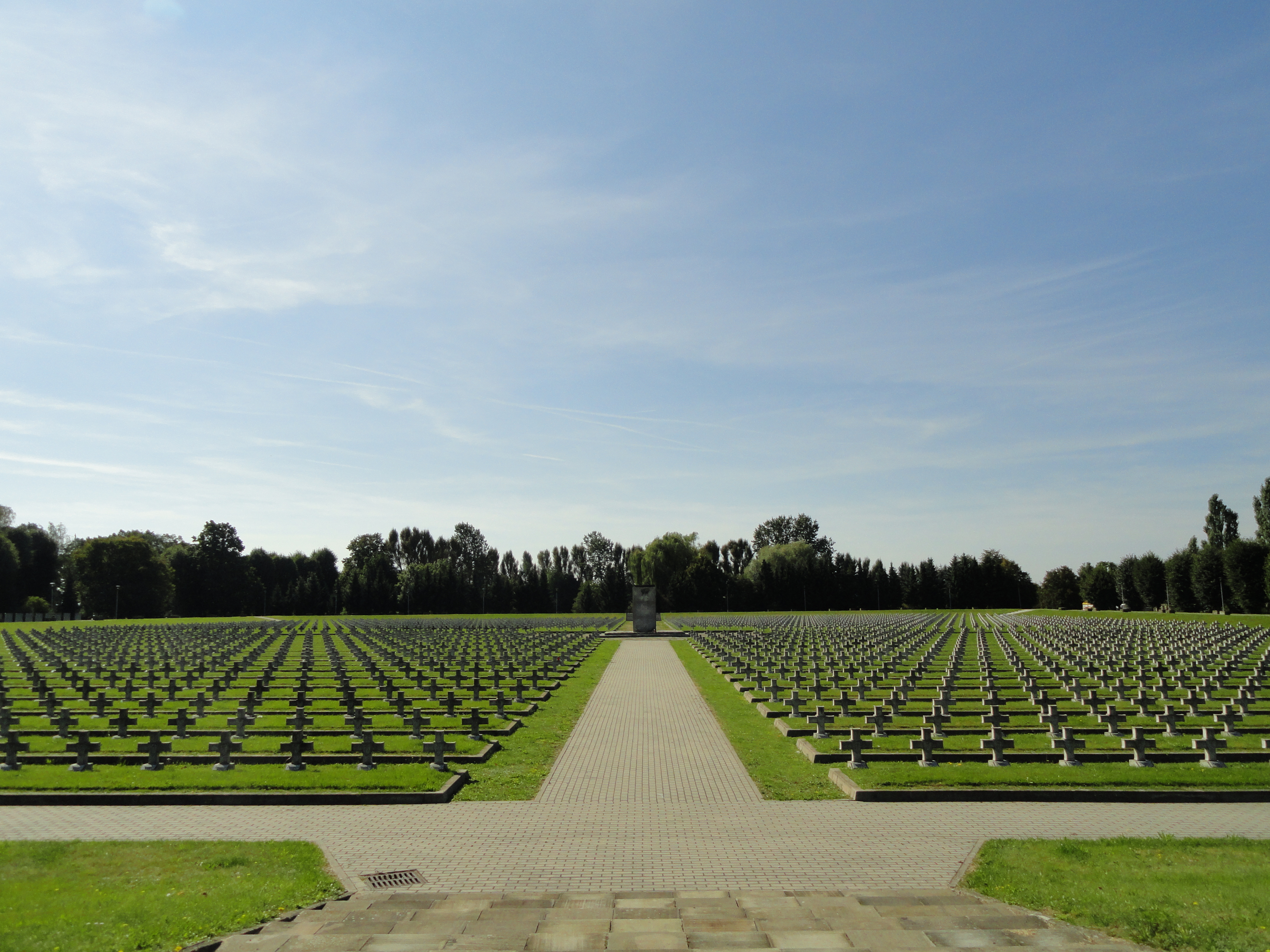
Military cemetery of the Polish Second Army

- Miejski Dom Kultury (Municipal House of Culture)
- Polish-Saxon post milestone of King Augustus II of Poland and the reconstructed Postal Square (Plac Pocztowy)
- Military cemetery of the Polish Second Army – one of the largest military cemeteries in Poland
- Historical parks
- Greek Boulevard (Bulwar Grecki), with a view of Görlitz
- Wheelwright Croft (Zagroda Kołodzieja)
- Muzeum Łużyckie
- Town Hall
- Old townhouses in the city center
- Former Tricycle Mill (Młyn trójkołowy)
- Baroque palace in the Ujazd district
- Memorial to the victims of the Stalag VIII-A German World War II prisoner of war camp

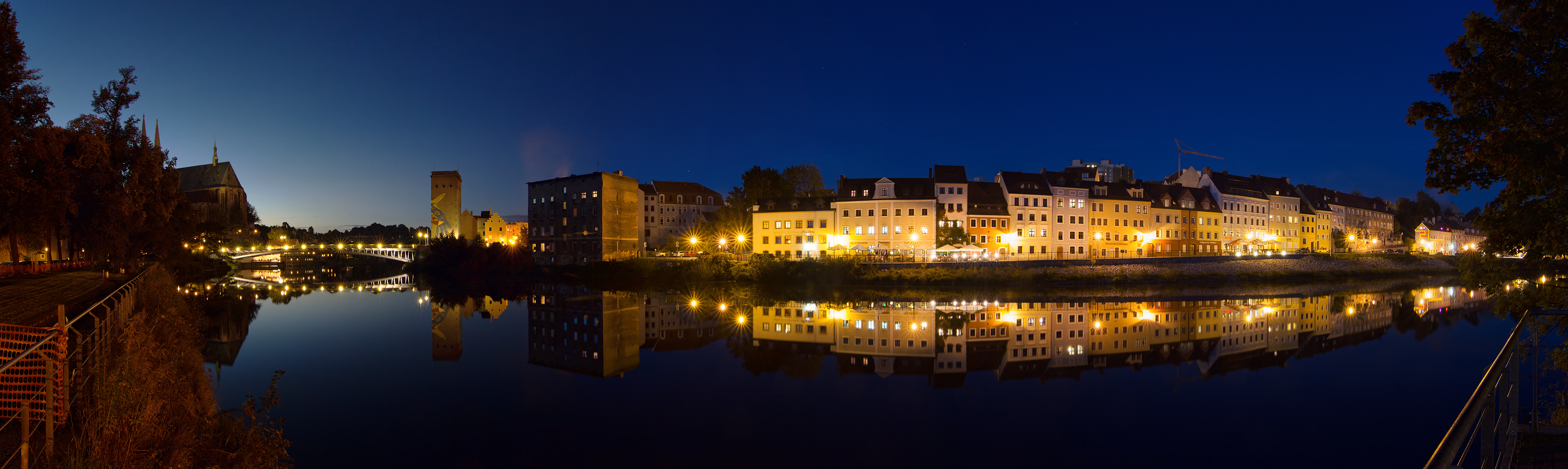
Panorama of Zgorzelec from Görlitz

== Transport ==
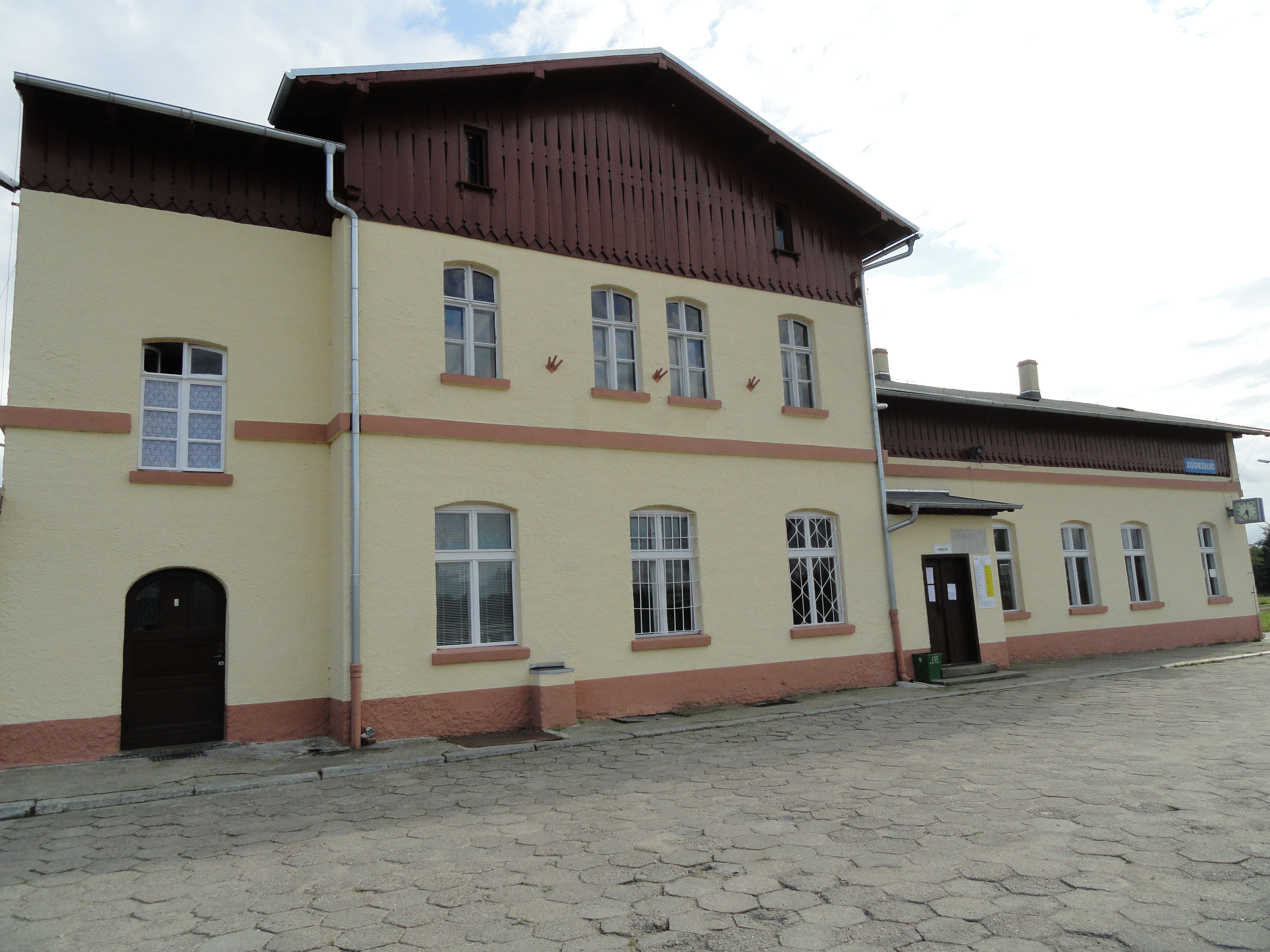
Zgorzelec railway station

Zgorzelec is served by two railway stations, Zgorzelec in the southern part of the town, and Zgorzelec Miasto in the eastern part.

The A4 motorway passes just to the north of Zgorzelec. The town can be accessed from exit 1 of the A4.

== Sports ==
Turów Zgorzelec men's basketball team until 2018 played in the Polish Basketball League (top division). In 2014 Turów won its only national championship and qualified to the Euroleague for the first time. The local football team is Nysa Zgorzelec. It competes in the lower leagues.

== Notable residents ==
- Jakob Böhme (1575–1624), German theologian
- Ryszard Sobczak (born 1967), Polish fencer and Olympic medallist
- Grzegorz Żmija (born 1971), goalkeeper
- Agata Korc (born 1986), Polish swimmer
- Honorata Skarbek (born 1992), Polish singer

== Twin towns – sister cities ==
Zgorzelec is twinned with:

- Avion, France
- Görlitz, Germany (1991)
- Myrhorod, Ukraine
- Naousa, Greece (1998)

== Gallery ==
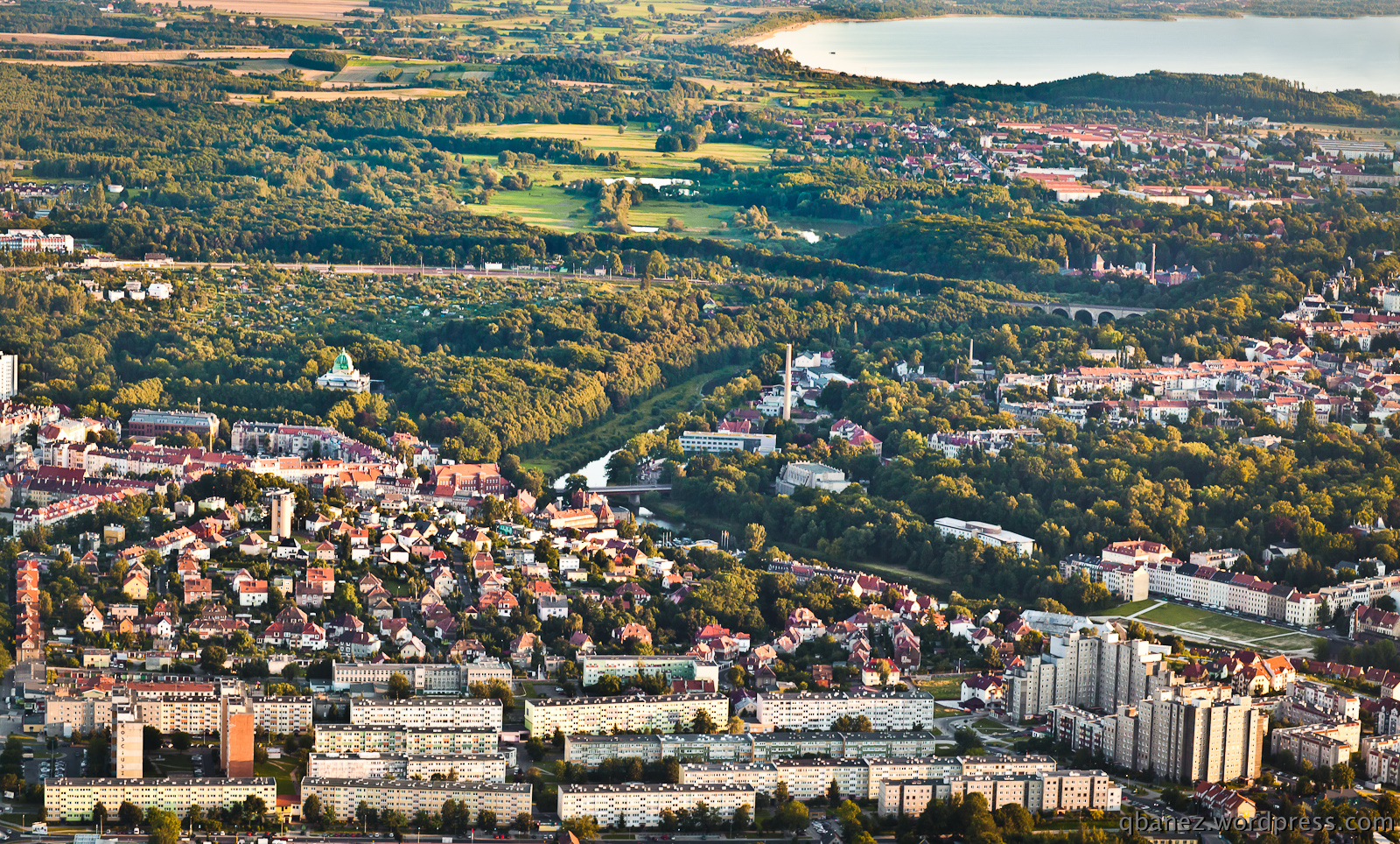
Aerial view of Zgorzelec

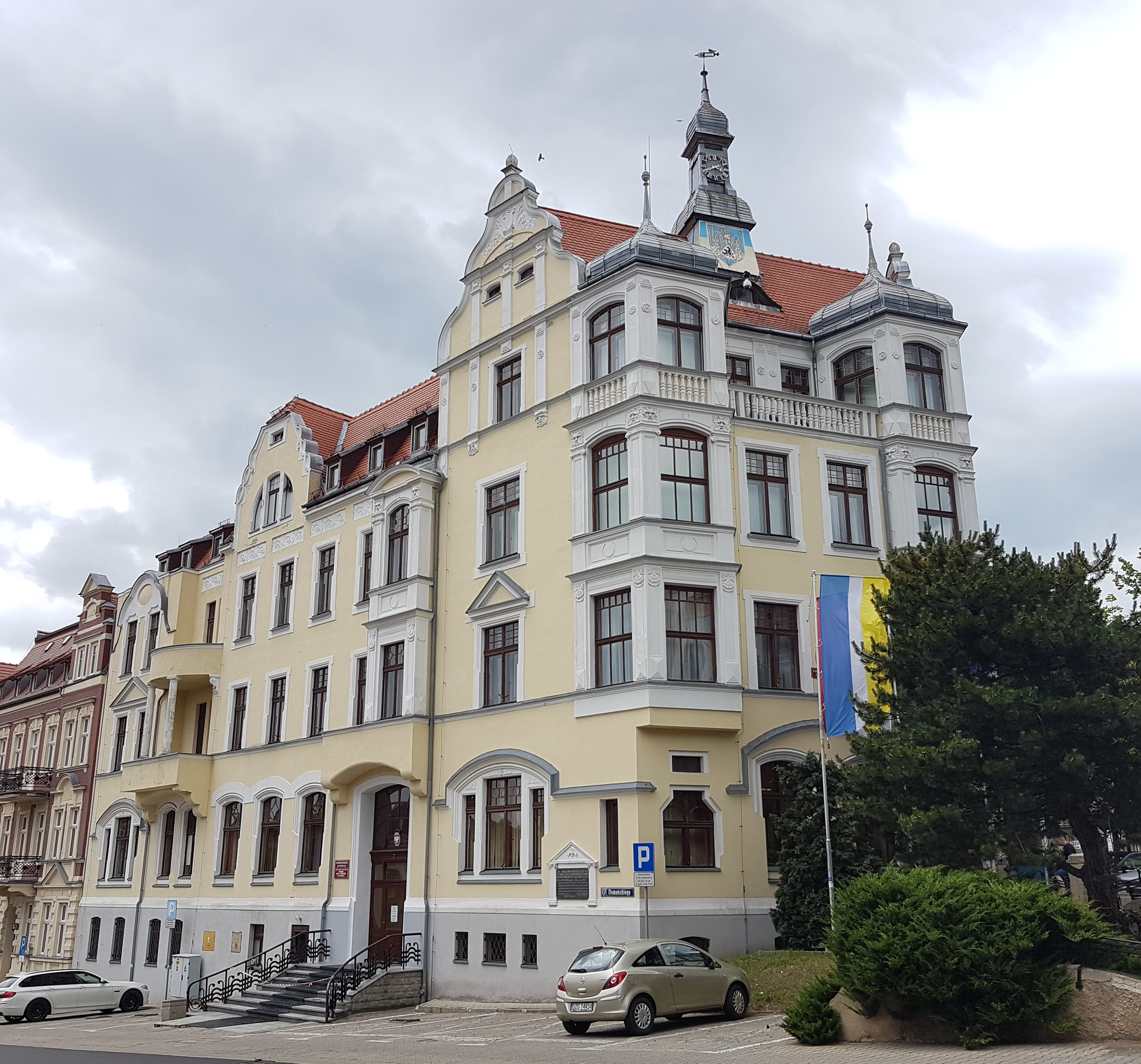
Town Hall

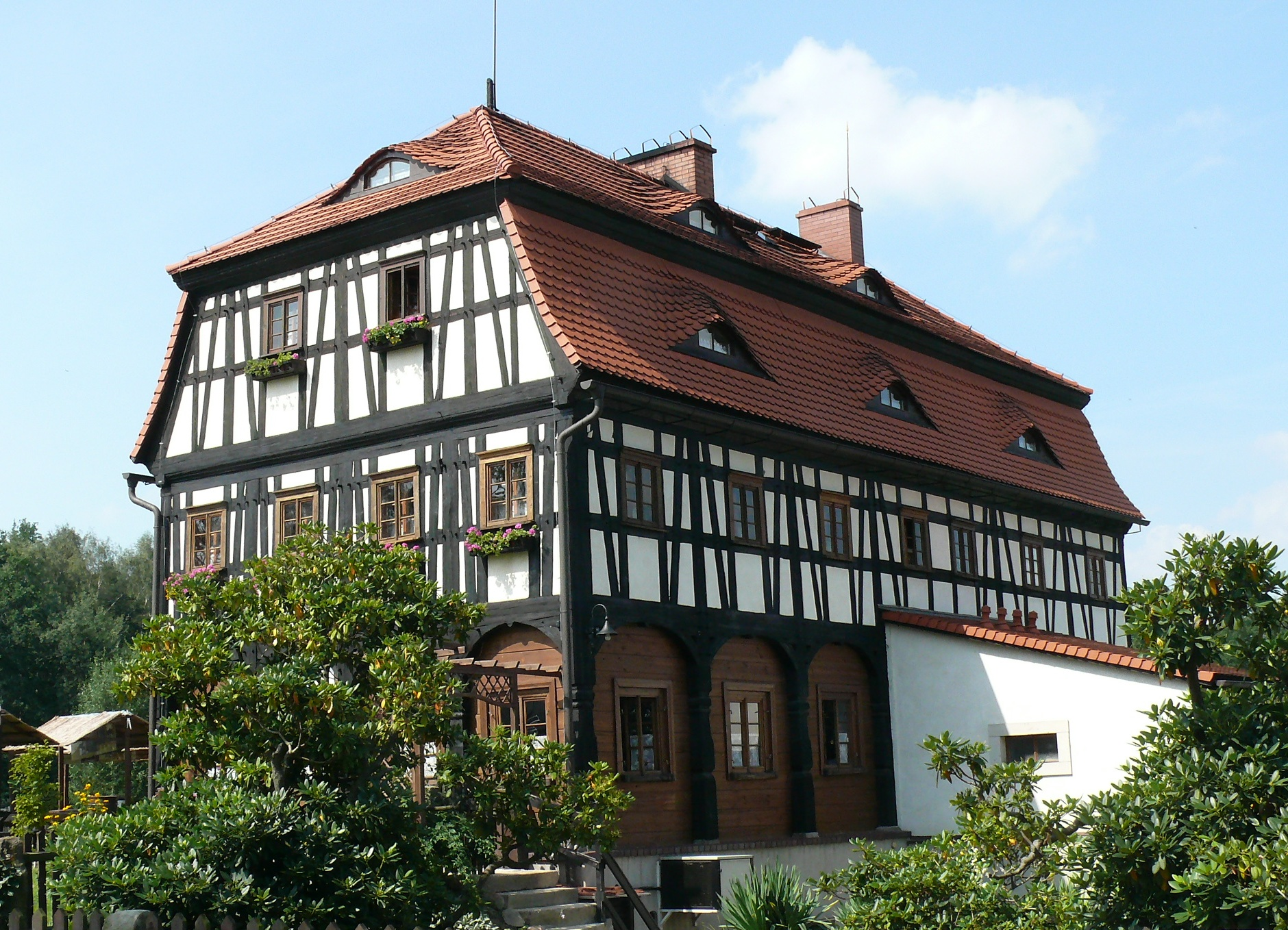
Wheelwright Croft

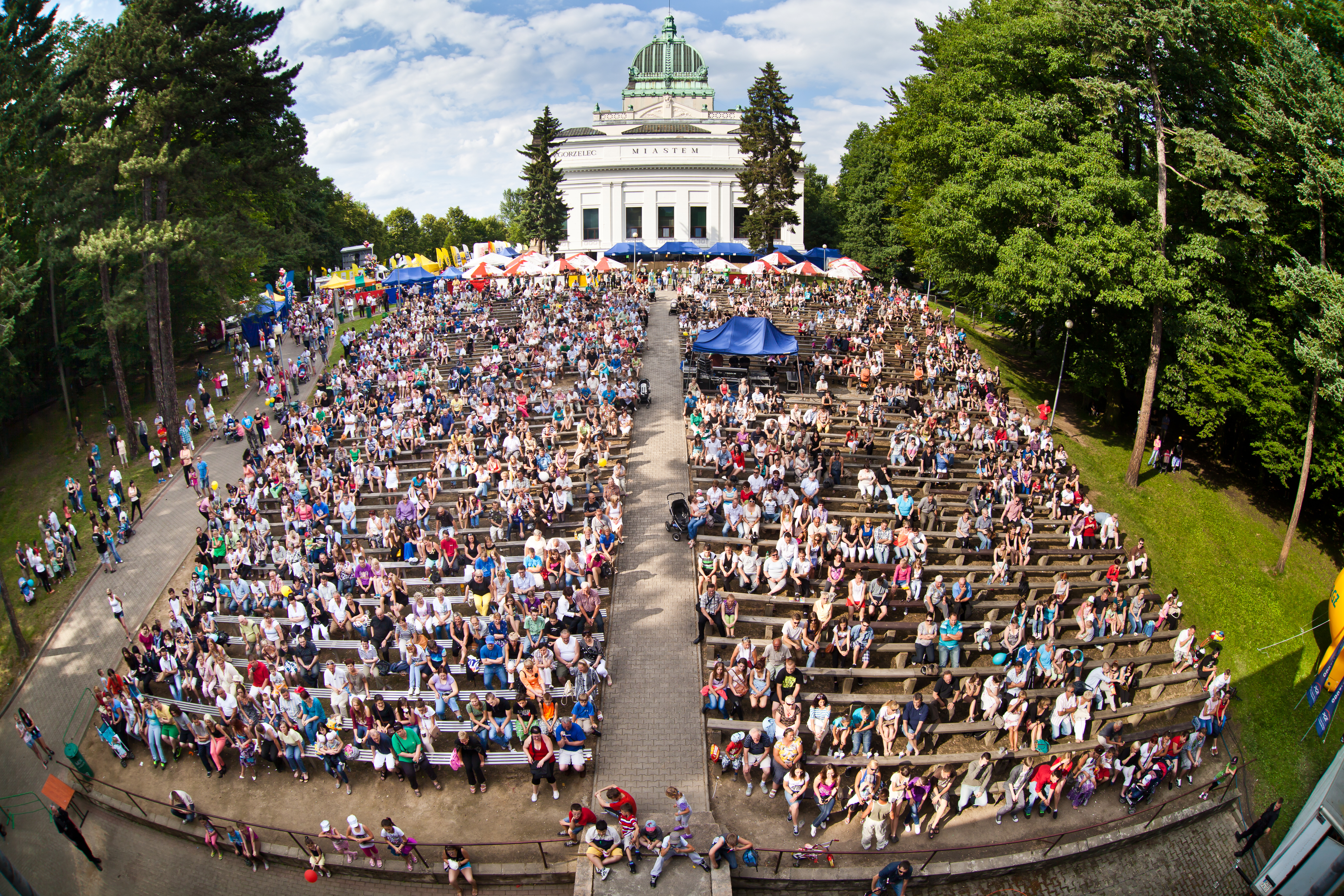
Amphitheatre of Zgorzelec

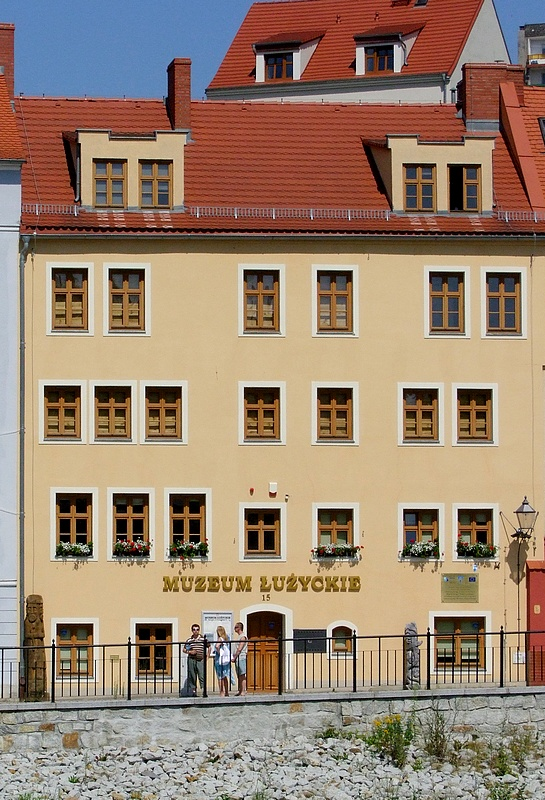
Muzeum Łużyckie

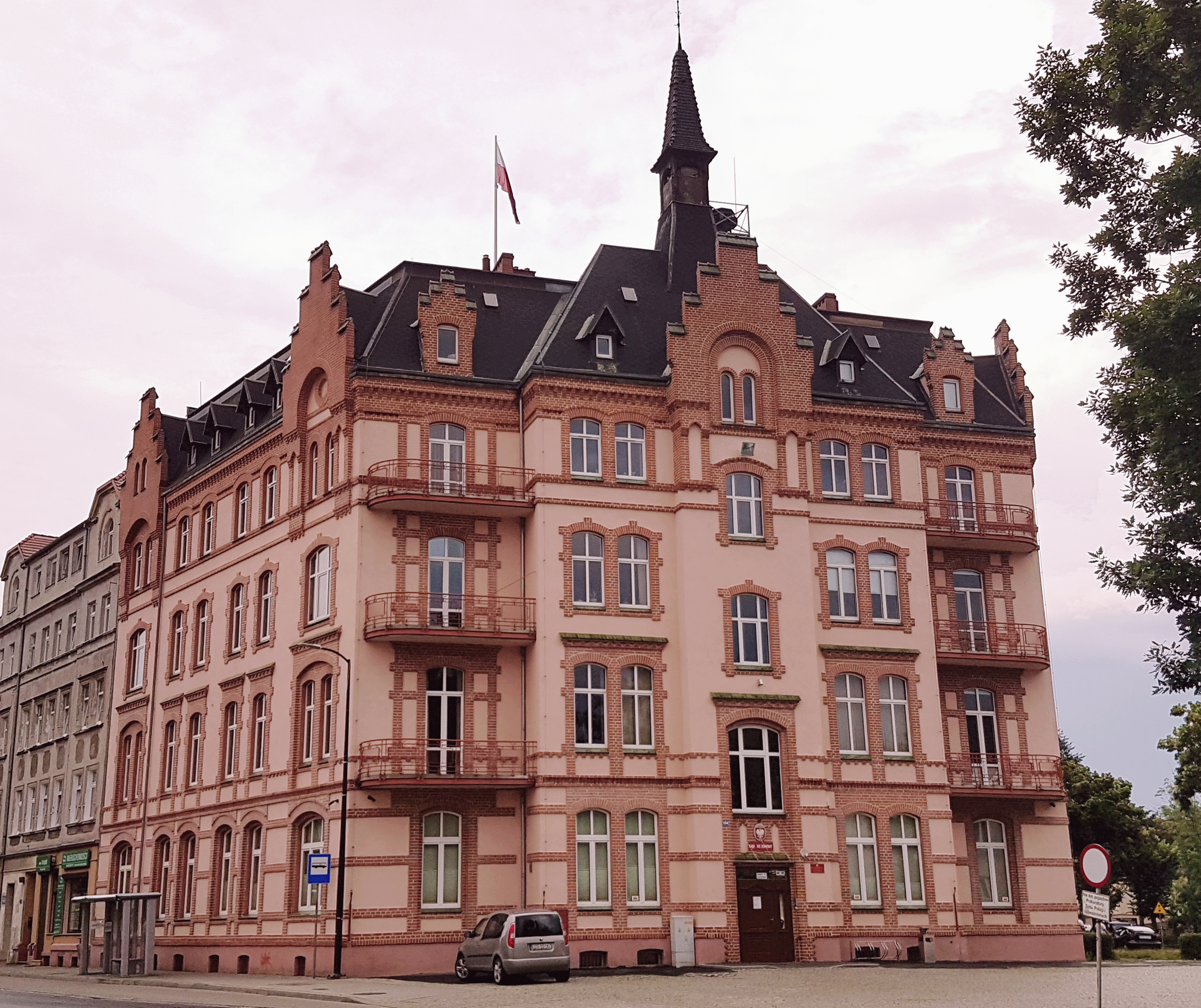
District court

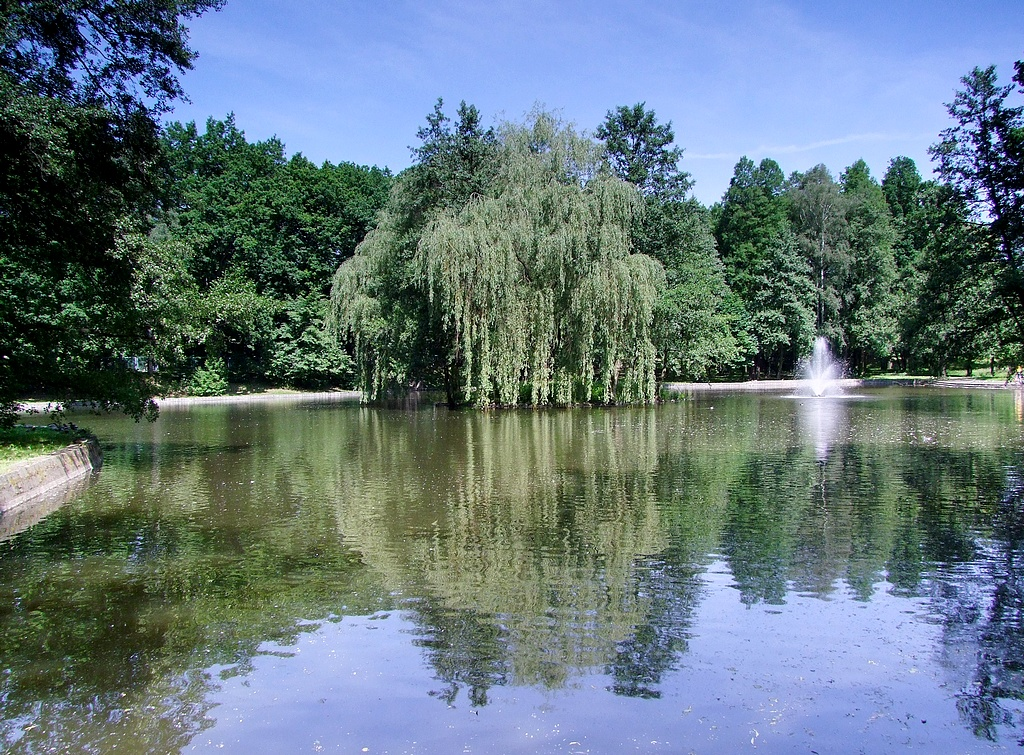
Andrzej Błachaniec Park

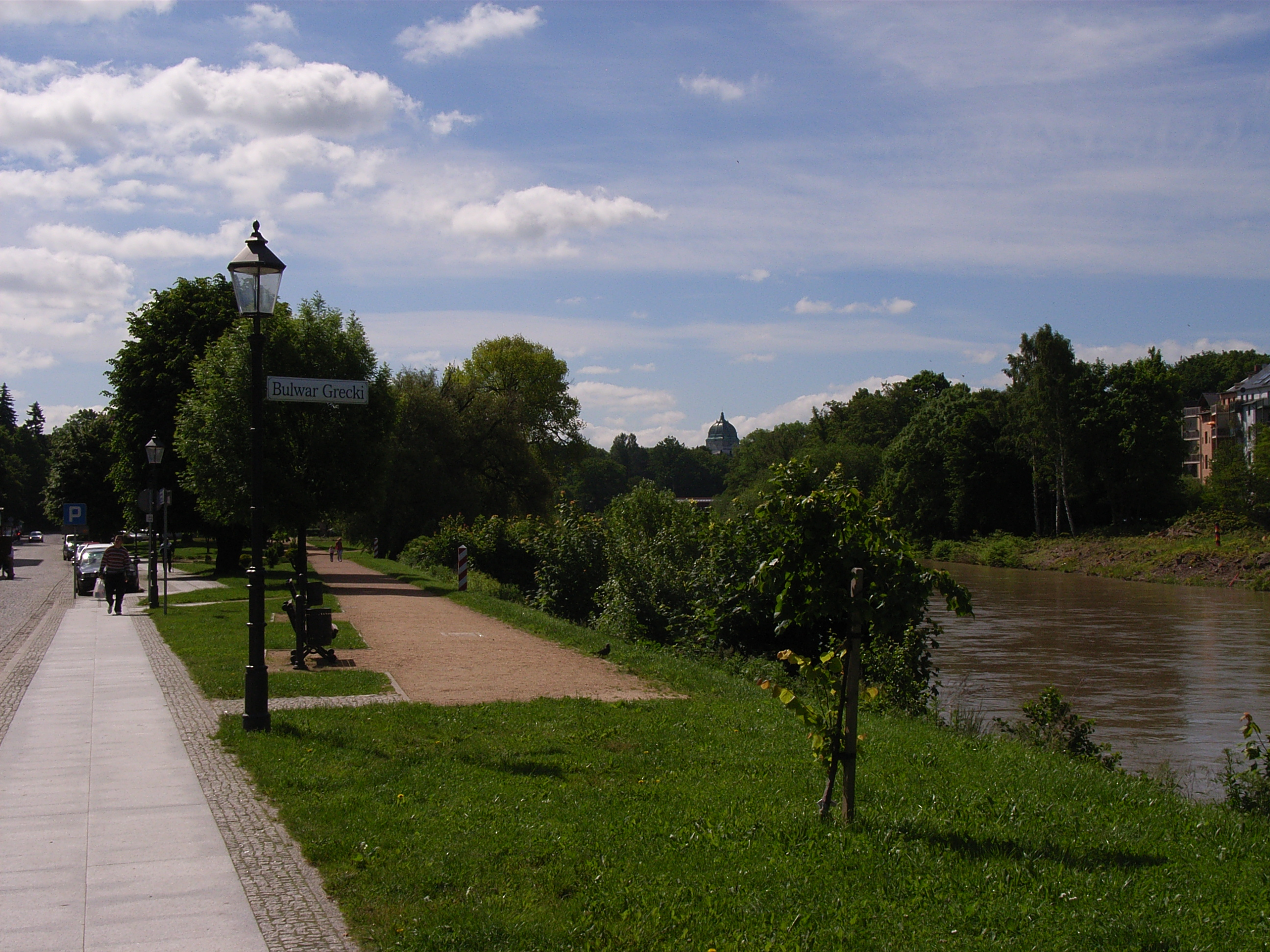
Bulwar Grecki (Greek Boulevard)

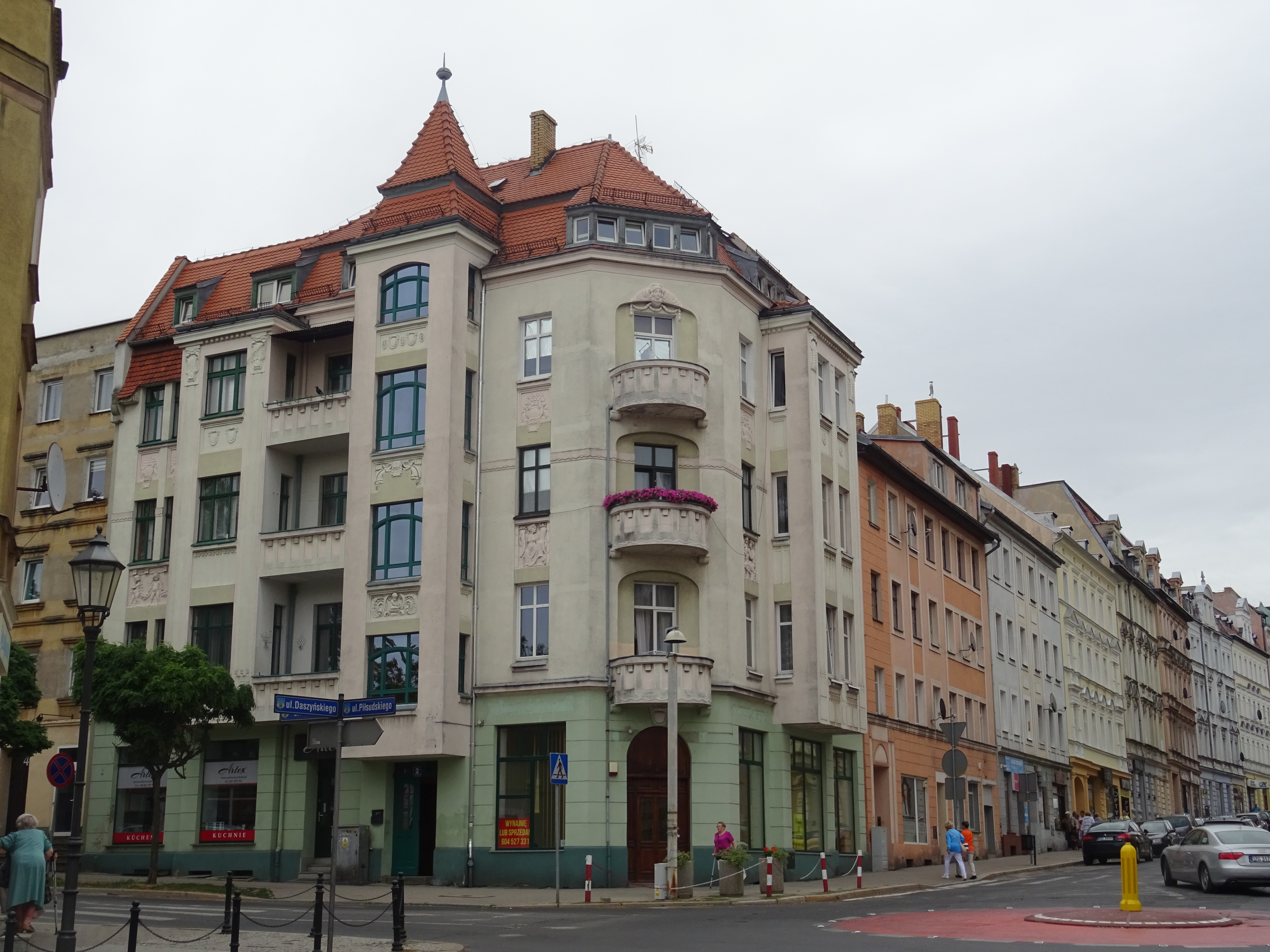
Piłsudskiego Street

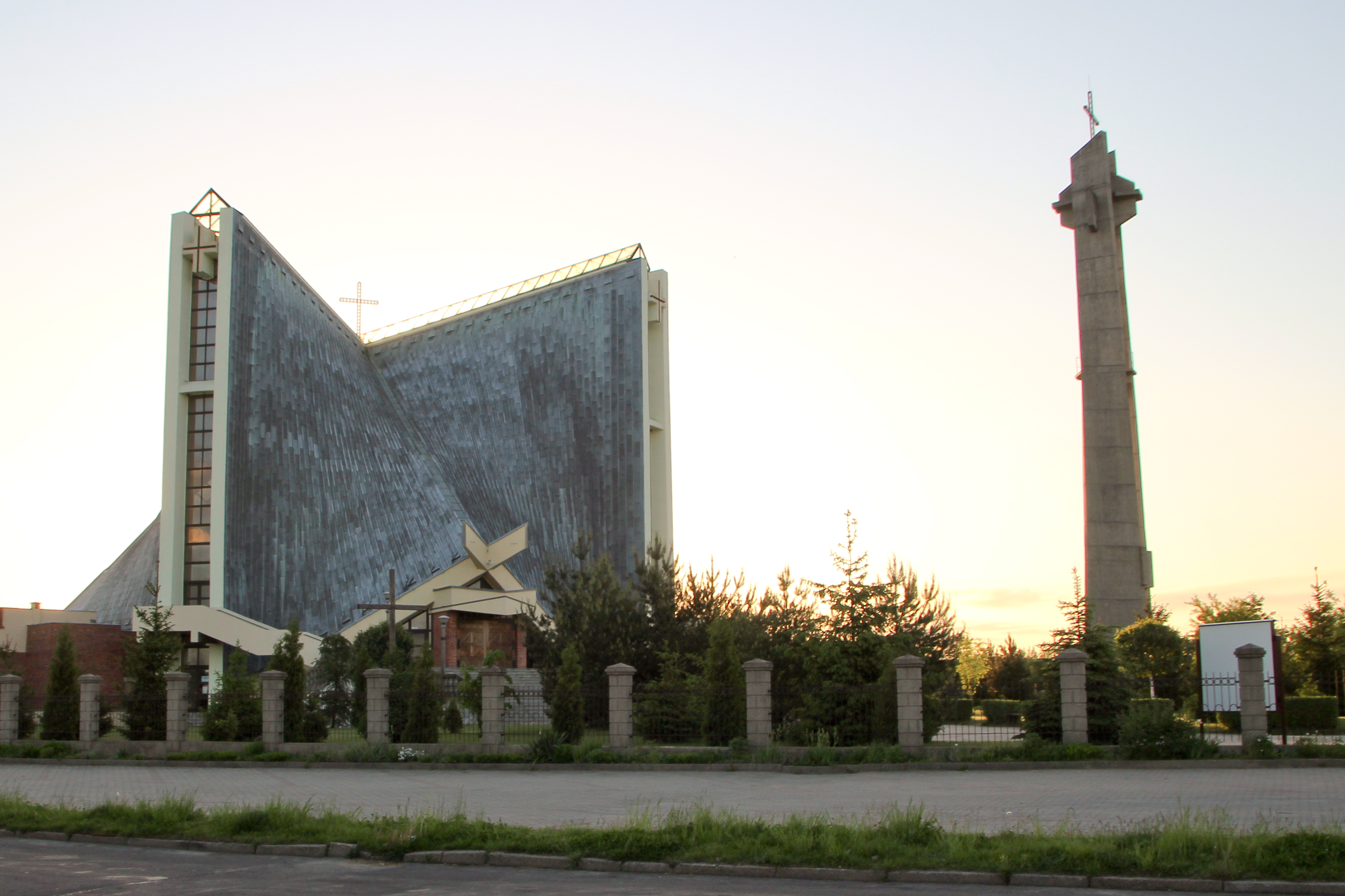
Saint Joseph church

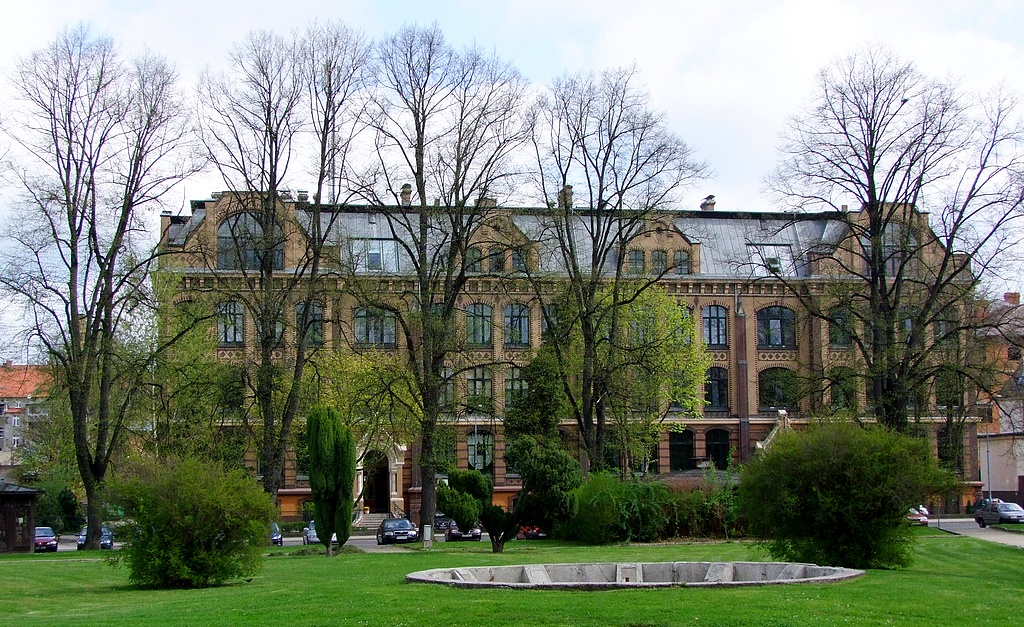
Śniadecki Brothers Liceum (high school)
