= Réka Nagy =

Hungarian swimmer

Personal information
- Full name: Réka Nagy
- Nationality: Hungary
- Born: 9 November 1986 (age 39) Ajka, Veszprém, Hungary

Sport
- Sport: Swimming
- Strokes: Distance Freestyle

Réka Nagy (born 9 November 1986) is an Olympic swimmer from Hungary. She swam for Hungary at the 2008 Olympics in the 800 m freestyle.

She has also swum for Hungary at the World Championships in 2005 and the European Junior Championships in 2002.
