= Treaty of Zgorzelec =

1950 treaty between Poland and East Germany

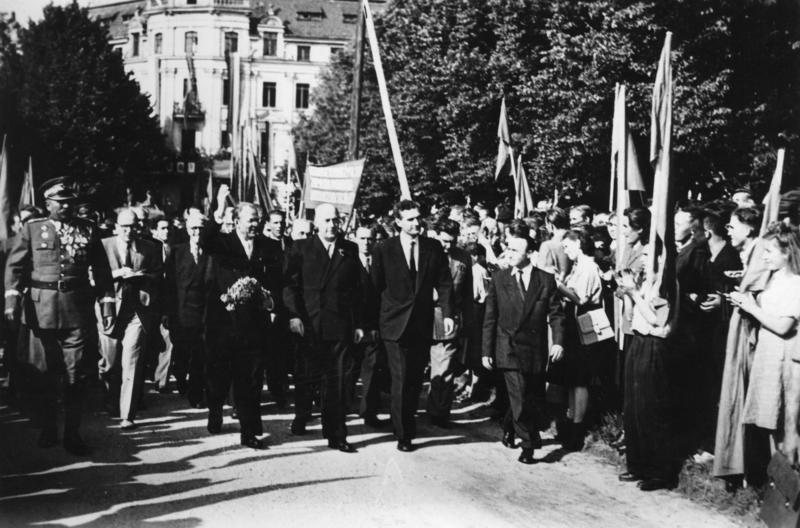
- Otto Grotewohl (l.) and Józef Cyrankiewicz walking to the Zgorzelec community centre to sign the treaty
- Type: Boundary treaty
- Signed: 6 July 1950
- Location: Zgorzelec, Poland
- Original signatories: Józef Cyrankiewicz; Otto Grotewohl
- Parties: Polish People's Republic; German Democratic Republic
- Languages: Polish, German

The Treaty of Zgorzelec, officially the The Agreement Concerning the Demarcation of the Established and the Existing Polish-German State Frontier, also known as the Treaty of Görlitz and Treaty of Zgorzelic between the Republic of Poland and East Germany (GDR) was signed on 6 July 1950 in Zgorzelec, Poland.

== Signing ==
The agreement was signed by Otto Grotewohl, prime minister of the provisional government of the GDR (East Germany) and Polish premier Józef Cyrankiewicz. It recognized the Oder-Neisse line implemented by the 1945 Potsdam Agreement as the border between the two states. The terms referred to the "defined and existing border" from the Baltic Sea west of Świnoujście - however without mentioning Szczecin - along the Oder and Lusatian Neisse rivers to the Czechoslovak border. Thereby the East German government also accepted the division of Kostrzyn nad Odrą/Küstrin-Kietz, Słubice/Frankfurt (Oder), Gubin/Guben and Zgorzelec/Görlitz. This border drawing gave Poland a quarter of the pre-war territory of Germany according to the borders of 1937, whose German-speaking population either fled in the final stages of the war or had been expelled in the wake of the German defeat in accordance with the Potsdam Agreement.

== International reaction and impact ==
The treaty was worded as a declaration and was, initially, not recognised as a legitimate international treaty by West Germany insisting on its exclusive mandate and the members states of NATO. Four years later when the Soviet Union granted East Germany independence, the Soviet Union reserved rights over East Germany (similar to the rights reserved by the Western Allies over West Germany under the Bonn–Paris conventions) pending a final peace treaty with Germany - the 1990 Treaty on the Final Settlement with Respect to Germany. So although the treaty was binding on Poland and East Germany, for several decades it was not seen by many western members of the international community as such. The West German government continued to maintain that the status of the territories east of the Oder–Neisse line were "under Polish and Soviet administration" until in 1970 Chancellor Willy Brandt signed the Treaty of Warsaw, giving de facto acknowledgement of the border and confirming West Germany's acceptance of the Treaty of Zgorzelec as an international agreement binding on the states that were party to it. The validity of the Treaty of Zgorzelec was explicitly confirmed in a judgement of the Federal Constitutional Court of 1973 on the Basic Treaty between East and West Germany. Reunited Germany formally accepted the Oder–Neisse boundary in the German–Polish Border Treaty.

== Location of signing ==
The community centre in which the treaty was signed is one of Zgorzelec's main sights and is found in a park beside the road bridge border crossing. Built in typical Wilhelmine style, it was originally opened as the Upper Lusatian Memorial Hall (Oberlausitzer Gedenkhalle), and has been known as the Municipal House of Culture in Zgorzelec (Miejski Dom Kultury w Zgorzelcu) since 1975.

== Commemoration ==
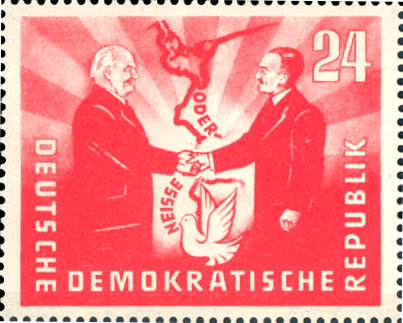
1951 East German stamp commemorative of the Treaty of Zgorzelec featuring the presidents Wilhelm Pieck (GDR) and Bolesław Bierut (Poland)
