= Aleksey Zatsepin =

Russian swimmer

Alexei Zatsepine
Personal information
- Full name: Aleksey Vladimirovich Zatsepin
- National team: Russia
- Born: 5 May 1984 (age 42) Naberezhnye Chelny, Russian SFSR, Soviet Union
- Height: 1.85 m (6 ft 1 in)
- Weight: 76 kg (168 lb)

Sport
- Sport: Swimming
- Strokes: Freestyle, medley
- Club: SDYuShOR Olimpiyskiy
Medal record
Men's swimming
Representing Russia
European Junior Championships
Gold medal – first place	2002 Linz	4×200 m freestyle
Silver medal – second place	2002 Linz	200 m medley
Silver medal – second place	2002 Linz	4×100 m medley

Aleksey Vladimirovich Zatsepin (also Alexei Zatsepine, Russian: Алексей Владимирович Зацепин; born 5 May 1984) is a Russian former swimmer, who specialized in freestyle and individual medley events. He is a five-time Russian champion in freestyle relays and individual medley (2000–2005). He also won a gold medal, as a member of the Russian team, in the 4×200 m freestyle relay (7:28.25) at the 2002 European Junior Swimming Championships in Linz, Austria.

Zatsepin qualified for two swimming events at the 2004 Summer Olympics in Athens, by clearing a FINA A-standard entry time of 2:02.15 (200 m individual medley) from the Russian Championships in Moscow. He also teamed up with Maksim Kuznetsov, Yevgeniy Natsvin, and Stepan Ganzey in the 4×200 m freestyle relay. Swimming the second leg, Zatsepin recorded a split of 1:51.75, and the Russian team finished the heats in eleventh overall with a final time of 7:23.97.

In his only individual event, 200 m individual medley, Zatsepine challenged seven other swimmers on the final heat of seven, including top medal favorite Michael Phelps of the United States. He rounded out the field to last place by nearly two seconds behind Australia's Adam Lucas in 2:04.11. Zatsepine failed to advance into the semifinals, as he placed twenty-ninth overall in the preliminaries.

Zatsepin retired from his sporting career in 2005 to serve as an assistant coach for the swimming team at Kama State Institute of Physical Culture in his home town Naberezhnye Chelny.
