= Grzegorz Żmija =

Polish footballer

Personal information
- Date of birth: 27 November 1971 (age 54)
- Place of birth: Zgorzelec, Poland
- Height: 1.86 m (6 ft 1 in)
- Position: Goalkeeper

Senior career*
Years	Team	Apps	(Gls)
1994–1995	Ostrovia Ostrów		
1995–2000	Polonia Bytom		
1996	→ Ostrovia Ostrów (loan)		
2000–2001	Włókniarz Kietrz		
2002	LKS Gomunice		
2002–2008	Polonia Bytom		
2006–2010	→ Śląsk Świętochłowice (loan)		
2008–2009	Ruch Radzionków		
2024	Gwarek Tarnowskie Góry	0	(0)

Managerial career
- 2009–2012: Ruch Radzionków (goalkeeping coach)
- 2012–2013: Pogoń Szczecin (goalkeeping coach)
- 2013–2014: Skra Częstochowa (goalkeeping coach)
- 2015: Podbeskidzie (goalkeeping coach)
- 2015–2017: Kotwica Kołobrzeg (goalkeeping coach)
- 2017: Wigry Suwałki (goalkeeping coach)
- 2018: MKS Kluczbork (goalkeeping coach)
- 2018: Kotwica Kołobrzeg (goalkeeping coach)
- 2019: Spójnia Landek (goalkeeping coach)
- 2019: Stal Mielec (goalkeeping coach)
- 2019–2021: Wisła Kraków (goalkeeping coach)
- 2021: MKS Kluczbork (assistant)
- 2021–2022: Kotwica Kołobrzeg (goalkeeping coach)
- 2023–2024: Gwarek Tarnowskie Góry (goalkeeping coach)
- 2025: Pogoń-Sokół Lubaczów (goalkeeping coach)
- 2025–2026: GKS Jastrzębie (goalkeeping coach)
- * Club domestic league appearances and goals

Grzegorz Żmija (born 27 November 1971) is a Polish former professional footballer who played as a goalkeeper. He most recently served as a goalkeeping coach at GKS Jastrzębie.

Żmija made his debut in Ekstraklasa at the age of 36. In 2024, 15 years after his initial retirement, he was registered by Gwarek to play in the III liga.
