= Pierre Henri =

French swimmer (born 1983)

Personal information
- National team: France
- Born: 25 February 1983 (age 43) Quimper, Finistère, France
- Height: 1.83 m (6 ft 0 in)
- Weight: 74 kg (163 lb)

Sport
- Sport: Swimming
- Strokes: Individual medley
- Club: Canet 66
- Coach: Philippe Lucas
Medal record
Men's swimming
Representing France
European Junior Championships
Silver medal – second place	2001 Valletta	400 m medley

Pierre Henri (born 25 February 1983) is a French swimmer, who specialized in individual medley events. He represented his nation France at the 2008 Summer Olympics, and also claimed a silver medal in the 400 m individual medley at the 2001 European Junior Championships in Valletta, Malta (4:21.39). Henri is a member of Club Natation Canet 66 in Canet-en-Roussillon, and is coached and trained by Philippe Lucas.

Henri competed as a lone French swimmer in the men's 400 m individual medley at the 2008 Summer Olympics in Beijing. He topped the field with a time of 4:18.23 for an outright spot on the Olympic swimming team at the French Championships in Dunkirk, bettering the FINA A-standard (4:18.40) by just 0.17 of a second. Swimming in heat five, Henri came from the bottom of the field to power past the Greek swimmer Romanos Alyfantis by exactly a single second for the seventh spot in 4:22.41. Henri failed to advance to the top eight final, as he placed twenty-second overall in the prelims.
