= Diána Reményi =

Hungarian swimmer (born 1986)

Personal information
- Full name: Diána Reményi
- National team: Hungary
- Born: 4 April 1986 (age 40) Budapest, Hungary
- Height: 1.68 m (5 ft 6 in)
- Weight: 60 kg (132 lb)

Sport
- Sport: Swimming
- Strokes: Breaststroke, medley
- Club: Budapesti Spartacus SC
- Coach: György Turi
Medal record
Women's swimming
Representing Hungary
European Junior Championships
Gold medal – first place	2002 Linz	200 m medley
Gold medal – first place	2002 Linz	200 m medley
Silver medal – second place	2002 Linz	200 m breaststroke
Bronze medal – third place	2002 Linz	4×100 m medley

Diána Reményi (born 4 April 1986 in Budapest) is a Hungarian former swimmer, who specialized in breaststroke and individual medley events. She is a two-time junior European champion, and a finalist at the European Short Course Swimming Championships. She is also a member of Budapesti Spartacus SC, and is coached and trained by György Turi.

Reményi made her international debut at the 2002 European Junior Swimming Championships in Linz, Austria. She won a total of four medals, including two golds each in the 200 m individual medley (2:16.35) and 400 m individual medley (4:46.20). She also helped out the Hungarians (Nikolett Szepesi, Katalin Taray, and Renata Papp) to take a bronze medal in the women's 4 × 100 m medley relay (4:16.44).

Reményi qualified for the women's 200 m breaststroke, along with defending Olympic champion Ágnes Kovács, at the 2004 Summer Olympics in Athens. She posted a FINA A-standard entry time of 2:28.12 from the World Championships in Barcelona, Spain. She was about to participate in heat three of the preliminary heats, but scratched out of the race for health and personal reasons.
