= Regina Sych =

Russian freestyle swimmer (born 1987)

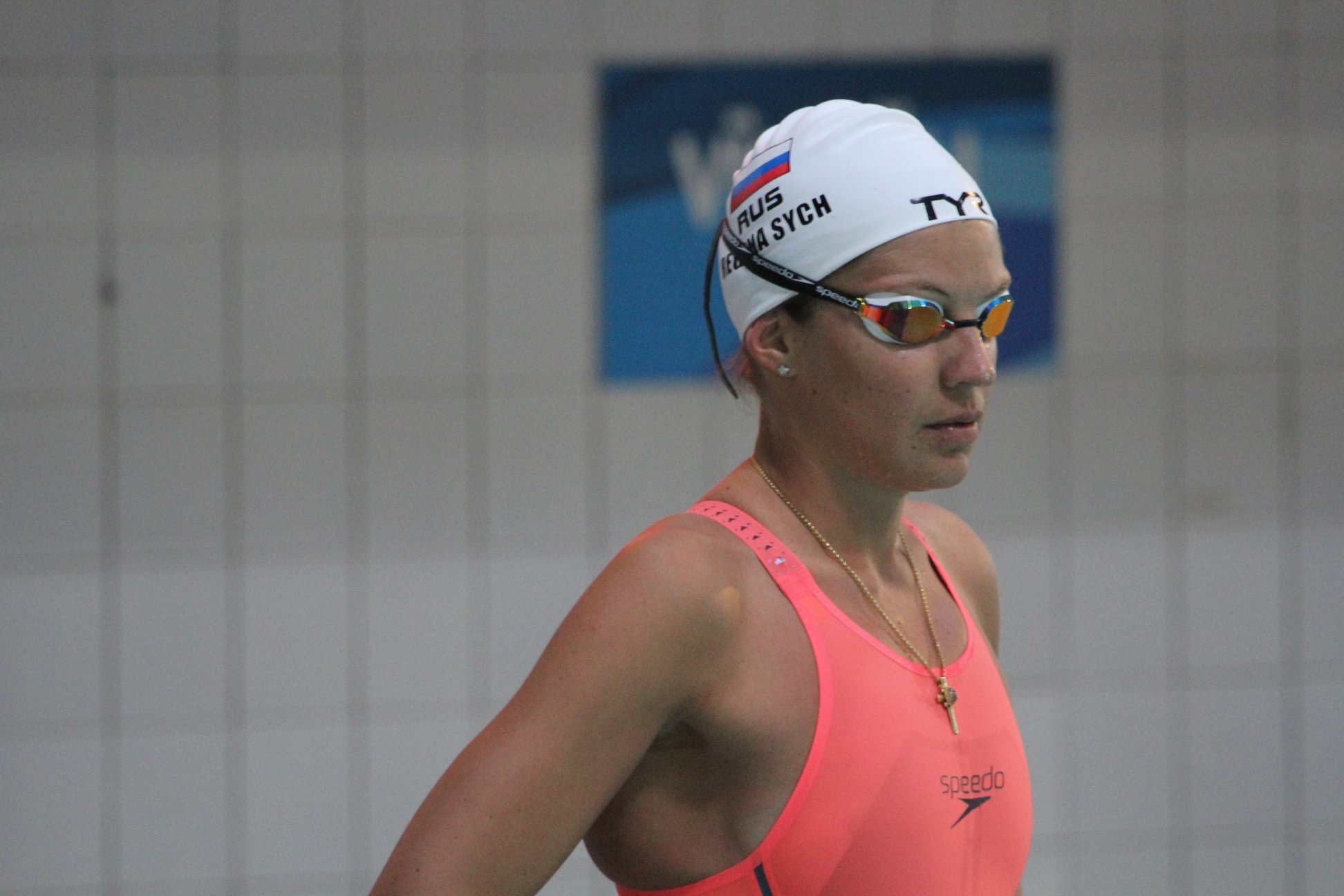

Personal information
- Full name: Regina Konstantinovna Sych
- National team: Russia
- Born: 21 July 1987 (age 38) Petropavlovsk-Kamchatsky
- Height: 1.80 m (5 ft 11 in)

Sport
- Sport: Swimming
- Strokes: Freestyle
- Club: Volga, Pregel
- Coach: Arseneva Elena, Revyakin Vladimir, Avdienko Victor

Regina Sych (Russian: Регина Константиновна Сыч; born 21 July 1987) is a Russian swimmer, who specialised in freestyle events. She is a finalist of 2003 World Aquatics Championships, bronze medalist of the European Short Water Championship in 2003, multiple winner of the European youth championships and Russian championships. Regina Sych had some Russian youth records in 800 freestyle (08.32,86) and in 1500 freestyle (16.13,13), which were set in Barcelona, Spain in 2003.

== Biography ==
Born 21 July 1987 in Petropavlovsk-Kamchatsky, Russia, in a family of athletes. Her father is a master of sports in boxing and mother is a master of sports in swimming. Regina Sych started swimming in fifth grade. Her first coach was Elena Arsenyeva. She discerned a talented athlete in the girl. Under the leadership of coach Vladimir Revyakin, Regina Sych joined the Russian national team in 2002. At first, she performed as a member of the youth team, then of the main. In Volgograd, her coach was the honored trainer of the USSR and Russia Victor Avdienko.

== Education ==
Far Eastern Federal University

== Swimming career ==
=== Professional career ===
In May 2000, she won the Championship of the Far East in four swimming disciplines at once and became a master of sports.

Russian Junior championship, Volgograd 16–19.06.2001:

100 freestyle 01.00,90 (6th place)

200 freestyle 02.11,41 (9th place)

400 freestyle 04.39,41 (9th place)

Russian National championship, Moscow 27–30.06.2001:

100 freestyle 01.01,82 (30th place)

200 freestyle 02.13,18 (21st place)

Russian Junior championship, Volgograd 30.07-03.08.2001:

50 freestyle 00.28,41 (8th place)

100 freestyle 01.02,37 (20th place)

800 freestyle 09.36,74 (16th place)

Russian Junior championship among the teams SDYUSHOR and DYUSSH, Saint Petersburg 07–09.12.2001:

100 freestyle 00.58,35 (1st place)

200 freestyle 02.06.76 (3rd place)

400 freestyle 04.25,19 (3rd place)

Russian National championship, Moscow 11–15.03.2002:

50 freestyle 00.26,62 (10th place)

100 freestyle 00.57,82 (10th place)

200 freestyle 02.04,36 (11th place)

Relay 4*200 freestyle (6th place) Kamchatka region team

Russian Junior championship, Rostov-on-Don 04–07.06.2002:

50 м freestyle 00.26,68 (1st place)

100 м freestyle 00.57,48 (1st place)

200 м freestyle 02.02,39 (1st place)

International Youth Sports Games of the CIS countries, the Baltic States and Russian regions, Moscow 19–23.06.2002:

50 freestyle 00.26,80 (1st place)

100 freestyle 00.57,55 (1st place)

200 freestyle 02.02,98 (1st place)

400 freestyle 04.17,40 (1st place)

European Junior Championship, Linz (Austria) 11–14.07.2002:

100 freestyle 00.56,92 (2nd place)

200 freestyle 02.03,55 (2nd place)

400 freestyle 04.15,43 (1st place)

Relay 4*100 freestyle (2nd place)

Relay 4*100 IM (1st place) CR

Relay 4*200 freestyle (1st place)

European Short Course Championships, Riesa (Germany) 12–15.12.2002:

200 freestyle 02.00,81 (13th place)

400 freestyle 04.10,76 (7th place)

Russian Short Course Championship, Lipetsk February 2003:

800 freestyle (1st place)

Russian National Championship, Moscow 21–25.04.2003:

200 freestyle 02.02,25 (2nd place)

400 freestyle 04.13,00 (1st place)

800 freestyle 08.37,77 (1st place)

1500 freestyle 16.36,82 (1st place)

Relay 4*100 freestyle (1st place) Volgograd region team

Regina Sych joined the Russian national team to participate in the World Championship in Barcelona, Spain.

World Aquatics Championship, Barcelona (Spain) 13–27.07.2003:

400 freestyle 04.13.79 (15th place)

800 freestyle 08.39,96 (7th place, final); 08.32,86 (3rd place, heats)

1500 freestyle 16,13,13 (4th place, final); 16.23,33 (8th place, heats) NR

Relay 4*200 freestyle (10th place)

European Junior Championship, Glazgo (Scotland) August 2003:

200 freestyle (2nd place)

400 freestyle 04.12,28 (1st place)

800 freestyle 08.38,67 (1st place)

Relay 4*200 freestyle (1st place)

European Short Course Championships, Dublin (Ireland) 11–14.12.2003:

200 freestyle 02.00,37 (29th place)

400 freestyle 04.05,00 (3rd place)

800 freestyle 08.28,36 (5th place)

FINA World Cup, Moscow 21.01.2004:

400 freestyle 04.14,70 (7th place)

800 freestyle 08.37,15 (2nd place)

Winter Russian National Championship, Chekhov (Moscow region) 08–11.02.2004 год:

200 м в/с 02.06,66 (8 место)

FINA World Cup Short Course, Moscow 26–27.01.2005:

50 freestyle 00.27,43 (24th place)

100 freestyle 00.59,44 (31st place)

200 freestyle 02.03,36 (15th place)

Ukrainian National Championship, Kharkiv (Ukraine) 14–17.03.2005:

50 butterfly 00.31,59

200 freestyle 02.06,22

400 freestyle 04.26,02 (final), 04.19,68 (semi-final)

800 freestyle 08.58,89

Far East Short Course Championship (stage of Russian National Championship), Khabarovsk 07–10.02.2006:

50 freestyle 00.26,61 (1st place)

50 butterfly 00.30,27 (7th place)

100 freestyle 00.57,67 (1st place)

200 freestyle 02.02,58 (1st place)

400 freestyle 04.16,86 (1st place)

800 freestyle 08.51,42 (1st place)

Relay 4*100 freestyle (1st place) Kamchatka region team

Relay 4*200 freestyle (1st place) Kamchatka region team

Far East Championship (stage of Russian National Championship), Vladivostok 16–19.05.2006:

50 freestyle 00.27,77 (1st place)

50 backstroke 00.34,32 (9th place)

50 butterfly 00.31,00 (7th place)

100 freestyle 01.00,06 (1st place)

200 freestyle 02.10,21 (1st place)

400 freestyle 04.30,32 (1st place)

Relay 4*100 freestyle (1st place) Kamchatka region tram

Relay 4*100 IM (1st place) Kamchatka region team

Relay 4*200 freestyle (1st place) Kamchatka region team

Russian National Championship 2006:

400 freestyle 04.20,68

Russian National Cup Short Course, Lipetsk 11–14.11.2006:

200 freestyle 02.04,54 (11th place)

400 freestyle 04.17,54 (5th place)

800 freestyle 08.47,49 (5th place)

Championship of the city, Petropavlovsk-Kamchatsky 04–05.05.2007:

100 butterfly 01.08,54 (1st place)

200 butterfly 02.30,61 (1st place)

Championship of the region, Kamchatka region 05.07.2007:

50 freestyle 00.27,58 (1st place)

50 butterfly 00.30,39 (1st place)

100 freestyle 00.58,62 (1st place)

200 freestyle 02.06,58 (1st place)

400 freestyle 04.26,60 (2nd place)

800 freestyle 09.05,80 (1st place)

Far East Championship (selection for the Russian National Championship), Khabarovsk 16–19.01.2007:

50 butterfly 00.29,94 (2nd place)

50 backstroke 00.32,43 (4th place)

100 freesyyle 00.57,81 (1st place)

200 freestyle 02.02,86 (1st place)

200 backstroke 02.23,53 (2nd place)

800 freestyle 08.43,24 (1st place)

Relay 4*100 freestyle (1st place) Kamchatka region team

Relay 4*200 freestyle (1st place) Kamchatka region team

Far East Championship, May 2007:

50 freestyle 00.27,75 (heats) DSQ

50 backstroke 00.37,28 (8th place); 00.33,97 (heats)

100 freestyle 00.59,05 (1st place)

200 freestyle 02.07,54 (2nd place)

200 backstroke 02.32,85 (3rd place)

400 freestyle 04.30,12 (2nd place)

800 freestyle 09.07,51 (2nd place)

1500 freestyle 17.52,72 (1st place)

Relay 4*100 freestyle (1st place) Kamchatka region team

Relay 4*200 freestyle (1st place) Kamchatka region team

Russian National Championship, Moscow July 2007:

800 freestyle 08.53,40 (3rd place)

Russian National Cup Short Course, Volgograd 31.10-03.11.2007:

100 freestyle 00.57,78 (16th place)

200 freestyle 02.04,52 (15th place)

400 freestyle 04.14,96 (3rd place)

800 freestyle 08.45,05 (4th place)

Russian National Championship 2008:

800 м в/с 08.43,86 (2nd place)

Russian National Cup, Volgograd November 2008:

400 freestyle 04.21,15 (7th place)

800 freestyle 08.56,60 (9th place)

200 freestyle 02.11,04

Russian National Cup Short Course, Volgograd 2009:

400 freestyle 04.09,31 (2nd place)

800 freestyle 08.34,13 (2nd place)

XXV World Universiade, Belgrade (Serbia) 05–11.07.2009:

400 freestyle 04.17,64 (8th place)

FINA World Cup Short Course, Moscow 06–07.11.2009:

200 freestyle 02.05,14 (24th place)

400 freestyle 04.10,33 (6th place)

Russian National Championship, Moscow 2010:

400 freestyle 04.21,07 (5th place)

800 freestyle 09.02,56 (8th place)

Relay 4*200 freestyle (1st place) Saint Petersburg team

Championship of the Russian Student Union 2010:

400 IM (2nd place)

Relay 4*50 freestyle (1st place)

Russian National Championship, Moscow 2011:

200 freestyle 02.07,58 (28th place)

400 freestyle 04.25,56 (10th place)

800 freestyle 09.07,63 (10th place)

Relay 4*100 freestyle 03.55,83 (5th place)

Relay 4*200 freestyle 09.07,63 (2nd place)

Russian National Championship, Moscow 2012:

Relay 4*200 freestyle 08.28,32 (3rd place) Saint Petersberg team

III All-Russian Summer Universiade, Khanty-Mansiysk 2012:

Relay 4*100 freestyle 03.58,51 (2nd place) FEFU team

II stage of IV Summer All-Russian Universiade, Vladivostok 21–23.05.2014:

50 freestyle 00.28,47 (3rd place)

50 butterfly 00.30,56 (3rd place)

100 freestyle 01.02,24 (2nd place)

Relay 4*50 freestyle (1st place) FEFU team

Relay 4*100 freestyle (1st place) FEFU team

=== Masters ===
Since 2013, Regina Sych has taken part in competitions in the Masters category, performing as a member of the Pregel swimming club (Kaliningrad). She is a multiple winner of the Russian National Masters Cup 2013 (100,200,400 freestyle, 2nd place - 50 freestyle). She is also a multiple champion of Poland, Lithuania in Masters category (since 2014).

In 2015, she successfully performed at the Masters World Aquatics Championship in Kazan, took one silver (400 freestyle) and two bronzes (100 and 200 freestyle).

In August 2017, at the Masters World Aquatics Championships in Budapest (Hungary), won the distance 100 freestyle (59.56). She also won a silver medal in 50 freestyle (27.31). Regina Sych stopped a step away from the medals in 200 freestyle (02.15.06).

In July 2019, at the European Masters Games in Turin (Italy), she won three gold medals in 50 freestyle (27.98), 50 butterfly (30.15) and 100 freestyle (1.00.57).

In February 2024, at the Masters World Aquatics Championships in Doha (Qatar), scored the gold in the 50 freestyle (27.80) and the silver in the 100 freestyle (1.01.02).

Currently, Regina Sych works as a coach in Kaliningrad and continues to compete in the Masters category.
