= Agata Korc =

Polish swimmer

Personal information
- Born: 27 March 1986 (age 39); Zgorzelec, Poland
- Height: 1.75 m (5 ft 9 in)
- Weight: 58 kg (128 lb)

Sport
- Sport: Swimming
- Club: AZS AWF Wrocław

Agata Ewa Korc (born 27 March 1986) is a Polish swimmer. She competed at the 2008 Summer Olympics in the 50 m and 100 m freestyle events, but did not reach the finals.
