= Yevgeniy Natsvin =

Russian swimmer

Personal information
- Born: September 23, 1985 (age 40)

Sport
- Sport: Swimming
Medal record
Men's swimming
Representing Russia
European Championships (LC)
Silver medal – second place	2004 Madrid	4×200 m freestyle

Yevgeniy Natsvin (born September 23, 1985) is a freestyle swimmer from Russia, who won a silver in the men's 4×100 metres freestyle relay event at the 2004 European Championships in Madrid, Spain. He represented his native country at the 2004 Summer Olympics in Athens, Greece, where he was eliminated in the preliminary heats of the 4×200 m freestyle.
