= List of individual gold medalists in swimming at the Olympics and World Aquatics Championships (women) =

This is an overview of the women's swimming champions in individual events at the Olympics and the World Aquatics Championships. These tournaments are the only global long course (50 meter pool) swimming championships organized by world swimming federation FINA. This list gives an overview of the dominant swimmers throughout the history of swimming.

Currently, the Olympic program includes 14 individual events, and the World Championships program 17. These numbers were lower in the past, as shown in the table.

Asterisks (*) link to the event article. Use the sort function in the left-hand column to separate Olympics and World Championships.

Year	Freestyle						Backstroke			Breaststroke			Butterfly			Individual medley	
Year	50 m	100 m	200 m	400 m	800 m	1500 m	50 m	100 m	200 m	50 m	100 m	200 m	50 m	100 m	200 m	200 m	400 m
OG 1912	–	Durack*	–	–	–	–	–	–	–	–	–	–	–	–	–	–	–
OG 1920	–	Bleibtrey*	–	Bleibtrey* (300 m)	–	–	–	–	–	–	–	–	–	–	–	–	–
OG 1924	–	Lackie*	–	Norelius*	–	–	–	Bauer*	–	–	–	Morton*	–	–	–	–	–
OG 1928	–	Osipowich*	–	Norelius*	–	–	–	Braun*	–	–	–	Schrader*	–	–	–	–	–
OG 1932	–	Madison*	–	Madison*	–	–	–	Holm*	–	–	–	Dennis*	–	–	–	–	–
OG 1936	–	Mastenbroek*	–	Mastenbroek*	–	–	–	Senff*	–	–	–	Maehata*	–	–	–	–	–
OG 1948	–	Andersen*	–	Curtis*	–	–	–	Harup*	–	–	–	van Vliet*	–	–	–	–	–
OG 1952	–	Szőke*	–	Gyenge*	–	–	–	Harrison*	–	–	–	Székely*	–	–	–	–	–
OG 1956	–	Fraser*	–	Crapp*	–	–	–	Grinham*	–	–	–	Happe*	–	Mann*	–	–	–
OG 1960	–	Fraser*	–	von Saltza*	–	–	–	Burke*	–	–	–	Lonsbrough*	–	Schuler*	–	–	–
OG 1964	–	Fraser*	–	Duenkel*	–	–	–	Ferguson*	–	–	–	Prozumensh-chikova*	–	Stouder*	–	–	de Varona*
OG 1968	–	Henne*	Meyer*	Meyer*	Meyer*	–	–	Hall*	Watson*	–	Bjedov*	Wichman*	–	McClements*	Kok*	Kolb*	Kolb*
OG 1972	–	Neilson*	Gould*	Gould*	Rothhammer*	–	–	Belote*	Belote *	–	Carr*	Whitfield*	–	Aoki*	Moe*	Gould*	Neall*
WC 1973	–	Ender*	Rothhammer*	Greenwood*	Calligaris*	–	–	Richter*	Belote*	–	Vogel*	Vogel*	–	Ender*	Kother*	Hübner*	Wegner*
WC 1975	–	Ender*	Babashoff*	Babashoff*	Turrall*	–	–	Richter*	Treiber*	–	Anke*	Anke*	–	Ender*	Kother*	Heddy*	Tauber*
OG 1976	–	Ender*	Ender*	Thümer*	Thümer*	–	–	Richter*	Richter*	–	Anke*	Kosheveya*	–	Ender*	Pollack*	–	Tauber*
WC 1978	–	Krause*	Woodhead*	Wickham*	Wickham*	–	–	Jezek*	Jezek*	–	Bogdanova*	Kačiušytė*	–	Pennington*	Caulkins*	Caulkins*	Caulkins*
OG 1980	–	Krause*	Krause*	Diers*	Ford*	–	–	Reinisch*	Reinisch*	–	Geweniger*	Kačiušytė*	–	Metschuck*	Geissler*	–	Schneider*
WC 1982	–	Meineke*	Verstappen*	Schmidt*	Linehan*	–	–	Otto*	Sirch*	–	Geweniger*	Varganova*	–	Meagher*	Geissler*	Schneider*	Schneider*
OG 1984	–	Steinseifer & Hogshead*	Wayte*	Cohen*	Cohen*	–	–	Andrews*	de Rover*	–	van Staveren*	Ottenbrite*	–	Meagher*	Meagher*	Caulkins *	Caulkins *
WC 1986	Costache*	Otto*	Friedrich *	Friedrich *	Strauss*	–	–	Mitchell*	Sirch*	–	Gerasch*	Hörner*	–	Gressler*	Meagher*	Otto*	Nord*
OG 1988	Otto*	Otto*	Friedrich*	Evans*	Evans*	–	–	Otto*	Egerszegi*	–	Danga-lakova*	Hörner*	–	Otto*	Nord*	Hunger*	Evans*
WC 1991	Zhuang*	Haislett*	Lewis*	Evans*	Evans*	–	–	Egerszegi*	Egerszegi*	–	Frame*	Volkova*	–	Qian*	Sanders*	Lin*	Lin*
OG 1992	Yang*	Zhuang*	Haislett*	Hase*	Evans*	–	–	Egerszegi*	Egerszegi*	–	Rudkov-skaya*	Iwasaki*	–	Hong*	Sanders*	Lin*	Egerszegi*
WC 1994	Le*	Le*	van Almsick*	Yang*	Evans*	–	–	He*	He*	–	Riley*	Riley*	–	Liu*	Liu*	Lü*	Dai*
OG 1996	Van Dyken*	Le*	Poll*	Smith*	Bennett*	–	–	Botsford*	Egerszegi*	–	Heyns*	Heyns*	–	Van Dyken*	O'Neill*	Smith*	Smith*
WC 1998	Van Dyken*	Thompson*	Poll*	Chen*	Bennett*	–	–	Loveless-Maurer*	Maracineanu*	–	Kowal*	Kovács*	–	Thompson*	O'Neill*	Wu*	Chen*
OG 2000	de Bruijn*	de Bruijn*	O'Neill*	Bennett*	Bennett*	–	–	Mocanu*	Mocanu*	–	Quann*	Kovács*	–	de Bruijn*	Hyman*	Klochkova*	Klochkova*
WC 2001	de Bruijn*	de Bruijn*	Rooney*	Klochkova*	Stockbauer*	Stockbauer*	Cope*	Coughlin*	Mocanu*	Luo*	Luo*	Kovács*	de Bruijn*	Thomas*	Thomas*	Bowen*	Klochkova*
WC 2003	de Bruijn*	Seppälä*	Popchanka*	Stockbauer*	Stockbauer*	Stockbauer*	Zhivan-evskaya*	Busch-schulte*	Sexton*	Luo*	Luo*	Beard*	de Bruijn*	Thompson*	Jędrzejczak*	Klochkova*	Klochkova*
OG 2004	de Bruijn*	Henry*	Potec*	Manaudou*	Shibata*	–	–	Coughlin*	Coventry*	–	Luo*	Beard*	–	Thomas*	Jędrzejczak*	Klochkova*	Klochkova*
WC 2005	Lenton*	Henry*	Figuès*	Manaudou*	Ziegler*	Ziegler*	Rooney*	Coventry*	Coventry*	Edmistone*	Jones*	Jones*	Miatke*	Schipper*	Jędrzejczak*	Hoff*	Hoff*
WC 2007	Lenton*	Lenton*	Manaudou*	Manaudou*	Ziegler*	Ziegler*	Vaziri*	Coughlin*	Hoelzer*	Hardy*	Jones*	Jones*	Alshammar*	Lenton*	Schipper*	Hoff*	Hoff*
OG 2008	Steffen*	Steffen*	Pellegrini*	Adlington*	Adlington*	–	–	Coughlin*	Coventry*	–	Jones*	Soni*	–	Trickett*	Liu*	Rice*	Rice*
WC 2009	Steffen*	Steffen*	Pellegrini*	Pellegrini*	Friis*	Filippi*	Zhao*	Spofforth*	Coventry*	Yefimova*	Soni*	Higl*	Guehrer*	Sjöström*	Schipper*	Kukors*	Hosszú*
WC 2011	Alshammar*	Ottesen & Gerasimenya*	Pellegrini*	Pellegrini*	Adlington*	Friis*	Zuyeva*	Zhao*	Franklin*	Hardy*	Soni*	Soni*	Dekker*	Vollmer*	Jiao*	Ye*	Beisel*
OG 2012	Kromo-widjojo*	Kromo-widjojo*	Schmitt*	Muffat*	Ledecky*	–	–	Franklin*	Franklin*	–	Meilutytė*	Soni*	–	Vollmer*	Jiao*	Ye*	Ye*
WC 2013	Kromo-widjojo*	C.Campbell*	Franklin*	Ledecky*	Ledecky*	Ledecky*	Zhao*	Franklin*	Franklin*	Yefimova*	Meilutytė*	Yefimova*	Ottesen*	Sjöström*	Liu*	Hosszú*	Hosszú*
WC 2015	B.Campbell*	B.Campbell*	Ledecky*	Ledecky*	Ledecky*	Ledecky*	Fu*	Seebohm*	Seebohm*	Johansson*	Yefimova*	Watanabe*	Sjöström*	Sjöström*	Hoshi*	Hosszú*	Hosszú*
OG 2016	Blume*	Manuel & Oleksiak*	Ledecky*	Ledecky*	Ledecky*	–	–	Hosszú*	DiRado*	–	King*	Kaneto*	–	Sjöström*	Belmonte*	Hosszú*	Hosszú*
WC 2017	Sjöström*	Manuel*	Pellegrini*	Ledecky*	Ledecky*	Ledecky*	Medeiros*	Masse*	Seebohm*	King*	King*	Yefimova*	Sjöström*	Sjöström*	Belmonte*	Hosszú*	Hosszú*
WC 2019	Manuel*	Manuel*	Pellegrini*	Titmus*	Ledecky*	Quadarella*	Smoliga*	Masse*	Smith*	King*	King*	Yefimova*	Sjöström*	MacNeil*	Kapás*	Hosszú*	Hosszú *
OG 2020	McKeon*	McKeon*	Titmus*	Titmus*	Ledecky*	Ledecky*	–	McKeown*	McKeown*	–	Jacoby*	Schoenmaker*	–	MacNeil*	Zhang*	Ohashi*	Ohashi*
WC 2022	Sjöström*	O'Callaghan*	Yang*	Ledecky*	Ledecky*	Ledecky*	Masse*	Smith*	McKeown*	Meilutytė*	Pilato*	King*	Sjöström*	Huske*	McIntosh*	A Walsh*	McIntosh*
WC 2023	Sjöström*	O'Callaghan*	O'Callaghan*	Titmus*	Ledecky*	Ledecky*	McKeown*	McKeown*	McKeown*	Meilutytė*	Meilutytė*	Schoenmaker*	Sjöström*	Zhang*	McIntosh*	Douglass*	McIntosh*
WC 2024	Sjöström*	Steenbergen*	Haughey*	Fairweather*	Quadarella*	Quadarella*	Curzan*	Curzan*	Curzan*	Meilutytė*	Tang*	Schouten*	Sjöström*	Köhler*	Stephens*	Douglass*	Colbert*
OG 2024	Sjöström*	Sjöström*	O'Callaghan*	Titmus*	Ledecky*	Ledecky*	–	McKeown*	McKeown*	–	Smith*	Douglass*	–	Huske*	McIntosh*	McIntosh*	McIntosh*
WC 2025	Harris*	Steenbergen*	O'Callaghan*	McIntosh*	Ledecky*	Ledecky*	Berkoff*	McKeown*	McKeown*	Meilutytė*	Elendt*	Douglass*	G Walsh*	G Walsh*	McIntosh*	McIntosh*	McIntosh*

Note: Only events that are presently contested have their own column in the above table. At the 1920 Olympics, a 300-meter freestyle event was held. The champion in this event has been placed in the 400-meter freestyle column.

== Title leaders ==
- The leaders in these events are listed below. All swimmers with at least three individual titles are included. Note that this list favors more recent swimmers due to the increasing number of events held, and the introduction and increasing frequency of the World Championships.

Asterisks (*) and bold denote active swimmers

Rank	Name	Year of birth	Total titles	Olympic Games	World Championships	Time span
1.	(United States) **Katie Ledecky***	1997	26	8	18	2012–2025 (14)
2.	(Sweden) **Sarah Sjöström***	1993	17	3	14	2009–2024 (16)
3.	(Hungary) Katinka Hosszú	1989	12	3	9	2009–2019 (11)
4.	(Canada) **Summer McIntosh***	2006	11	3	8	2022–2025 (4)
5.	(Australia) **Kaylee McKeown***	2001	10	4	6	2021–2025 (5)
6.	(Netherlands) Inge de Bruijn	1973	9	4	5	2000–2004 (5)
7.	(Ukraine) Yana Klochkova	1982	8	4	4	2000–2004 (5)
8.	(Hungary) Krisztina Egerszegi	1974	7	5	2	1988–1996 (9)
8.	(United States) Janet Evans	1971	7	4	3	1988–1994 (7)
8.	(East Germany) Kristin Otto	1966	7	4	3	1982–1988 (7)
8.	(East Germany) Kornelia Ender	1958	7	3	4	1973–1976 (4)
8.	(Italy) Federica Pellegrini	1988	7	1	6	2008–2019 (12)
8.	(Lithuania) **Rūta Meilutytė***	1997	7	1	6	2012–2025 (14)
14.	(United States) Missy Franklin	1995	6	2	4	2011–2013 (3)
14.	(United States) Lilly King	1997	6	1	5	2016–2022 (7)
14.	(Russia) **Yuliya Yefimova***	1992	6	0	6	2009–2019 (11)
17.	(Australia) Ariarne Titmus	2000	5	3	2	2019–2024 (6)
17.	(United States) Tracy Caulkins	1963	5	2	3	1978–1984 (7)
17.	(Zimbabwe) Kirsty Coventry	1983	5	2	3	2004–2009 (6)
17.	(United States) Rebecca Soni	1987	5	2	3	2008–2012 (5)
17.	(China) Luo Xuejuan	1984	5	1	4	2001–2004 (4)
17.	(Australia) Leisel Jones	1985	5	1	4	2005–2008 (4)
17.	(Australia) Libby Trickett (Lenton)	1985	5	1	4	2005–2008 (4)
17.	(Australia) **Mollie O'Callaghan***	2004	5	1	4	2022–2025 (4)
17.	(Germany) Hannah Stockbauer	1982	5	0	5	2001–2003 (3)
26.	(United States) Brooke Bennett	1980	4	3	1	1996–2000 (5)
26.	(East Germany) Ulrike Richter	1959	4	2	2	1973–1976 (4)
26.	(United States) Mary T. Meagher	1964	4	2	2	1982–1986 (5)
26.	(United States) Natalie Coughlin	1982	4	2	2	2001–2008 (8)
26.	(Germany) Britta Steffen	1983	4	2	2	2008–2009 (2)
26.	(France) Laure Manaudou	1986	4	1	3	2004–2007 (4)
26.	(United States) **Simone Manuel***	1996	4	1	3	2016–2019 (4)
26.	(United States) **Kate Douglass***	2001	4	1	3	2023–2025 (3)
26.	(United States) Kate Ziegler	1988	4	0	4	2005–2007 (3)
26.	(United States) Katie Hoff	1989	4	0	4	2005–2007 (3)
36.	(Australia) Dawn Fraser	1937	3	3	0	1956–1964 (9)
36.	(United States) Debbie Meyer	1952	3	3	0	1968 (1)
36.	(Australia) Shane Gould	1956	3	3	0	1972 (1)
36.	(Republic of Ireland) Michelle Smith	1969	3	3	0	1996 (1)
36.	(United States) Melissa Belote	1956	3	2	1	1972–1973 (2)
36.	(East Germany) Barbara Krause	1959	3	2	1	1978–1980 (3)
36.	(United States) Amy Van Dyken	1973	3	2	1	1996–1998 (3)
36.	(Australia) Susie O'Neill	1973	3	2	1	1996–2000 (5)
36.	(Romania) Diana Mocanu	1984	3	2	1	2000–2001 (2)
36.	(United Kingdom) Rebecca Adlington	1989	3	2	1	2008–2011 (4)
36.	(Netherlands) Ranomi Kromowidjojo	1990	3	2	1	2012–2013 (2)
36.	(China) **Ye Shiwen***	1996	3	2	1	2011–2012 (2)
36.	(South Africa) Tatjana Smith	1997	3	2	1	2021–2024 (4)
36.	(East Germany) Hannelore Anke	1957	3	1	2	1975–1976 (2)
36.	(East Germany) Petra Schneider	1963	3	1	2	1980–1982 (3)
36.	(East Germany) Heike Friedrich	1970	3	1	2	1986–1988 (3)
36.	(China) Lin Li	1970	3	1	2	1991–1992 (2)
36.	(Australia) Petria Thomas	1975	3	1	2	2001–2004 (4)
36.	(Hungary) Ágnes Kovács	1981	3	1	2	1998–2001 (4)
36.	(Poland) Otylia Jędrzejczak	1983	3	1	2	2003–2005 (3)
36.	(United States) Jenny Thompson	1973	3	0	3	1998–2003 (6)
36.	(Australia) Jessicah Schipper	1986	3	0	3	2005–2009 (5)
36.	(China) Zhao Jing	1990	3	0	3	2009–2013 (5)
36.	(Australia) Emily Seebohm	1992	3	0	3	2015–2017 (3)
36.	(Canada) **Kylie Masse***	1996	3	0	3	2017–2022 (6)
36.	(Italy) **Simona Quadarella***	1998	3	0	3	2019–2024 (6)
36.	(United States) **Claire Curzan***	2004	3	0	3	2024 (1)

== See also ==
- List of individual gold medalists in swimming at the Olympics and World Aquatics Championships (men)
- List of gold medalist relay teams in swimming at the Olympics and World Aquatics Championships
- List of Olympic medalists in swimming (women)
- List of World Aquatics Championships medalists in swimming (women)
- List of top Olympic gold medalists in swimming
