= Swimming at the 2005 World Aquatics Championships – Women's 800 metre freestyle =

Women's 800m Freestyle at the 2005 FINA World Aquatics Championships
- Dates: 29 July (heats); 30 July (final)
- Competitors: 33 from 23 nations
- Winning time: 8 minutes 25.31 seconds

Medalists
gold medal	Kate Ziegler	United States
silver medal	Brittany Reimer	Canada
bronze medal	Ai Shibata	Japan

The Women's 800 Freestyle event at the 11th FINA World Aquatics Championships swam 29 – 30 July 2005 in Montreal, Quebec, Canada. Preliminary heats were held in the Championships morning session on 29 July, with the top-8 finishers advancing to swim-again in the event's Final on 30 July.

At the start of the event, the existing World (WR) and Championships (CR) records were:

- WR: 8:16.22, Janet Evans (USA), swum 20 August 1989 in Tokyo, Japan
- CR: 8:23.66, Hannah Stockbauer (Germany), swum 26 July 2003 in Barcelona, Spain

Note: no new World or Championships records were set during this competition.

== Results ==
=== Preliminary heats ===
Rank	Heat + Lane	Swimmer	Nation	Time	Notes
1	H5 L7	Brittany Reimer	Canada	8:30.96	q
2	H5 L5	Ai Shibata	Japan	8:30.98	q
3	H4 L6	Flavia Rigamonti	Switzerland	8:33.34	q
4	H4 L4	Rebecca Cooke	Great Britain	8:33.48	q
5	H5 L2	Jana Henke	Germany	8:35.73	q
6	H3 L4	Kate Ziegler	United States	8:35.81	q
7	H4 L2	Camelia Potec	Romania	8:36.21	q
8	H4 L5	Erika Villaécija	Spain	8:37.42	q
9	H5 L6	Sachiko Yamada	Japan	8:37.70	
10	H3 L2	Laura Conway	United States	8:37.90	
11	H3 L3	Linda Mackenzie	Australia	8:38.27	
12	H3 L6	Lotte Friis	Denmark	8:41.91	
13	H4 L1	Éva Risztov	Hungary	8:42.81	
14	H4 L7	Elisa Pasini	Italy	8:42.88	
15	H5 L1	Kristel Köbrich	Chile	8:46.90	
16	H5 L8	Tanya Hunks	Canada	8:47.55	
17	H3 L5	Simona Păduraru	Romania	8:48.06	
18	H3 L1	Sophie Huber	France	8:48.37	
19	H2 L3	Cecilia Biagioli	Argentina	8:48.85	
20	H4 L3	Hua Chen	China	8:49.46	
21	H2 L4	Olga Beresneva	Israel	8:50.59	
22	H2 L5	Youn Jeong Seo	South Korea	8:51.39	
23	H5 L3	Haylee Reddaway	Australia	8:51.99	
24	H3 L7	Jingzhi Tang	China	8:53.47	
25	H2 L6	Chin-Kuei Yang	Chinese Taipei	9:07.25	
26	H2 L2	Paola Duguet	Colombia	9:14.00	
27	H1 L5	Shrone Austin	Seychelles	9:14.44	
28	H2 L7	Ting Wen Quah	Singapore	9:20.93	
29	H4 L8	Wan-Tong Cheng	Chinese Taipei	9:23.48	
30	H1 L4	Wan Ting Goh	Singapore	9:32.68	
-	H1 L3	Ea Hyun Jung	South Korea	DNS	
-	H3 L8	Teresia Gimholt	Sweden	DNS	
-	H5 L4	Laure Manaudou	France	DNS	

=== Final heat ===
Place	Swimmer	Nation	Time	Notes
1st place, gold medalist(s)	Kate Ziegler	(United States) USA	8:25.31	
2nd place, silver medalist(s)	Brittany Reimer	Canada	8:27.59	
3rd place, bronze medalist(s)	Ai Shibata	Japan	8:27.86	
4	Flavia Rigamonti	Switzerland	8:28.74	
5	Camelia Potec	Romania	8:34.40	
6	Erika Villaécija	Spain	8:36.34	
7	Rebecca Cooke	(United Kingdom) Great Britain	8:37.98	
8	Jana Henke	Germany	8:38.23	
