= Swimming at the 2004 Summer Olympics – Women's 800 metre freestyle =

Women's 800 metre freestyle at the Games of the XXVIII Olympiad
- Venue: Athens Olympic Aquatic Centre
- Date: August 19, 2004 (heats); August 20, 2004 (final)
- Competitors: 31 from 26 nations
- Winning time: 8:24.54

Medalists
1st place, gold medalist(s)		Ai Shibata	Japan
2nd place, silver medalist(s)		Laure Manaudou	France
3rd place, bronze medalist(s)		Diana Munz	United States

The women's 800 metre freestyle event at the 2004 Olympic Games was contested at the Olympic Aquatic Centre of the Athens Olympic Sports Complex in Athens, Greece on August 19 and 20. The winning margin was 0.42 seconds which as of 2023 remains the narrowest winning margin in this event at the Olympics.

Japan's Ai Shibata became the first Asian swimmer to win an Olympic gold medal in long-distance freestyle swimming, outside the record time of 8:24.54. France's Laure Manaudou, who claimed the title in the 400 m freestyle, added a silver to her medal tally, with a time of 8:24.96. U.S. swimmer Diana Munz, on the other hand, edged out her teammate Kalyn Keller for the bronze medal by 0.36 of a second, clocking at 8:26.61.

== Records ==
Prior to this competition, the existing world and Olympic records were as follows.

World record	Janet Evans (USA)	8:16.22	Tokyo, Japan	20 August 1989
Olympic record	Brooke Bennett (USA)	8:19.67	Sydney, Australia	22 September 2000

== Results ==
=== Heats ===
Rank	Heat	Lane	Name	Nationality	Time	Notes
1	4	3	Laure Manaudou	France	8:25.91	Q
2	3	2	Rebecca Cooke	Great Britain	8:28.47	Q
3	3	5	Ai Shibata	Japan	8:30.08	Q
4	2	4	Diana Munz	United States	8:30.87	Q
5	2	3	Jana Henke	Germany	8:31.86	Q
6	4	5	Kalyn Keller	United States	8:32.36	Q
7	4	6	Erika Villaécija	Spain	8:33.61	Q
8	2	6	Simona Păduraru	Romania	8:34.15	Q
9	2	2	Sarah Paton	Australia	8:35.81	
10	3	6	Linda Mackenzie	Australia	8:35.90	
11	4	2	Chen Hua	China	8:36.24	
12	3	4	Sachiko Yamada	Japan	8:36.48	
13	4	7	Flavia Rigamonti	Switzerland	8:38.10	
14	4	4	Hannah Stockbauer	Germany	8:38.17	
15	4	8	Kristel Köbrich	Chile	8:40.41	
16	3	3	Camelia Potec	Romania	8:41.20	
17	2	5	Brittany Reimer	Canada	8:41.55	
18	2	1	Marianna Lymperta	Greece	8:42.65	
19	3	1	Jana Pechanová	Czech Republic	8:47.38	
20	2	7	Olga Beresnyeva	Ukraine	8:57.96	
21	1	2	Golda Marcus	El Salvador	8:59.81	
22	1	4	Kwon You-ri	South Korea	9:01.42	
23	1	3	Jelena Petrova	Estonia	9:01.62	
24	3	8	Rebecca Linton	New Zealand	9:02.41	
25	1	7	Heather Roffey	Cayman Islands	9:02.88	
26	2	8	Ivanka Moralieva	Bulgaria	9:03.13	
27	1	6	Paola Duguet	Colombia	9:06.96	
28	1	5	Anita Galić	Croatia	9:10.91	
29	1	1	Khadija Ciss	Senegal	9:20.06	
	3	7	Éva Risztov	Hungary	DNS	
	4	1	Anja Čarman	Slovenia	DNS	

=== Final ===
Rank	Lane	Swimmer	Nation	Time	Notes
1st place, gold medalist(s)	3	Ai Shibata	Japan	8:24.54	
2nd place, silver medalist(s)	4	Laure Manaudou	France	8:24.96	
3rd place, bronze medalist(s)	6	Diana Munz	United States	8:26.61	
4	7	Kalyn Keller	United States	8:26.97	
5	1	Erika Villaécija	Spain	8:29.04	
6	5	Rebecca Cooke	Great Britain	8:29.37	
7	2	Jana Henke	Germany	8:33.95	
8	8	Simona Păduraru	Romania	8:37.02	
