= Swimming at the 2003 World Aquatics Championships – Women's 1500 metre freestyle =

Women's 1500m Freestyle at the 2003 FINA World Aquatics Championships
- Venue: Palau Sant Jordi
- Dates: 21 July (prelims); 22 July (final)
- Winning time: 16 minutes 0.18 seconds

Medalists
gold medal	Hannah Stockbauer	Germany
silver medal	Hayley Peirsol	United States
bronze medal	Jana Henke	Germany

The Women's 1500m Freestyle event at the 10th FINA World Aquatics Championships swam on 21–22 July 2003 in Barcelona, Spain. Preliminary heats swam during the morning session on July 21, with the top-8 finishers advancing to swim again in the event's Final during the evening session on July 22.

At the start of the event, the World (WR) and Championship (CR) records were:

- WR: 15:52.10 swum by Janet Evans (USA) on March 26, 1988 in Orlando, USA.
- CR: 16:01.02 swum by Hannah Stockbauer (Germany) on July 28, 2001 in Fukuoka, Japan

== Results ==
=== Final ===
Place	Swimmer	Nation	Time	Notes
1	Hannah Stockbauer	Germany	16:00.18	CR
2	Hayley Peirsol	USA	16:09.64	
3	Jana Henke	Germany	16:10.13	
4	Regina Sych	Russia	16:13.13	NR
5	Diana Munz	USA	16:14.28	
6	Brittany Reimer	Canada	16:15.98	
7	Rebecca Cooke	Great Britain	16:20.41	
8	Chen Hua	China	16:29.06	

=== Preliminaries ===
Rank	Heat+Lane	Swimmer	Nation	Time	Notes
1	H2 L5	Chen Hua	China	16:15.55	q
2	H1 L4	Jana Henke	Germany	16:15.93	q
3	H3 L4	Hannah Stockbauer	Germany	16:15.95	q
4	H3 L3	Brittany Reimer	Canada	16:16.21	q
5	H2 L4	Diana Munz	United States	16:16.78	q
6	H1 L5	Rebecca Cooke	Great Britain	16:17.95	q
7	H2 L8	Hayley Peirsol	United States	16:20.34	q
8	H1 L2	Regina Sych	Russia	16:23.33	q
9	H3 L6	Simona Păduraru	Romania	16:25.50	
10	H1 L1	Olga Beresneva	Ukraine	16:27.76	NR
11	H2 L7	Erika Villaécija	Spain	16:32.17	
12	H2 L2	Ai Shibata	Japan	16:32.19	
13	H2 L3	Taryn Lencoe	Canada	16:35.83	
14	H1 L6	Amanda Pascoe	Australia	16:38.70	
15	H3 L1	Jana Pechanová	Czech Republic	16:39.75	
16	H2 L6	Réka Nagy	Hungary	16:41.81	
17	H3 L2	Nayara Ribeiro	Brazil	16:43.97	
18	H3 L5	Sashiko Yamada	Japan	16:45.48	
19	H3 L7	Sarah Paton	Australia	16:57.10	
20	H2 L1	Anja Čarman	Slovenia	16:58.64	
21	H1 L7	Maria Bulakhova	Russia	17:00.55	
22	H1 L3	Zhang Yan	China	17:14.85	
23	H3 L8	Andrea De León	Uruguay	18:05.05	
