= Swimming at the 2005 World Aquatics Championships – Women's 400 metre freestyle =

Women's 400 Freestyle at the 2005 FINA World Aquatics Championships
- Dates: 24 July 2005
- Competitors: 37 from 25 nations
- Winning time: 4 minutes 06.44 seconds

Medalists
gold medal	Laure Manaudou	France
silver medal	Ai Shibata	Japan
bronze medal	Caitlin McClatchey	Great Britain

The Women's 400 Freestyle at the 11th FINA World Aquatics Championships was swum on 24 July 2005 in Montreal, Quebec, Canada. Preliminary heats were swum that morning, with the top-8 finishers advancing to swim the race again in that evenings Final.

As the competition was held in a long course (50m) pool, the race consisted of 8 lengths of freestyle.

At the start of the event, the existing World (WR) and Championships (CR) records were:

- WR: 4:03.85, Janet Evans (USA), swum 22 September 1988 in Seoul, South Korea;
- CR: 4:06.28, Tracey Wickham (Australia), swum 24 August 1978 in Berlin, Germany.

== Results ==
=== Prelims ===
Rank	Heat + Lane	Swimmer	Nation	Time	Notes
1	H3 L2	Brittany Reimer	Canada	4:08.28	q
2	H3 L5	Camelia Potec	Romania	4:08.40	q
3	H3 L4	Ai Shibata	Japan	4:08.82	q
4	H5 L5	Joanne Jackson	Great Britain	4:10.47	q
5	H4 L4	Caitlin McClatchey	Great Britain	4:10.48	q
6	H4 L3	Claudia Poll	Costa Rica	4:10.88	q
7	H4 L5	Linda Mackenzie	Australia	4:11.13	q
8	H5 L4	Laure Manaudou	France	4:11.46	q
9	H5 L3	Haylee Reddaway	Australia	4:11.75	
10	H5 L6	Carly Piper	United States	4:12.96	
11	H4 L2	Jana Henke	Germany	4:13.68	
12	H4 L6	Sachiko Yamada	Japan	4:13.97	
13	H5 L2	Éva Risztov	Hungary	4:14.10	
14	H5 L7	Cecilia Biagioli	Argentina	4:14.48	
15	H3 L7	Sophie Huber	France	4:15.53	
16	H3 L6	Kelsey Ditto	United States	4:15.63	
17	H3 L1	Melissa Corfe	South Africa	4:15.95	
18	H4 L1	Anja Čarman	Slovenia	4:16.28	
19	H2 L1	Mariana Brochado	Brazil	4:17.65	
20	H5 L8	Ji Eun Lee	South Korea	4:18.05	
21	H4 L8	Kristel Köbrich	Chile	4:18.41	
22	H3 L3	Jingzhi Tang	China	4:18.71	
23	H2 L4	Lauren Boyle	New Zealand	4:19.22	
24	H3 L8	Melissa Ingram	New Zealand	4:19.28	
25	H4 L7	Monique Ferreira	Brazil	4:19.42	
26	H2 L6	Olga Beresneva	Israel	4:24.27	
27	H2 L2	Chin-Kuei Yang	Chinese Taipei	4:26.03	
28	H2 L7	Ea Hyun Jung	South Korea	4:26.46	
29	H2 L3	Paola Duguet	Colombia	4:26.57	
30	H1 L2	Shrone Austin	Seychelles	4:28.36	
31	H1 L5	Jasna Ovsenik	Slovenia	4:28.43	
32	H2 L5	Wan-Tong Cheng	Chinese Taipei	4:31.39	
33	H2 L8	Ting Wen Quah	Singapore	4:31.48	
34	H1 L6	Nimitta Thaveesupsoonthorn	Thailand	4:33.39	
35	H1 L3	Wing Yan Fung	Hong Kong	4:35.34	
36	H1 L4	Wan Ting Goh	Singapore	4:35.56	
-	H5 L1	Tanya Hunks	Canada	DNS	

=== Final ===
Rank	Name	Nationality	Time	Notes
1st place, gold medalist(s)	Laure Manaudou	France	4:06.44	
2nd place, silver medalist(s)	Ai Shibata	Japan	4:06.74	
3rd place, bronze medalist(s)	Caitlin McClatchey	(United Kingdom) Great Britain	4:07.25	
4	Brittany Reimer	Canada	4:07.32	
5	Camelia Potec	Romania	4:08.06	
6	Linda Mackenzie	Australia	4:08.75	
7	Joanne Jackson	(United Kingdom) Great Britain	4:08.88	
8	Claudia Poll	Costa Rica	4:10.02	
