= 2006 Pan Pacific Swimming Championships – Women's 400 metre freestyle =

Women's 400 metre freestyle at the 2006 Pan Pacific Swimming Championships
- Venue: Saanich Commonwealth Place
- Dates: August 19, 2006 (heats & finals)
- Competitors: 28 from 11 nations
- Winning time: 4:07.61

Medalists
gold medal	Ai Shibata	Japan
silver medal	Katie Hoff	United States
bronze medal	Sachiko Yamada	Japan

The women's 400 metre freestyle competition at the 2006 Pan Pacific Swimming Championships took place on August 17 at the Saanich Commonwealth Place. The last champion was Diana Munz of US.

This race consisted of eight lengths of the pool, with all eight being in the freestyle stroke.

== Records ==
Prior to this competition, the existing world and Pan Pacific records were as follows:

World record	Laure Manaudou (FRA)	4:02.13	Budapest, Hungary	August 6, 2006
Pan Pacific Championships record	Janet Evans (USA)	4:04.53	Tokyo, Japan	August 19, 1989

== Results ==
All times are in minutes and seconds.

KEY:	q	Fastest non-qualifiers	Q	Qualified	CR	Championships record	NR	National record	PB	Personal best	SB	Seasonal best

=== Heats ===
The first round was held on August 19, at 10:00.

Rank	Heat	Lane	Name	Nationality	Time	Notes
1	3	5	Bronte Barratt	Australia	4:09.55	QA
2	3	4	Katie Hoff	United States	4:09.70	QA
3	4	4	Kate Ziegler	United States	4:10.94	QA
4	4	5	Ai Shibata	Japan	4:11.04	QA
5	4	3	Sachiko Yamada	Japan	4:11.22	QA
6	4	6	Kelsey Ditto	United States	4:12.04	QA
7	2	5	Linda Mackenzie	Australia	4:12.10	QA
8	2	4	Hayley Peirsol	United States	4:12.34	QA
9	2	2	Cecilia Biagioli	Argentina	4:13.54	QB
10	3	3	Kylie Palmer	Australia	4:13.72	QB
11	4	7	Claudia Poll	Costa Rica	4:13.95	QB
12	2	3	Ashleigh McCleery	Australia	4:14.90	QB
13	4	2	Brittany Reimer	Canada	4:14.92	QB
14	2	1	Tanya Hunks	Canada	4:15.00	QB
15	4	1	Melissa Gorman	Australia	4:15.34	QB
16	1	6	Savannah King	Canada	4:17.03	QB
17	3	6	Stephanie Williams	Australia	4:17.86	
18	1	4	Maya Beaudry	Canada	4:18.73	
19	3	8	Kristel Köbrich	Chile	4:18.74	
20	2	7	Lee Ji-Eun	South Korea	4:20.07	
21	1	5	Xia Chenying	China	4:20.75	
22	1	2	Haruka Ueda	Japan	4:21.09	
23	3	1	Lauren Boyle	New Zealand	4:21.30	
24	1	3	Mariana Brochado	Brazil	4:22.43	
25	4	8	Alexa Komarnycky	Canada	4:23.75	
26	3	2	Sarah Paton	Australia	4:24.01	
27	2	6	Helen Norfolk	New Zealand	4:25.39	
28	1	7	Lauren Arndt	Australia	4:28.72	
-	3	7	Kaitlin Sandeno	United States	DSQ	

=== B Final ===
The B final was held on August 19, at 18:00.

Rank	Lane	Name	Nationality	Time	Notes
9	5	Kylie Palmer	Australia	4:09.68	
10	4	Kelsey Ditto	United States	4:12.11	
11	3	Brittany Reimer	Canada	4:12.84	
12	6	Tanya Hunks	Canada	4:16.64	
13	7	Lee Ji-Eun	South Korea	4:16.91	
14	1	Xia Chenying	China	4:18.63	
15	2	Kristel Köbrich	Chile	4:20.11	
16	8	Haruka Ueda	Japan	4:22.69	

=== A Final ===
The A final was held on August 19, at 18:00.

Rank	Lane	Name	Nationality	Time	Notes
1st place, gold medalist(s)	6	Ai Shibata	Japan	4:07.61	
2nd place, silver medalist(s)	5	Katie Hoff	United States	4:07.98	
3rd place, bronze medalist(s)	2	Sachiko Yamada	Japan	4:08.42	
4	3	Kate Ziegler	United States	4:08.47	
5	4	Bronte Barratt	Australia	4:08.68	
6	7	Linda Mackenzie	Australia	4:09.95	
7	8	Claudia Poll	Costa Rica	4:12.45	
8	1	Cecilia Biagioli	Argentina	4:13.38	
