= 2006 Pan Pacific Swimming Championships – Women's 800 metre freestyle =

Women's swimming tournament

Women's 800 metre freestyle at the 2006 Pan Pacific Swimming Championships
- Venue: Saanich Commonwealth Place
- Dates: August 20, 2006 (heats & finals)
- Competitors: 18 from 7 nations
- Winning time: 8:24.56

Medalists
gold medal	Kate Ziegler	United States
silver medal	Ai Shibata	Japan
bronze medal	Hayley Peirsol	United States

The women's 800 metre freestyle competition at the 2006 Pan Pacific Swimming Championships took place on August 20 at the Saanich Commonwealth Place. The last champion was Diana Munz of US.

This event was a timed-final where each swimmer swam just once. The top 8 seeded swimmers swam in the evening, and the remaining swimmers swam in the morning session.

== Records ==
Prior to this competition, the existing world and Pan Pacific records were as follows:

World record	Janet Evans (USA)	8:16.22	Tokyo, Japan	August 20, 1989
Pan Pacific Championships record	Janet Evans (USA)	8:16.22	Tokyo, Japan	August 20, 1989

== Results ==
All times are in minutes and seconds.

KEY:	q	Fastest non-qualifiers	Q	Qualified	CR	Championships record	NR	National record	PB	Personal best	SB	Seasonal best

The first round was held on August 20, at 11:01, and the final was held on August 20, at 18:00.

Rank	Heat	Lane	Name	Nationality	Time	Notes
1st place, gold medalist(s)	3	5	Kate Ziegler	United States	8:24.56	
2nd place, silver medalist(s)	3	3	Ai Shibata	Japan	8:26.41	
3rd place, bronze medalist(s)	3	4	Hayley Peirsol	United States	8:27.57	
4	3	6	Sachiko Yamada	Japan	8:30.29	
5	1	3	Yurie Yano	Japan	8:34.45	
6	3	7	Brittany Reimer	Canada	8:37.84	
7	3	2	Melissa Gorman	Australia	8:37.90	
8	1	4	Kelsey Ditto	United States	8:38.34	
9	1	5	Linda Mackenzie	Australia	8:38.61	
10	3	8	Kristel Köbrich	Chile	8:40.95	
11	1	6	Tanya Hunks	Canada	8:41.43	
12	1	1	Cecilia Biagioli	Argentina	8:42.12	
13	3	1	Stephanie Williams	Australia	8:44.59	
14	1	7	Savannah King	Canada	8:45.21	
15	2	4	Lee Ji-Eun	South Korea	8:51.93	
16	1	8	Kylie Palmer	Australia	8:53.38	
17	2	5	Monica Stitski	Canada	8:56.29	
18	1	2	Sarah Paton	Australia	9:02.77	
