= Swimming at the 2007 World Aquatics Championships – Women's 1500 metre freestyle =

The Women's 1500 Freestyle at the 2007 World Aquatics Championships took place on the morning of March 26 (prelims) and the evening of March 27 (finals) at the Rod Laver Arena in Melbourne, Australia.

The existing records when the event started were:

- World Record (WR): 15:52.10, Janet Evans (USA), March 26, 1988, in Orlando, FL, USA.
- Championship Record (CR): 16:00.18, Hannah Stockbauer (Germany), Barcelona 2003 (Jul.22.2003)

== Results ==
=== Finals ===
Place	Name	Nationality	Time	Note
1st	Kate Ziegler	USA	15:53.05	CR
2nd	Flavia Rigamonti	Switzerland	15:55.38	ER
3rd	Ai Shibata	Japan	15:58.55	AS
4th	Erika Villaécija García	Spain	16:05.83	
5th	Hayley Peirsol	USA	16:12.84	
6th	Lotte Friis	Denmark	16:20.82	
7th	Kristel Köbrich	Chile	16:27.13	
8th	Laure Manaudou	France	16:42.17	

=== Preliminaries ===
Rank	Swimmer	Nation	Time	Note
1	Hayley Peirsol	USA	16:02.82	Q
2	Ai Shibata	Japan	16:05.92	Q
3	Kate Ziegler	USA	16:07.71	Q
4	Lotte Friis	Denmark	16:09.39	Q
5	Erika Villaécija García	Spain	16:09.40	Q
6	Laure Manaudou	France	16:12.16	Q
7	Flavia Rigamonti	Switzerland	16:19.33	Q
8	Kristel Köbrich	Chile	16:22.18	Q
9	Tan Miao	China	16:24.02	
10	Rebecca Cooke	Great Britain	16:26.83	
11	Tanya Hunks	Canada	16:26.95	
12	Brittany Reimer	Canada	16:30.43	
13	Sachiko Yamada	Japan	16:36.92	
14	Yu Rui	China	16:41.81	
15	Evelyn Verrasztó	Hungary	16:46.97	
16	Monika Mocnik	Slovenia	17:02.99	
17	Golda Marcus	El Salvador	17:17.04	
18	Carmen Nam	Hong Kong	17:17.68	
19	Ting Wen Quah	Singapore	17:26.12	
20	Lynette Lim	Singapore	17:28.28	
21	Shrone Austin	Seychelles	17:48.07	
22	Marja Alejandra Torres	Peru	18:11.27	
23	Fiorella Gomez-Sanchez	Peru	18:13.98	
24	Noufissa Chbihi	Morocco	19:23.12	
