= Swimming at the 2007 World Aquatics Championships – Women's 800 metre freestyle =

The Women's 800m Freestyle at the 2007 World Aquatics Championships took place on the morning of 30 March (prelims) and the evening of 31 March (finals) at the Rod Laver Arena in Melbourne, Australia.

The existing records when the event started were:

- World Record (WR): 8:16.22, Janet Evans (USA), 20 August 1989 in Tokyo, Japan.
- Championship Record (CR): 8:23.66, Hannah Stockbauer (Germany), Barcelona 2003 (Jul.26.2003)

== Results ==
=== Finals ===
Place	Name	Nationality	Time	Note
1st	Kate Ziegler	USA	8:18.52	CR
2nd	Laure Manaudou	France	8:18.80	ER
3rd	Hayley Peirsol	USA	8:26.41	
4th	Erika Villaécija García	Spain	8:27.59	
5th	Sophie Huber	France	8:28.23	
6th	Ai Shibata	Japan	8:31.73	
7th	Wendy Trott	South Africa	8:32.60	
8th	Kylie Palmer	Australia	8:34.96	

=== Preliminaries ===
Rank	Name	Nationality	Time	Note
1	Laure Manaudou	France	8:25.65	Q
2	Kate Ziegler	USA	8:28.11	Q
3	Kylie Palmer	Australia	8:29.36	Q
4	Erika Villaécija García	Spain	8:29.56	Q
5	Ai Shibata	Japan	8:29.58	Q
6	Sophie Huber	France	8:29.68	Q
7	Hayley Peirsol	USA	8:29.82	Q
8	Wendy Trott	South Africa	8:31.53	Q
9	Rebecca Cooke	Great Britain	8:35.25	
10	Rebecca Adlington	Great Britain	8:36.26	
11	Lotte Friis	Denmark	8:37.16	
12	TAN Miao	China	8:37.35	
13	Brittany Reimer	Canada	8:37.56	
14	Flavia Rigamonti	Switzerland	8:38.22	
15	Camelia Potec	Romania	8:38.78	
16	Yu Rui	China	8:39.30	
17	Tanya Hunks	Canada	8:39.48	
18	Stephanie Williams	Australia	8:39.68	
19	Kristel Köbrich	Chile	8:40.46	
20	Sachiko Yamada	Japan	8:49.45	
21	Ionela Cozma	Romania	8:50.17	
22	Andreina Pinto	Venezuela	8:54.98	
23	Monika Mocnik	Slovenia	8:56.84	
24	Nimitta Thaveesupsoonthorn	Thailand	8:59.02	
25	Quah Ting Wen	Singapore	9:00.17	
26	Lynette Lim	Singapore	9:00.27	
27	Maroua Mathlouthi	Tunisia	9:02.29	
28	Golda Marcus	El Salvador	9:03.16	
29	Carmen Nam	Hong Kong	9:04.11	
30	Ji Yeon Jung	South Korea	9:05.18	
31	Ji Eun Lee	South Korea	9:05.97	
32	Charlotte Johannsen	Denmark	9:09.80	
33	Sarah Hadj Aberrahmane	Algeria	9:16.62	
34	Maria Alejandra Torres	Peru	9:18.57	
35	Mona Simonsen	Faroe Islands	9:18.65	NR
36	Cai Lin Khoo	Malaysia	9:21.90	
37	Yanel Pinto	Venezuela	9:22.06	
38	Shrone Austin	Seychelles	9:27.84	
39	Simona Muccioli	San Marino	9:29.20	
40	Ranohon Amanova	Uzbekistan	9:30.52	
41	Fiorella Gomez-Sanchez	Peru	9:32.62	
42	Jutta Thomsen	Faroe Islands	9:32.79	
43	Valerie Eman	Aruba	9:43.04	
44	Marike Meyer	Namibia	9:47.48	
45	Hsu Jung He	Chinese Taipei	9:53.44	
46	Noufissa Chbihi	Morocco	9:56.05	
47	Hiba Bashouti	Jordan	10:03.84	
48	Sakina Ghulam	Pakistan	10:20.23	
49	Frances Nagatalevu	Fiji	10:56.40	
--	Gretta Ishaka	Burundi	DNS	
