= Swimming at the 2004 Summer Olympics – Women's 400 metre freestyle =

Women's 400 metre freestyle at the Games of the XXVIII Olympiad
- Venue: Athens Olympic Aquatic Centre
- Date: August 15, 2004 (heats & final)
- Competitors: 38 from 31 nations
- Winning time: 4:05.34 EU

Medalists
1st place, gold medalist(s)		Laure Manaudou	France
2nd place, silver medalist(s)		Otylia Jędrzejczak	Poland
3rd place, bronze medalist(s)		Kaitlin Sandeno	United States

The women's 400 metre freestyle event at the 2004 Olympic Games was contested at the Olympic Aquatic Centre of the Athens Olympic Sports Complex in Athens, Greece on August 15.

France's Laure Manaudou won the gold medal in this event, with a European record time of 4:05.34. The silver medal was awarded to Poland's Otylia Jędrzejczak, who finished behind Manaudou by half a second (0.50), in an outstanding time of 4:05.84. U.S. swimmer Kaitlin Sandeno, who earned a silver in the 400 m individual medley on the previous day, fought off a challenge from Romania's Camelia Potec in the final lap to take a bronze by two tenths of a second (0.20), clocking at 4:06.19.

== Records ==
Prior to this competition, the existing world and Olympic records were as follows.

World record	Janet Evans (USA)	4:03.85	Seoul, South Korea	22 September 1988
Olympic record	Janet Evans (USA)	4:03.85	Seoul, South Korea	22 September 1988

== Results ==
=== Heats ===
Rank	Heat	Lane	Name	Nationality	Time	Notes
1	5	3	Laure Manaudou	France	4:06.76	Q
2	4	5	Otylia Jędrzejczak	Poland	4:07.11	Q
3	3	4	Camelia Potec	Romania	4:07.39	Q
4	3	5	Ai Shibata	Japan	4:07.63	Q
5	4	1	Rebecca Cooke	Great Britain	4:08.18	Q
6	4	3	Kaitlin Sandeno	United States	4:08.22	Q
7	3	6	Linda Mackenzie	Australia	4:08.46	Q
8	5	5	Sachiko Yamada	Japan	4:09.10	Q
9	3	2	Claudia Poll	Costa Rica	4:09.75	
10	4	2	Kalyn Keller	United States	4:09.83	
11	5	7	Simona Păduraru	Romania	4:10.39	
12	5	4	Hannah Stockbauer	Germany	4:10.46	
13	5	6	Elka Graham	Australia	4:11.67	
14	5	1	Pang Jiaying	China	4:11.81	
15	4	4	Éva Risztov	Hungary	4:12.08	
16	5	2	Brittany Reimer	Canada	4:12.33	
17	4	6	Chen Hua	China	4:12.67	
18	4	7	Erika Villaécija	Spain	4:13.03	
19	5	8	Monique Ferreira	Brazil	4:13.75	
20	3	1	Zoi Dimoschaki	Greece	4:13.96	
21	3	3	Joanne Jackson	Great Britain	4:14.89	
22	2	6	Cecilia Biagioli	Argentina	4:16.42	
23	3	7	Arantxa Ramos	Spain	4:16.52	
24	2	3	Anja Čarman	Slovenia	4:17.79	
25	4	8	Daria Parshina	Russia	4:18.24	
26	2	7	Kristel Köbrich	Chile	4:18.68	
27	2	2	Vesna Stojanovska	Macedonia	4:19.39	
28	2	5	Janelle Atkinson	Jamaica	4:20.00	
29	1	6	Paola Duguet	Colombia	4:20.69	
30	3	8	Kristýna Kyněrová	Czech Republic	4:21.12	
31	2	1	Rebecca Linton	New Zealand	4:21.58	
32	2	8	Ha Eun-ju	South Korea	4:21.65	
33	1	4	Golda Marcus	El Salvador	4:22.27	
34	1	5	Pilin Tachakittiranan	Thailand	4:23.62	
35	1	7	Özlem Yasemin Taşkın	Turkey	4:24.08	
36	1	3	Ivanka Moralieva	Bulgaria	4:25.92	
37	1	2	Anita Galić	Croatia	4:26.09	
38	2	4	Olga Beresnyeva	Ukraine	4:26.30	

=== Final ===
Rank	Lane	Swimmer	Nation	Time	Notes
1st place, gold medalist(s)	4	Laure Manaudou	France	4:05.34	EU
2nd place, silver medalist(s)	5	Otylia Jędrzejczak	Poland	4:05.84	
3rd place, bronze medalist(s)	7	Kaitlin Sandeno	United States	4:06.19	
4	3	Camelia Potec	Romania	4:06.34	
5	6	Ai Shibata	Japan	4:07.51	
6	8	Sachiko Yamada	Japan	4:10.91	
7	1	Linda Mackenzie	Australia	4:10.92	
8	2	Rebecca Cooke	Great Britain	4:11.35	
