= Swimming at the 2007 World Aquatics Championships – Women's 400 metre freestyle =

The women's 400 metre freestyle at the 2007 World Aquatics Championships took place on 25 March (preliminaries and finals) at Rod Laver Arena in Melbourne, Australia.

The existing records at the start of the event were:

- World record (WR): 4:02.13, Laure Manaudou (France), 6 August 2006 in Budapest, Hungary
- Championship record (CR): 4:06.28, Tracey Wickham (Australia), at West Berlin 1978 (24 August 1978)

== Results ==
=== Final ===
Place	Lane	Name	Nationality	Splits (50m, 100m, 150m...350m)	Time	Notes
	4	Laure Manaudou	France	27.35 57.34 1:27.69 1:58.69; 2:29.73 3:01.10 3:32.36	4:02.61	CR
	7	Otylia Jędrzejczak	Poland	28.86 59.55 1:30.79 2:02.04; 2:32.77 3:03.53 3:34.28	4:04.23	NR
	3	Ai Shibata	Japan	28.54 59.15 1:30.38 2:01.58; 2:32.57 3:03.95 3:34.88	4:05.19	NR
4	8	Katie Hoff	USA	29.16 1:00.14 1:30.80 2:02.68; 2:33.35 3:04.33 3:35.20	4:05.65	
5	5	Federica Pellegrini	Italy	28.94 59.86 1:30.80 2:02.16; 2:33.04 3:04.46 3:35.38	4:05.79	
6	6	Kate Ziegler	USA	28.88 59.69 1:30.74 2:02.30; 2:33.44 3:05.04 3:36.63	4:06.99	
7	1	Joanne Jackson	(United Kingdom) Great Britain	28.39 59.36 1:30.35 2:02.08; 2:33.33 3:05.16 3:36.56	4:07.42	
8	2	Linda Mackenzie	Australia	28.36 59.39 1:30.66 2:02.27; 2:33.63 3:05.23 3:36.69	4:07.64	

=== Preliminary heats ===
Rank	Heat & Lane	Name	Nationality	Time	Note
1	H9 L4	Laure Manaudou	France	4:05.29	Q, CR
2	H9 L6	Federica Pellegrini	Italy	4:06.51	Q
3	H8 L5	Ai Shibata	Japan	4:07.17	Q
4	H8 L4	Kate Ziegler	United States	4:07.18	Q
5	H9 L5	Linda Mackenzie	Australia	4:07.26	Q
6	H7 L2	Otylia Jędrzejczak	Poland	4:08.16	Q
7	H9 L3	Joanne Jackson	Great Britain	4:08.17	Q
8	H7 L4	Katie Hoff	United States	4:08.38	Q
9	H7 L5	Caitlin McClatchey	Great Britain	4:08.52	
10	H8 L3	Bronte Barratt	Australia	4:08.99	
11	H9 L7	Sophie Huber	France	4:09.80	
12	H8 L7	Brittany Reimer	Canada	4:10.85	
13	H8 L2	Miao Tan	China	4:11.37	
14	H9 L2	Arantxa Ramos Plasencia	Spain	4:11.40	
15	H8 L6	Camelia Potec	Romania	4:11.83	
16	H8 L1	Flavia Rigamonti	Switzerland	4:11.85	
17	H9 L1	Helen Norfolk	New Zealand	4:11.98	
18	H7 L8	Lotte Friis	Denmark	4:12.99	
19	H7 L1	Wendy Trott	South Africa	4:13.92	
20	H7 L6	Yu Rui	China	4:13.94	
21	H8 L8	Tanya Hunks	Canada	4:14.68	
22	H7 L3	Sachiko Yamada	Japan	4:15.40	
23	H7 L7	Cecilia Elizabeth Biagioli	Argentina	4:16.71	
24	H6 L5	Agata Zwiejska	Poland	4:17.50	
25	H6 L6	Melissa Ingram	New Zealand	4:20.05	
26	H6 L8	Andreina Pinto	Venezuela	4:20.84	
27	H5 L4	Golda Marcus	El Salvador	4:22.17	
28	H5 L8	Ming Xiu Ong	Malaysia	4:22.43	
29	H6 L4	Chin Kuei Yang	Chinese Taipei	4:22.59	
30	H6 L1	Charlotte Johannsen	Denmark	4:22.76	
31	H6 L7	Tin Wen Quah	Singapore	4:23.57	
32	H6 L2	Carmen Nam	Hong Kong	4:24.07	
33	H5 L7	Nimitta Thaveesupsoonthorn	Thailand	4:24.38	
34	H5 L5	Maroua Mathlouthi	Tunisia	4:24.47	
35	H5 L6	Monika Mocnik	Slovenia	4:24.96	
36	H4 L5	Erica Totten	Philippines	4:25.13	
37	H4 L7	Kimberly Eeson	Zimbabwe	4:26.23	
38	H4 L4	Lynette Lim	Singapore	4:26.97	
39	H9 L8	Ji Eun Lee	South Korea	4:27.29	
40	H5 L3	Heysi Villarreal Navarro	Cuba	4:30.50	
41	H6 L3	Shrone Austin	Seychelles	4:30.56	
42	H4 L2	Maria Gandionco	Philippines	4:30.98	
43	H5 L1	Sarah Hadj Aberrahmane	Algeria	4:32.08	
44	H4 L8	Maria Alejandra Torres	Peru	4:32.85	
45	H4 L3	Raffaella Rodoni Palma	Chile	4:32.98	
46	H3 L7	Mona Simonsen	Faroe Islands	4:34.47	
47	H5 L2	Cai Lin Khoo	Malaysia	4:35.96	
48	H4 L1	Fiorella Gomez-Sanchez	Peru	4:36.04	
49	H3 L2	Jutta Thomsen	Faroe Islands	4:36.15	
50	H4 L6	Pin Chieh Nieh	Chinese Taipei	4:36.23	
51	H3 L6	Noufissa Chbihi	Morocco	4:37.84	
52	H3 L4	Matana Wellman	Zambia	4:38.06	
53	H2 L6	Ranohon Amanova	Uzbekistan	4:41.26	
54	H3 L3	Valerie Eman	Aruba	4:42.33	
55	H3 L5	Tuesday Watts	Grenada	4:43.79	
56	H3 L8	Marike Meyer	Namibia	4:44.24	
57	H2 L1	Shannon Austin	Seychelles	4:44.96	
58	H2 L5	Miriam Hatamleh	Jordan	4:47.43	
59	H3 L1	Pooja Raghava Alva	India	4:50.32	
60	H2 L3	Hiba Bashouti	Jordan	4:58.89	
61	H2 L7	Tojohanitra; Andiamanjatoprimamama	Madagascar	5:01.53	
62	H2 L4	Man Wai Fong	Macau	5:03.89	
63	H1 L4	Sarah Elizabeth Johnson	Northern Mariana Islands	5:05.03	
64	H2 L8	Sakina Ghulam	Pakistan	5:11.10	
65	H1 L5	Frances Nagatalevu	Fiji	5:27.81	
	H1 L3	Ogom Obianugba	Nigeria	DNS	
	H2 L2	Ngozi Monu	Nigeria	DNS	
