= Swimming at the 2000 Summer Olympics – Women's 800 metre freestyle =

Women's 800 metre freestyle at the Games of the XXVII Olympiad
- Venue: Sydney International Aquatic Centre
- Date: September 21, 2000 (heats); September 22, 2000 (final)
- Competitors: 28 from 22 nations
- Winning time: 8:19.67 OR

Medalists
1st place, gold medalist(s)		Brooke Bennett	United States
2nd place, silver medalist(s)		Yana Klochkova	Ukraine
3rd place, bronze medalist(s)		Kaitlin Sandeno	United States

The women's 800 metre freestyle event at the 2000 Summer Olympics took place on 21–22 September at the Sydney International Aquatic Centre in Sydney, Australia.

United States' teenager Brooke Bennett became the second swimmer in Olympic history to defend her title in the event, and the fifth to strike a long-distance freestyle double, since Debbie Meyer did so in 1968, Petra Thümer in 1976, Tiffany Cohen in 1984, and the legendary Janet Evans in 1988. She maintained a powerful lead from start to finish before hitting the wall first in 8:19.67, the second-fastest of all time, cutting off Evans' 12-year Olympic record by 0.53 seconds. After effortlessly striking a medley double over the past six days, Yana Klochkova added a silver to her medal tally at these Games, in a scintillating Ukrainian record of 8:22.66. Bennett's teammate Kaitlin Sandeno gave the Americans a further reason to celebrate, as she powered home with a bronze in 8:24.29.

Switzerland's Flavia Rigamonti lost a spirited challenge to Sandeno for the bronze by more than a full body length, but earned a fourth spot in a national record of 8:25.91. She was followed in fifth by Germany's Hannah Stockbauer (8:30.11), and in sixth by China's Chen Hua (8:30.58). Stockbauer's teammate Jana Henke (8:31.97), bronze medalist in Barcelona eight years earlier, and Japan's Sachiko Yamada (8:37.39) rounded out the finale.

== Records ==
Prior to this competition, the existing world and Olympic records were as follows.

World record	Janet Evans (USA)	8:16.22	Tokyo, Japan	20 August 1989
Olympic record	Janet Evans (USA)	8:20.20	Seoul, South Korea	24 September 1988

The following new world and Olympic records were set during this competition.

Date	Event	Name	Nationality	Time	Record
22 September	Final	Brooke Bennett	United States	8:19.67	OR

== Results ==
=== Heats ===
Rank	Heat	Lane	Name	Nationality	Time	Notes
1	4	4	Brooke Bennett	United States	8:26.47	Q
2	3	2	Yana Klochkova	Ukraine	8:29.84	Q, NR
3	3	4	Kaitlin Sandeno	United States	8:30.12	Q
4	2	4	Flavia Rigamonti	Switzerland	8:30.44	Q
5	4	5	Hannah Stockbauer	Germany	8:31.74	Q
6	3	5	Jana Henke	Germany	8:31.86	Q
7	4	3	Sachiko Yamada	Japan	8:33.06	Q
8	3	7	Chen Hua	China	8:33.23	Q
9	4	6	Janelle Atkinson	Jamaica	8:34.51	NR
10	3	3	Kirsten Vlieghuis	Netherlands	8:35.80	
11	2	5	Chantal Strasser	Switzerland	8:35.84	
12	4	2	Rachel Harris	Australia	8:36.94	
13	2	3	Hayley Lewis	Australia	8:38.75	
14	3	6	Éva Risztov	Hungary	8:43.07	
15	2	2	Rebecca Cooke	Great Britain	8:43.22	
16	2	7	Karine Legault	Canada	8:43.56	
17	3	1	Irina Ufimtseva	Russia	8:44.64	
18	4	8	Mirjana Boševska	Macedonia	8:46.39	NR
19	2	8	Hana Černá	Czech Republic	8:47.64	
20	1	3	Ivanka Moralieva	Bulgaria	8:52.61	
21	1	4	Patricia Villarreal	Mexico	8:54.79	
22	3	8	Marianna Lymperta	Greece	8:56.33	
23	2	6	Olga Beresnyeva	Ukraine	9:00.12	
24	1	5	Lin Chi-chan	Chinese Taipei	9:01.09	
25	2	1	Adi Bichman	Israel	9:01.90	
26	1	6	Cecilia Biagioli	Argentina	9:04.02	
	4	1	Claudia Poll	Costa Rica	DNS	
	4	7	Joanne Malar	Canada	DNS	

=== Final ===
Rank	Lane	Name	Nationality	Time	Notes
1st place, gold medalist(s)	4	Brooke Bennett	United States	8:19.67	OR
2nd place, silver medalist(s)	5	Yana Klochkova	Ukraine	8:22.66	NR
3rd place, bronze medalist(s)	3	Kaitlin Sandeno	United States	8:24.29	
4	6	Flavia Rigamonti	Switzerland	8:25.91	NR
5	2	Hannah Stockbauer	Germany	8:30.11	
6	8	Chen Hua	China	8:30.58	
7	7	Jana Henke	Germany	8:31.97	
8	1	Sachiko Yamada	Japan	8:37.39	
