= Swimming at the 2005 World Aquatics Championships – Women's 1500 metre freestyle =

Women's 1500m Freestyle at the 2005 FINA World Aquatics Championships
- Dates: 25 July (prelims); 26 July (final)
- Competitors: 24 from 19 nations
- Winning time: 16 minutes 00.41 seconds

Medalists
gold medal	Kate Ziegler	United States
silver medal	Flavia Rigamonti	Switzerland
bronze medal	Brittany Reimer	Canada

The Women's 1500 Freestyle event at the 11th FINA World Aquatics Championships was swum on 25 – 26 July 2005 in Montreal, Quebec, Canada. Preliminary heats were swum during the morning session on 25 July with the top-8 finishers advancing to swim again in the event's final heat during the evening session on 26 July.

At the start of the event, the existing World (WR) and Championships (CR) records were:

- WR: 15:52.10, Janet Evans (USA), swum 26 March 1988 in Orlando, USA;
- CR: 16:00.18, Hannah Stockbauer (Germany), swum 22 July 2003 in Barcelona, Spain

== Results ==
=== Preliminary heats ===
Rank	Heat + Lane	Swimmer	Nation	Time	Notes
1	H3 L2	Rebecca Cooke	Great Britain	16:15.69	q
2	H3 L7	Laura Conway	United States	16:17.97	q
3	H4 L3	Flavia Rigamonti	Switzerland	16:18.14	q
4	H3 L6	Brittany Reimer	Canada	16:21.55	q
5	H2 L5	Jana Henke	Germany	16:22.57	q
6	H2 L6	Yumi Kida	Japan	16:23.05	q
7	H4 L4	Kate Ziegler	United States	16:26.75	q
8	H2 L4	Erika Villaécija	Spain	16:29.54	q
9	H4 L7	Kristel Köbrich	Chile	16:33.36	
10	H4 L5	Sarah Paton	Australia	16:37.18	
11	H3 L3	Lotte Friis	Denmark	16:38.53	
12	H3 L4	Laure Manaudou	France	16:39.19	
13	H2 L3	Éva Risztov	Hungary	16:39.55	
14	H3 L5	Sachiko Yamada	Japan	16:48.23	
15	H4 L2	Elisa Pasini	Italy	16:48.91	
16	H4 L6	Réka Nagy	Hungary	16:54.94	
17	H3 L1	Cecilia Biagioli	Argentina	17:01.73	
18	H2 L7	Teresia Gimholt	Sweden	17:10.21	
19	H2 L1	Youn Jeong Seo	South Korea	17:14.31	
20	H1 L4	Shrone Austin	Seychelles	17:31.81	
21	H4 L8	Chin-Kuei Yang	Chinese Taipei	17:34.01	
22	H4 L1	Wan-Tong Cheng	Chinese Taipei	17:46.01	
23	H1 L3	QUAH Ting Wen	Singapore	18:07.10	
24	H1 L5	Wan Ting Goh	Singapore	18:16.20	

=== Final heat ===
Rank	Swimmer	Nation	Time	Notes
1st place, gold medalist(s)	Kate Ziegler	(United States) USA	16:00.41	
2nd place, silver medalist(s)	Flavia Rigamonti	Switzerland	16:04.34	
3rd place, bronze medalist(s)	Brittany Reimer	Canada	16:07.73	
4	Laura Conway	(United States) USA	16:17.17	
5	Jana Henke	Germany	16:17.89	
6	Erika Villaécija	Spain	16:17.92	
7	Rebecca Cooke	(United Kingdom) Great Britain	16:23.25	
8	Yumi Kida	Japan	16:23.89	
