= Swimming at the 2006 Commonwealth Games – Women's 800 metre freestyle =

== Women's 800 m Freestyle - Final ==
Pos.	Lane	Athlete	R.T.									Tbh.
	4	Rebecca Cooke (ENG)	0.86	50 m 29.82; 29.82	100 m 1:01.73; 31.91	150 m 1:34.08; 32.35	200 m 2:06.49; 32.41	250 m 2:38.67; 32.18	300 m 3:10.71; 32.04	350 m 3:42.58; 31.87	400 m 4:14.41; 31.83	
				450 m 4:46.21; 31.80	500 m 5:18.28; 32.07	550 m 5:50.16; 31.88	600 m 6:21.94; 31.78	650 m 6:53.95; 32.01	700 m 7:25.87; 31.92	750 m 7:58.01; 32.14	800 m 8:29.50; 31.49	
	3	Melissa Gorman (AUS)	0.86	50 m 29.85; 29.85	100 m 1:01.84; 31.99	150 m 1:34.02; 32.18	200 m 2:06.25; 32.23	250 m 2:38.51; 32.26	300 m 3:10.86; 32.35	350 m 3:42.96; 32.10	400 m 4:15.37; 32.41	
				450 m 4:47.54; 32.17	500 m 5:19.80; 32.26	550 m 5:51.81; 32.01	600 m 6:23.96; 32.15	650 m 6:56.06; 32.10	700 m 7:28.09; 32.03	750 m 7:59.96; 31.87	800 m 8:30.79; 30.83	1.29
	6	Brittany Reimer (CAN)	0.86	50 m 29.74; 29.74	100 m 1:01.73; 31.99	150 m 1:33.95; 32.22	200 m 2:06.41; 32.46	250 m 2:38.91; 32.50	300 m 3:11.48; 32.57	350 m 3:43.97; 32.49	400 m 4:16.90; 32.93	
				450 m 4:49.30; 32.40	500 m 5:22.14; 32.84	550 m 5:54.93; 32.79	600 m 6:27.91; 32.98	650 m 7:00.60; 32.69	700 m 7:33.71; 33.11	750 m 8:06.33; 32.62	800 m 8:38.05; 31.72	8.55
4	7	Keri-Anne Payne (ENG)	0.68	50 m 29.28; 29.28	100 m 1:01.25; 31.97	150 m 1:33.50; 32.25	200 m 2:05.92; 32.42	250 m 2:38.59; 32.67	300 m 3:11.33; 32.74	350 m 3:43.89; 32.56	400 m 4:16.77; 32.88	
				450 m 4:49.41; 32.64	500 m 5:22.30; 32.89	550 m 5:55.26; 32.96	600 m 6:28.25; 32.99	650 m 7:01.09; 32.84	700 m 7:33.96; 32.87	750 m 8:06.64; 32.68	800 m 8:38.24; 31.60	8.74
5	5	Wendy Trott (RSA)	0.81	50 m 29.73; 29.73	100 m 1:01.90; 32.17	150 m 1:34.39; 32.49	200 m 2:07.17; 32.78	250 m 2:40.01; 32.84	300 m 3:12.90; 32.89	350 m 3:45.84; 32.94	400 m 4:18.86; 33.02	
				450 m 4:51.42; 32.56	500 m 5:24.14; 32.72	550 m 5:57.13; 32.99	600 m 6:30.07; 32.94	650 m 7:02.78; 32.71	700 m 7:35.69; 32.91	750 m 8:08.54; 32.85	800 m 8:39.18; 30.64	9.68
6	2	Sarah Paton (AUS)	0.77	50 m 30.42; 30.42	100 m 1:02.62; 32.20	150 m 1:35.22; 32.60	200 m 2:07.92; 32.70	250 m 2:40.83; 32.91	300 m 3:13.68; 32.85	350 m 3:46.90; 33.22	400 m 4:20.40; 33.50	
				450 m 4:53.45; 33.05	500 m 5:26.82; 33.37	550 m 5:59.98; 33.16	600 m 6:33.33; 33.35	650 m 7:06.62; 33.29	700 m 7:39.74; 33.12	750 m 8:13.03; 33.29	800 m 8:45.35; 32.32	15.85
7	1	Caroline South (AUS)	0.73	50 m 31.14; 31.14	100 m 1:04.32; 33.18	150 m 1:37.46; 33.14	200 m 2:10.95; 33.49	250 m 2:44.27; 33.32	300 m 3:17.52; 33.25	350 m 3:50.59; 33.07	400 m 4:23.66; 33.07	
				450 m 4:56.52; 32.86	500 m 5:29.45; 32.93	550 m 6:02.29; 32.84	600 m 6:35.25; 32.96	650 m 7:08.13; 32.88	700 m 7:41.27; 33.14	750 m 8:14.13; 32.86	800 m 8:46.30; 32.17	16.80
8	8	Jazmin Carlin (WAL)	0.76	50 m 30.00; 30.00	100 m 1:02.26; 32.26	150 m 1:34.77; 32.51	200 m 2:07.46; 32.69	250 m 2:40.41; 32.95	300 m 3:13.39; 32.98	350 m 3:46.73; 33.34	400 m 4:20.12; 33.39	
				450 m 4:53.60; 33.48	500 m 5:27.36; 33.76	550 m 6:01.03; 33.67	600 m 6:35.12; 34.09	650 m 7:08.81; 33.69	700 m 7:42.91; 34.10	750 m 8:16.63; 33.72	800 m 8:49.70; 33.07	20.20

== Women's 800 m Freestyle - Heats ==
=== Women's 800 m Freestyle - Heat 01 ===
Pos.	Lane	Athlete	R.T.									Tbh.
1	2	Wendy Trott (RSA)	0.81	50 m 30.01; 30.01	100 m 1:02.51; 32.50	150 m 1:35.39; 32.88	200 m 2:08.29; 32.90	250 m 2:41.06; 32.77	300 m 3:13.86; 32.80	350 m 3:46.83; 32.97	400 m 4:19.66; 32.83	
				450 m 4:51.98; 32.32	500 m 5:24.53; 32.55	550 m 5:57.13; 32.60	600 m 6:30.02; 32.89	650 m 7:02.85; 32.83	700 m 7:35.79; 32.94	750 m 8:08.38; 32.59	800 m 8:39.21; 30.83	
2	4	Melissa Gorman (AUS)	0.85	50 m 30.15; 30.15	100 m 1:02.43; 32.28	150 m 1:35.27; 32.84	200 m 2:08.12; 32.85	250 m 2:40.93; 32.81	300 m 3:13.85; 32.92	350 m 3:46.54; 32.69	400 m 4:19.72; 33.18	
				450 m 4:52.46; 32.74	500 m 5:25.07; 32.61	550 m 5:57.59; 32.52	600 m 6:30.35; 32.76	650 m 7:03.04; 32.69	700 m 7:35.81; 32.77	750 m 8:08.27; 32.46	800 m 8:39.28; 31.01	0.07
3	3	Brittany Reimer (CAN)	0.84	50 m 30.37; 30.37	100 m 1:02.70; 32.33	150 m 1:35.33; 32.63	200 m 2:08.18; 32.85	250 m 2:41.02; 32.84	300 m 3:14.02; 33.00	350 m 3:46.77; 32.75	400 m 4:19.87; 33.10	
				450 m 4:52.63; 32.76	500 m 5:25.40; 32.77	550 m 5:58.09; 32.69	600 m 6:31.18; 33.09	650 m 7:04.31; 33.13	700 m 7:37.04; 32.73	750 m 8:09.59; 32.55	800 m 8:40.98; 31.39	1.77
4	5	Keri-Anne Payne (ENG)	0.69	50 m 30.51; 30.51	100 m 1:03.67; 33.16	150 m 1:36.20; 32.53	200 m 2:09.36; 33.16	250 m 2:42.05; 32.69	300 m 3:15.05; 33.00	350 m 3:48.25; 33.20	400 m 4:21.48; 33.23	
				450 m 4:54.32; 32.84	500 m 5:27.65; 33.33	550 m 6:00.80; 33.15	600 m 6:34.13; 33.33	650 m 7:07.41; 33.28	700 m 7:40.98; 33.57	750 m 8:14.47; 33.49	800 m 8:47.62; 33.15	8.41
5	6	Jazmin Carlin (WAL)	0.78	50 m 30.76; 30.76	100 m 1:03.79; 33.03	150 m 1:36.47; 32.68	200 m 2:09.41; 32.94	250 m 2:42.46; 33.05	300 m 3:15.78; 33.32	350 m 3:49.41; 33.63	400 m 4:23.19; 33.78	
				450 m 4:56.62; 33.43	500 m 5:30.67; 34.05	550 m 6:04.71; 34.04	600 m 6:39.31; 34.60	650 m 7:13.69; 34.38	700 m 7:48.37; 34.68	750 m 8:22.83; 34.46	800 m 8:55.88; 33.05	16.67
6	7	Natalie du Toit (RSA)	0.88	50 m 31.03; 31.03	100 m 1:04.29; 33.26	150 m 1:37.94; 33.65	200 m 2:11.88; 33.94	250 m 2:45.78; 33.90	300 m 3:19.96; 34.18	350 m 3:54.21; 34.25	400 m 4:28.71; 34.50	
				450 m 5:03.10; 34.39	500 m 5:37.75; 34.65	550 m 6:12.28; 34.53	600 m 6:47.12; 34.84	650 m 7:21.89; 34.77	700 m 7:56.89; 35.00	750 m 8:31.79; 34.90	800 m 9:06.12; 34.33	26.91
7	1	Olivia Rawlinson (IOM)	0.84	50 m 32.21; 32.21	100 m 1:07.77; 35.56	150 m 1:43.44; 35.67	200 m 2:19.77; 36.33	250 m 2:56.56; 36.79	300 m 3:33.55; 36.99	350 m 4:10.93; 37.38	400 m 4:48.41; 37.48	
				450 m 5:25.65; 37.24	500 m 6:02.67; 37.02	550 m 6:39.79; 37.12	600 m 7:16.64; 36.85	650 m 7:53.80; 37.16	700 m 8:30.61; 36.81	750 m 9:06.73; 36.12	800 m 9:41.59; 34.86	1:02.38

=== Women's 800 m Freestyle - Heat 02 ===
Pos.	Lane	Athlete	R.T.									Tbh.
1	4	Rebecca Cooke (ENG)	0.84	50 m 30.16; 30.16	100 m 1:02.29; 32.13	150 m 1:34.47; 32.18	200 m 2:06.85; 32.38	250 m 2:39.13; 32.28	300 m 3:11.40; 32.27	350 m 3:43.92; 32.52	400 m 4:16.49; 32.57	
				450 m 4:48.97; 32.48	500 m 5:21.55; 32.58	550 m 5:54.29; 32.74	600 m 6:27.16; 32.87	650 m 7:00.24; 33.08	700 m 7:33.28; 33.04	750 m 8:06.08; 32.80	800 m 8:38.18; 32.10	
2	5	Sarah Paton (AUS)	0.77	50 m 30.48; 30.48	100 m 1:02.78; 32.30	150 m 1:35.14; 32.36	200 m 2:07.83; 32.69	250 m 2:40.60; 32.77	300 m 3:13.42; 32.82	350 m 3:46.36; 32.94	400 m 4:19.21; 32.85	
				450 m 4:52.05; 32.84	500 m 5:25.16; 33.11	550 m 5:58.26; 33.10	600 m 6:31.62; 33.36	650 m 7:04.83; 33.21	700 m 7:38.43; 33.60	750 m 8:11.79; 33.36	800 m 8:44.12; 32.33	5.94
3	6	Caroline South (AUS)	0.80	50 m 30.64; 30.64	100 m 1:03.30; 32.66	150 m 1:36.19; 32.89	200 m 2:09.11; 32.92	250 m 2:41.93; 32.82	300 m 3:14.85; 32.92	350 m 3:47.71; 32.86	400 m 4:20.74; 33.03	
				450 m 4:53.73; 32.99	500 m 5:27.02; 33.29	550 m 6:00.35; 33.33	600 m 6:33.99; 33.64	650 m 7:08.08; 34.09	700 m 7:42.38; 34.30	750 m 8:17.10; 34.72	800 m 8:51.12; 34.02	12.94
4	7	Ting Wen Quah (SIN)	0.73	50 m 30.83; 30.83	100 m 1:04.20; 33.37	150 m 1:38.07; 33.87	200 m 2:12.19; 34.12	250 m 2:46.50; 34.31	300 m 3:21.28; 34.78	350 m 3:55.95; 34.67	400 m 4:30.87; 34.92	
				450 m 5:05.38; 34.51	500 m 5:40.17; 34.79	550 m 6:15.01; 34.84	600 m 6:49.85; 34.84	650 m 7:24.58; 34.73	700 m 7:59.69; 35.11	750 m 8:34.52; 34.83	800 m 9:07.93; 33.41	29.75
5	8	Ming Xiu Ong (MAS)	0.72	50 m 31.40; 31.40	100 m 1:05.17; 33.77	150 m 1:39.40; 34.23	200 m 2:14.52; 35.12	250 m 2:49.37; 34.85	300 m 3:24.19; 34.82	350 m 3:58.58; 34.39	400 m 4:32.90; 34.32	
				450 m 5:07.50; 34.60	500 m 5:42.16; 34.66	550 m 6:16.67; 34.51	600 m 6:51.44; 34.77	650 m 7:25.72; 34.28	700 m 8:00.75; 35.03	750 m 8:35.48; 34.73	800 m 9:09.11; 33.63	30.93
6	1	Shrone Austin (SEY)	0.86	50 m 31.94; 31.94	100 m 1:06.17; 34.23	150 m 1:40.92; 34.75	200 m 2:15.65; 34.73	250 m 2:50.87; 35.22	300 m 3:26.09; 35.22	350 m 4:01.32; 35.23	400 m 4:36.45; 35.13	
				450 m 5:12.08; 35.63	500 m 5:47.20; 35.12	550 m 6:22.78; 35.58	600 m 6:58.25; 35.47	650 m 7:33.91; 35.66	700 m 8:09.22; 35.31	750 m 8:44.38; 35.16	800 m 9:17.96; 33.58	39.78
DNS	2	Melissa Corfe (RSA)										
DNS	3	Caitlin McClatchey (SCO)										
