= 2002 Pan Pacific Swimming Championships – Women's 400 metre freestyle =

Women's 400 metre freestyle at the 2002 Pan Pacific Swimming Championships
- Venue: Yokohama International Swimming Pool
- Dates: 25 August 2002 (heats & finals)
- Competitors: 23 from 8 nations
- Winning time: 4:09.50

Medalists
gold medal	Diana Munz	United States
silver medal	Lindsay Benko	United States
bronze medal	Sachiko Yamada	Japan

The women's 400 metre freestyle competition at the 2002 Pan Pacific Swimming Championships took place on 25 August at the Yokohama International Swimming Pool. The last champion was Brooke Bennett of US.

This race consisted of eight lengths of the pool, with all eight being in the freestyle stroke.

== Records ==
Prior to this competition, the existing world and Pan Pacific records were as follows:

World record	Janet Evans (USA)	4:03.85	Seoul, South Korea	22 September 1988
Pan Pacific Championships record	Janet Evans (USA)	4:04.53	Tokyo, Japan	19 August 1989

== Results ==
All times are in minutes and seconds.

KEY:	q	Fastest non-qualifiers	Q	Qualified	CR	Championships record	NR	National record	PB	Personal best	SB	Seasonal best

=== Heats ===
The first round was held on 25 August.

Rank	Heat	Lane	Name	Nationality	Time	Notes
1	3	4	Diana Munz	United States	4:10.30	Q
2	2	4	Lindsay Benko	United States	4:10.49	Q
3	2	5	Sachiko Yamada	Japan	4:12.24	Q
4	4	3	Hayley Peirsol	United States	4:12.44	Q
5	3	5	Elka Graham	Australia	4:13.99	Q
6	4	2	Monique Ferreira	Brazil	4:14.82	Q
7	3	3	Amanda Pascoe	Australia	4:14.89	Q
8	2	6	Ai Shibata	Japan	4:15.18	Q
9	4	5	Mary Hill	United States	4:15.87	
10	2	3	Jessica Deglau	Canada	4:15.97	
11	2	1	Mariana Brochado	Brazil	4:16.91	
12	4	4	Pang Jiaying	China	4:17.43	
13	4	6	Claire Hentzen	United States	4:18.43	
14	2	2	Norie Urabe	Japan	4:19.71	
15	3	6	Madoka Ochi	Japan	4:20.84	
16	1	4	Denise Oliveira	Brazil	4:22.44	
17	3	7	Taryn Lencoe	Canada	4:22.62	
18	2	7	Heidi Crawford	Australia	4:24.02	
19	4	1	Rebecca Linton	New Zealand	4:25.57	
20	1	5	Nathalie Bernard	New Zealand	4:26.04	
21	3	1	Melissa Ingram	New Zealand	4:28.05	
22	4	8	Sarah Jackson	New Zealand	4:31.76	
23	1	3	U Nice Chan	Singapore	4:36.51	
–	3	2	Elizabeth Van Welie	New Zealand	DNS	
–	4	7	Kelly Doody	Canada	DNS	

=== Final ===
The final was held on 25 August.

Rank	Lane	Name	Nationality	Time	Notes
1st place, gold medalist(s)	4	Diana Munz	United States	4:09.50	
2nd place, silver medalist(s)	5	Lindsay Benko	United States	4:10.28	
3rd place, bronze medalist(s)	3	Sachiko Yamada	Japan	4:10.79	
4	6	Elka Graham	Australia	4:12.42	
5	7	Amanda Pascoe	Australia	4:13.33	
6	1	Ai Shibata	Japan	4:13.34	
7	2	Monique Ferreira	Brazil	4:13.48	
8	8	Jessica Deglau	Canada	4:19.36	
