= 2002 Pan Pacific Swimming Championships – Women's 800 metre freestyle =

Women's 800 metre freestyle at the 2002 Pan Pacific Swimming Championships
- Venue: Yokohama International Swimming Pool
- Dates: August 28, 2002 (heats & finals)
- Competitors: 14 from 6 nations
- Winning time: 8:30.45

Medalists
gold medal	Diana Munz	United States
silver medal	Sachiko Yamada	Japan
bronze medal	Hayley Peirsol	United States

The women's 800 metre freestyle competition at the 2002 Pan Pacific Swimming Championships took place on August 28 at the Yokohama International Swimming Pool. The last champion was Brooke Bennett of US.

This event was a timed-final where each swimmer swam just once.

== Records ==
Prior to this competition, the existing world and Pan Pacific records were as follows:

World record	Janet Evans (USA)	8:16.22	Tokyo, Japan	August 20, 1989
Pan Pacific Championships record	Janet Evans (USA)	8:16.22	Tokyo, Japan	August 20, 1989

== Results ==
All times are in minutes and seconds.

KEY:	q	Fastest non-qualifiers	Q	Qualified	CR	Championships record	NR	National record	PB	Personal best	SB	Seasonal best

Rank	Heat	Lane	Name	Nationality	Time	Notes
1st place, gold medalist(s)	2	4	Diana Munz	United States	8:30.45	
2nd place, silver medalist(s)	2	3	Sachiko Yamada	Japan	8:31.89	
3rd place, bronze medalist(s)	2	5	Hayley Peirsol	United States	8:32.27	
4	1	5	Ai Shibata	Japan	8:38.30	
5	2	6	Amanda Pascoe	Australia	8:39.89	
6	2	1	Nayara Ribeiro	Brazil	8:43.53	
7	2	7	Jennifer Reilly	Australia	8:44.92	
8	2	8	Taryn Lencoe	Canada	8:51.00	
9	1	4	Claire Hentzen	United States	8:44.84	
10	1	6	Sawami Fujita	Japan	8:53.25	
11	2	2	Madoka Ochi	Japan	8:59.44	
12	1	2	Rebecca Linton	New Zealand	9:04.35	
13	1	3	Ayane Sato	Japan	9:09.65	
14	1	7	Bárbara Jatobá	Brazil	9:16.49	
