= Ivanka Moralieva =

Bulgarian swimmer (born 1983)

Personal information
- Full name: Ivanka Moralieva
- National team: Bulgaria
- Born: 15 October 1983 (age 42) Smolyan, Bulgaria
- Height: 1.66 m (5 ft 5 in)
- Weight: 62 kg (137 lb)

Sport
- Sport: Swimming
- Strokes: Freestyle, open water
- Club: Levski Sofia
Medal record
Women's swimming
Representing Bulgaria
European Championships
| Bronze medal – third place | 2004 Madrid | 25 km open water |

Ivanka Moralieva (Bulgarian: Иванка Моралиева; born 15 October 1983) is a Bulgarian former swimmer, who specialized in long-distance freestyle events and open water marathon. Since 2001, she holds a Bulgarian record in the 1500 m freestyle from the World Championships in Fukuoka, Japan (16:55.53). She also won a bronze medal in the 25 km, as an open water swimmer, at the 2004 European Aquatics Championships in Madrid, Spain (4:41:21.2).

Moralieva made her first Bulgarian team, as a 17-year-old, at the 2000 Summer Olympics in Sydney. There, she failed to advance to the succeeding round in any of her individual events, finishing thirty-fourth in the 200 m freestyle (2:07.61), thirtieth in the 400 m freestyle (4:19.10), and twentieth in the 800 m freestyle (8:52.61).

At the 2004 Summer Olympics in Athens, Moralieva qualified only for two swimming events with five days in between. She posted FINA B-standard entry times of 4:22.41 (400 m freestyle) and 8:55.15 (800 m freestyle) from the European Championships. On the second day of the Games, Moralieva placed thirty-sixth overall in the 400 m freestyle. Swimming in heat one, she saved a fifth spot over Croatia's Anita Galić, who finished behind her in last place by 0.17 of a second, with a time of 4:25.92. In her second event, 800 m freestyle, Moralieva challenged seven other swimmers on the second heat, including Germany's Jana Henke, who won a bronze in Barcelona twelve years before (1992). She rounded out a field to last place by a 5.17-second margin behind Ukraine's Olga Beresnyeva in 9:03.13. Moralieva failed to reach the top 8 final, as she placed twenty-sixth overall from the morning's preliminaries.
