= Manaudou =

Manaudou is a French surname. Notable people with the surname include:

- Florent Manaudou (born 1990), French swimmer
- Laure Manaudou (born 1986), French swimmer
- Nicolas Manaudou (born 1985), French swimming coach
