= Swimming at the 2002 Commonwealth Games – Women's 400 metre freestyle =

Women's 400 metres freestyle at the 2002 Commonwealth Games
- Venue: Manchester Aquatics Centre
- Dates: 3 August 2002
- Competitors: 14 from 8 nations
- Winning time: 4:09.49

Medalists
| gold medal | Rebecca Cooke | England |
| silver medal | Elka Graham | Australia |
| bronze medal | Janelle Atkinson | Jamaica |

The Women's 400 metre freestyle event at the 2002 Commonwealth Games was held on 3 August at the Manchester Aquatics Centre.

== Records ==
Prior to this competition, the existing records were as follows;

| World record | Janet Evans (USA) | 4:03.85 | Seoul, Korea | 22 September 1988 |
| Commonwealth record | | | | |
| Games record | Sarah Hardcastle (ENG) | 4:07.68 | Edinburgh, Scotland | 27 July 1986 |

== Results ==
=== Heats ===
The 8 fastest swimmers in the heats qualified for the semifinals.

| Rank | Heat | Lane | Name | Nationality | Time | Notes |
|---|---|---|---|---|---|---|
| 1 | 1 | 4 | Rebecca Cooke | England | 4:13.19 | Q |
| 2 | 1 | 5 | Jessica Deglau | Canada | 4:14.24 | Q |
| 3 | 2 | 4 | Elka Graham | Australia | 4:15.14 | Q |
| 4 | 2 | 5 | Amanda Pascoe | Australia | 4:15.30 | Q |
| 5 | 2 | 3 | Janelle Atkinson | Jamaica | 4:16.91 | Q |
| 6 | 1 | 3 | Karen Nisbet | Scotland | 4:19.22 | Q |
| 7 | 2 | 6 | Caroline Saxby | England | 4:19.56 | Q |
| 8 | 1 | 6 | Sophie Simard | Canada | 4:21.82 | Q |
| 9 | 2 | 2 | Danielle Bell | Canada | 4:22.06 | |
| 10 | 1 | 2 | Bethan Francis Coole | Wales | 4:25.39 | |
| 11 | 2 | 7 | Dawn Jason | Wales | 4:30.33 | |
| 12 | 1 | 7 | Holly James | Wales | 4:32.65 | |
| 13 | 2 | 1 | Christel Bouvron | Singapore | 4:38.12 | |
| 14 | 2 | 8 | Roberta Callus | Malta | 4:40.09 | |

=== Final ===
The final was held on 3 August at 20:10.

| Rank | Lane | Name | Nationality | Time | Notes |
|---|---|---|---|---|---|
| 1st place, gold medalist(s) | 4 | Rebecca Cooke | England | 4:09.49 | |
| 2nd place, silver medalist(s) | 3 | Elka Graham | Australia | 4:11.47 | |
| 3rd place, bronze medalist(s) | 2 | Janelle Atkinson | Jamaica | 4:13.24 | |
| 4 | 5 | Jessica Deglau | Canada | 4:14.00 | |
| 5 | 6 | Amanda Pascoe | Australia | 4:14.74 | |
| 6 | 7 | Karen Nisbet | Scotland | 4:16.76 | |
| 7 | 1 | Caroline Saxby | England | 4:18.90 | |
| 8 | 8 | Sophie Simard | Canada | 4:19.55 | |
