= Patricia Villarreal =

Mexican swimmer

Personal information
- Full name: Patricia Villarreal Vargas
- National team: Mexico
- Born: 5 June 1983 (age 43) Torreón, Mexico
- Height: 1.69 m (5 ft 7 in)
- Weight: 58 kg (128 lb)

Sport
- Sport: Swimming
- Strokes: Freestyle
- Club: Bolles School Sharks (U.S.)
- Coach: Larry Shofe (U.S.)

Patricia Villarreal Vargas (born June 5, 1983) is a Mexican former swimmer, who specialized in long-distance freestyle events. She represented Mexico, as a 17-year-old, at the 2000 Summer Olympics, and also became a member of Sharks Swim Club at the Bolles School in Jacksonville, Florida under her personal coach Larry Shofe.

Villarreal swam only in a long-distance freestyle double at the 2000 Summer Olympics in Sydney. She achieved FINA B-standards of 4:22.27 (400 m freestyle) and 8:52.04 (800 m freestyle) from the Mexican Youth Olympic Festival in Hermosillo. On the second day of the Games, Villarreal placed thirty-third in the 400 m freestyle. Swimming in heat one, she came up with a fantastic swim on the final lap to pick up a third seed in 4:21.03, sufficiently enough for her lifetime best. Five days later, in the 800 m freestyle, Villarreal participated in heat one against three other swimmers Ivanka Moralieva of Bulgaria, Lin Chi-chan of Chinese Taipei, and Cecilia Biagioli of Argentina. Starting from last on an early length, she held off a challenge from Lin to grab a second seed and twenty-first overall in 8:54.79, two seconds below her entry standard.
