= Swimming at the 2002 Commonwealth Games – Women's 800 metre freestyle =

Women's 800 metre freestyle at the 2002 Commonwealth Games
- Venue: Manchester Aquatics Centre
- Dates: 1 August (heats); 2 August (final)
- Competitors: 10 from 7 nations
- Winning time: 8:28.54

Medalists
gold medal	Rebecca Cooke	England
silver medal	Amanda Pascoe	Australia
bronze medal	Janelle Atkinson	Jamaica

The women's 800 metre freestyle event at the 2002 Commonwealth Games as part of the swimming programme took place on 1 and 2 August at the Manchester Aquatics Centre in Manchester, England.

== Records ==
Prior to this competition, the existing world and games records were as follows.

World record	(United States) Janet Evans	8:16.22	Tokyo, Japan	20 August 1989
Games record	(Australia) Tracey Wickham	8:24.62	Edmonton, Canada	5 August 1978

== Schedule ==
The schedule was as follows:

All times are local time

Date	Time	Round
Thursday 1 August	10:00	Heats
Friday 2 August	20:33	Final

== Results ==
=== Heats ===
Rank	Heat	Lane	Name	Nationality	Time	Notes
1	2	4	Rebecca Cooke	England	8:33.31	Q
2	1	4	Amanda Pascoe	Australia	8:40.88	Q
3	1	3	Janelle Atkinson	Jamaica	8:41.91	Q
4	2	5	Jennifer Reilly	Australia	8:43.77	Q
5	1	5	Nathalie Brown	England	8:46.51	Q
6	2	3	Caroline Saxby	England	8:53.51	Q
7	2	6	Danielle Bell	Canada	8:54.11	Q
8	2	2	Natalie du Toit	South Africa	9:12.14	Q
9	1	6	Dawn Jason	Wales	9:12.71	
10	2	7	Roberta Callus	Malta	9:38.16	

== Final ==
=== Final ===
Rank	Lane	Name	Nationality	Time	Notes
1st place, gold medalist(s)	4	Rebecca Cooke	England	8:28.54	
2nd place, silver medalist(s)	5	Amanda Pascoe	Australia	8:34.19	
3rd place, bronze medalist(s)	3	Janelle Atkinson	Jamaica	8:36.23	
4	6	Jennifer Reilly	Australia	8:41.79	
5	2	Nathalie Brown	England	8:41.81	
6	7	Caroline Saxby	England	8:44.85	
7	1	Danielle Bell	Canada	8:55.34	
8	8	Natalie du Toit	South Africa	9:13.57	
