= Özlem Yasemin Taşkın =

Turkish swimmer (born 1985)

Personal information
- Full name: Özlem Yasemin Taşkın
- National team: Turkey
- Born: 28 October 1985 (age 40) Istanbul, Turkey
- Height: 1.73 m (5 ft 8 in)
- Weight: 64 kg (141 lb)

Sport
- Sport: Swimming
- Strokes: Freestyle
- Club: Galatasaray Spor Kulübü
- Coach: Yılmaz Özüak

Özlem Yasemin Taşkın (born 28 October 1985) is a Turkish former swimmer, who specialized in long-distance freestyle events. She is a five-time Turkish champion in the 200 and 400 m freestyle, and a member of Galatasaray Swimming Team, under her coach Yılmaz Özüak.

Taskin qualified for the women's 400 m freestyle at the 2004 Summer Olympics in Athens. She eclipsed a FINA B-standard entry time of 4:23.69 from the Turkish Open Championships in İzmir. She challenged five other swimmers in the first heat, including two-time Olympians Pilin Tachakittiranan of Thailand and Ivanka Moralieva of Bulgaria. She raced to fourth place by 0.46 of a second behind Tachakittiranan in 4:24.08. Parshina failed to reach into the top 8 final, as she placed thirty-fifth overall in the preliminaries.
