= Amanda Pascoe =

Australian freestyle swimmer (born 1984)

Personal information
- Full name: Amanda Pascoe
- Nationality: Australian
- Born: 31 October 1984 (age 41)
- Height: 1.75 m (5 ft 9 in)
- Weight: 60 kg (132 lb)

Sport
- Sport: Swimming
- Strokes: freestyle
Medal record
World Championships (SC)
Bronze medal – third place	2002 Moscow	4×200 m freestyle
Commonwealth Games
Silver medal – second place	2002 Manchester	800 m freestyle
Oceania Championships
Gold medal – first place	2000 Christchurch	400 m freestyle
Gold medal – first place	2000 Christchurch	4×200 m freestyle
Silver medal – second place	2000 Christchurch	4×100 m freestyle
Bronze medal – third place	2000 Christchurch	200 m freestyle
Bronze medal – third place	2000 Christchurch	800 m freestyle
- Updated on 17 January 2014

Amanda Pascoe (born 31 October 1984) is an Australian freestyle swimmer. She attended Westfields Sports High School, located in Fairfield West.

== Career ==
Pascoe first competed for Australia at the 2000 Oceania Swimming Championships in Christchurch where she won gold in the 400-metre freestyle in 4:20.46 and with Heidi Crawford, Tammie Smith and Joy Symons won gold in the 4 × 200-metre freestyle relay in 8:24.69. In both events new championships record times were set. Pascoe also won silver in 4 × 100-metre freestyle relay with Crawford, Brooke Townsend and Carmen Cosgrove in 3:55.46, and won bronze in the 200-metre freestyle in 2:04.89 and bronze 800-metre freestyle in 8:56.83.

At the 2001 World Championships in Fukuoka, Japan, Pascoe finished 4th in the 1500 metre freestyle in 16:16.80 and 12th in the 800-metre freestyle in 8:43.79.

At the 2001–02 FINA Swimming World Cup event in Melbourne, Pascoe won the 800-metre freestyle in 8:21.27, finished 5th in the 400-metre freestyle in 4:05.28 and 12th in the 200-metre freestyle in 2:02.13. At the event in Paris, Pascoe won the 800-metre freestyle in 8:19.54 and was runner up in the 400-metre freestyle in 4:07.13. In Stockholm, Pascoe won the 800-metre freestyle in 8:23.99, finished 3rd in the 400-metre freestyle in 4:08.70 and 14th in the 200-metre freestyle in 2:03.23. At the final event in Berlin, Pascoe won the 800-metre freestyle for the fourth time in 8:17.64, finished runner up in 400-metre freestyle in 4:05.42 and 21st in 200-metre freestyle in 2:02.35.

At the 2002 FINA World Swimming Championships (25 m) in Moscow, Pascoe with Giaan Rooney, Clementine Stoney and Lori Munz finished 4th in the heats of the 4 × 200-metre freestyle relay. In the final, Pascoe and Stoney were replaced with Elka Graham and Petria Thomas who won bronze with a time of 7:49.50. In other results, Pascoe finished 6th both the 400 and the 800-metre freestyle events with times of 4:08.68 and 8:29.98 respectively.

At the 2002 Commonwealth Games in Manchester, Pascoe won silver in the 800-metre freestyle in 8:34.19 and finished 5th in the 400-metre freestyle in 4:14.74.

At the 2002 Pan Pacific Swimming Championships in Yokohama, Japan, Pascoe finished 5th in the 400-metre freestyle in 4:13.33, 6th in the 800-metre freestyle in 8:39.89 and 7th in the 1500 metre freestyle in 16:46.84.

At the 2003 Duel in the Pool between United States and Australia in Indianapolis, Pascoe finished 3rd in the 800-metre freestyle in 8:37.52.

At the 2003 World Championships in Barcelona, Pascoe finished 14th in the 800-metre freestyle in 16:38.70 and 15th in the 800-metre freestyle in 8:42.27.
