= Kalyn Keller =

American swimmer (born 1985)

Personal information
- National team: United States
- Born: April 3, 1985 (age 41) Phoenix, Arizona, U.S.
- Occupations: Sports Announcer; Athletic Trainer
- Height: 5 ft 10 in (1.78 m)
- Weight: 159 lb (72 kg)
- Spouse: Keenan Robinson (2012)
- Relatives: Klete Keller, Olympian

Sport
- Sport: Swimming
- Events: Freestyle distance Freestyle relays Open Water 10, 25km
- Strokes: Freestyle
- Club: Phoenix Swim Club; Club Wolverine (2006-2007)
- College team: University of Southern California
- Coach: Mark Schubert (USC); Jon Urbanchek (Club Wolverine)
Medal record
Women's swimming
Representing the United States
World Championships (LC)
Silver medal – second place	2007 Melbourne	25 km open water
Pan Pacific Championships
Silver medal – second place	2006 Victoria	10 km open water
Pan American Games
Bronze medal – third place	1999 Winnipeg	200m Butterfly

Kalyn Keller (born April 3, 1985), also known by her married name Kaylyn Keller Robinson is an American former competition swimmer who competed for the University of Southern California, and represented the United States at the 2004 Summer Olympics in Athens, Greece, where she competed in the women's 800-meter freestyle placing fourth, and the 400 meter freestyle placing tenth. As a Freshman at USC, she set a new American and NCAA record for the 1500 meter freestyle.

Kalyn Keller was born April 3, 1985 in Phoenix, Arizona, the youngest of three siblings who would become competitive swimmers. From an athletic family, her mother competed in swimming for Arizona State. Kalyn is the younger sister of American swimmer Klete Keller, who was an Olympic medalists, swam in three Olympics, and was a member of the 2004 U.S. Olympic team with Kalyn. Brother Klete was an NCAA champion during his two years at USC, attending from 2001-02. Her sister Kelsey was a swimmer for Washington. Kaylyn attended Arcadia High School in Phoenix, Arizona graduating around 2004. As a Junior at Arcadia High, she won the 100-yard backstroke to take the Class 4A Arizona State Title on November 3, 2001.

During her High School years, while representing the Phoenix Swim Club in 2003 at the U.S. Summer Nationals in Maryland, she won national titles in the 400-meter freestyle with a time of 4:10.68, the 800-meter freestyle with a time of 8:31.54, and the 1,500-meter freestyle with a time of 16:08.64. Her three wins propelled her into the spotlight as a rising star in American distance swimming.

== 2004 Athens Olympics ==
In her Freshman year at USC, she participated in the 2004 Athens Olympics, where she competed in the women's 800-meter freestyle, finishing in a very close fourth place with a time of 8:26.97 in the event final. Keller was only .36 seconds away from contending for a bronze medal. Ai Shabata of Japan won the gold with a time of 8:24.54, Manaudou of France won the silver with a time of 8:24.96, and American team mate Diana Munz won the bronze with a time of 8:26.61.

In the women's 400-meter freestyle, she swam in the preliminary heats and recorded the tenth-best overall time of 4:09.83. Laure Manaudou of France won the gold with a time of 4:05.34, Otylia Jedrzejczak of Poland won the silver with a time of 4:05.84, and teammate Kaitlin Sandeno won the bronze with a time of 4:06.19.

=== International highlights ===
As shown in the medal record pull-down at right, in international competition, Kalyn won a silver at the 2007 World Championships in Melbourne, Australia in the 25 km Open Water competition, another silver at the 2006 Pan Pacific Championships in Victoria, British Columbia, Canada in the 10Km Open water competition, and a bronze at the 1999 Pan American Games in Winnipeg, Canada in the 200 meter butterfly.

=== University of Southern California ===
She competed in her collegiate career at the University of Southern California from around 2004-2007, where she was primarily managed and trained by Hall of Fame Coach Mark Schubert.

With an outstanding year as a USC Freshman in 2004, Keller established the NCAA, American, and USC record, when she placed first at the 2004 NCAA Championships in the 1500m freestyle with a time of 15:49.14 (sort course meters). As a Sophomore in 2005, Keller received All-American recognition swimming for USC's 4x200 freestyle relay and also earned a title in the Pac-10 Championships. As a Junior in 2006, at the 2006 U.S. Open Water National Championships in June, she placed second in the 10k. In a remarkably close finish, her time of 2:00.22 was only two seconds behind the winner. As a Junior at the NCAA Championships in 2006, whe placed ninth in the 500-yard freestyle with a time of 4:43.19 and finished 24th with a 16:34.24 in the 1650y free. At the 2006 PAC-10 Conference Championships, she captured her fourth conference crown as a collegian, and swam a 4:41.89 for the 500y free, placing second and placed second again in the 1650-yard (1 mile) free style. She left USC during her senior season to begin competing for the University of Michigan's Club Wolverine.

Around 2007, Keller swam with Club Wolverine at the University of Michigan where she was coached by Jon Urbanchek.

Shortly before the 2008 Olympics, Keller retired from swimming in order to battle Crohn's disease.

She married Keenan Robinson in October 2012 in Birmingham, Michigan, and they had a daughter in 2014. Robinson was an athletic trainer who had worked with Michael Phelps at North Baltimore Aquatics.

=== Careers ===
Keller served as a commentator and reporter during the 2008 United States Olympic Swimming Trials. She worked as a head athletic trainer for team USA swimming, including during the 2012 Summer Olympics and 2016 Summer Olympics.

Speaking at St. Ambrose Catholic School, Keller told her audience that after attending graduate school and embracing Catholicism, she was working for the Department of Defense.

== See also ==
- List of University of Southern California people
