= Rebecca Linton =

New Zealand swimmer (born 1985)

Personal information
- Full name: Rebecca Jane Linton
- National team: New Zealand
- Born: 26 September 1985 (age 41) Auckland, New Zealand
- Height: 1.75 m (5 ft 9 in)
- Weight: 62 kg (137 lb)

Sport
- Sport: Swimming
- Strokes: Freestyle
- Club: Howick Pakuranga

Rebecca Jane Linton (born 26 September 1985) is a New Zealand former swimmer, who specialised in long-distance freestyle events. She held New Zealand records in the 400 and 800 m freestyle, until they were all broken by Lauren Boyle in 2012. Linton is also a member of Howick Pakuranga Swim Club in Auckland.

Linton qualified for three swimming events at the 2004 Summer Olympics in Athens, by clearing FINA B-standard entry times of 4:19.03 (400 m freestyle) and 8:52.08 (800 m freestyle) from the New Zealand Championships.

On the second day of the Games, Linton placed thirty-first overall in the 400 m freestyle. Swimming in heat two, she edged out South Korea's Ha Eun-Ju to take a sixth seed by 0.07 of a second in 4:21.58. She also teamed up with Helen Norfolk, Alison Fitch, and Nathalie Bernard in the 4 × 200 m freestyle relay. She swam a third leg in heat two with a split of 2:05.17, but the New Zealand settled for seventh place and thirteenth overall, in a final time of 8:14.76. In her third and final event, 800 m freestyle, Linton picked up a seventh seed in heat three, but was unable to break a 9-minute barrier with a time of 9:02.41. Linton failed to reach the top 8 final, as she placed twenty-fourth overall from the morning's preliminaries.

Shortly after the Olympics, Linton retired from swimming to focus on her studies at the University of Auckland. In 2008, she graduated with the bachelor's degree of psychology and management, before joining the New Zealand Police.
