= Sarah Paton =

Australian former swimmer (born 1986)

Personal information
- Full name: Sarah Paton
- National team: Australia
- Born: 28 October 1986 (age 40) Nowra, New South Wales
- Height: 1.77 m (5 ft 10 in)
- Weight: 59 kg (130 lb)

Sport
- Sport: Swimming
- Strokes: Freestyle
- Club: Telopea Swim Club
- College team: University of Bath (UK)

Sarah Paton (born 28 October 1986) is an Australian former swimmer who specialized in long-distance freestyle events. She is the sister of swimmer Siobhan Paton, who won six gold medals at the 2000 Summer Paralympics, and holds 13 world records in S14 category (intellectual disability). Paton is also a member of Telopea Swim Club, and is coached and trained by Mark Skimming.

Paton qualified for the women's 800-metre freestyle at the 2004 Summer Olympics in Athens, by clearing a FINA A-standard entry time of 8:34.70 from the Olympic trials in Sydney. She challenged seven other swimmers on the second heat, including former bronze medalist Jana Henke of Germany and top medal favorite Diana Munz of the United States. Paton cruised to fourth place by five seconds behind Munz in 8:35.81, but missed the final by more than a second, as she placed ninth overall in the preliminaries.

Shortly after the Olympics, Paton finished fourth behind her teammate Melissa Gorman, but dipped under 8:30 barrier in the same distance at the FINA World Short Course Swimming Championships in Indianapolis, Indiana, with a time of 8:25.38.

In 2005, Paton won her first ever individual career title in the 1500 m freestyle at the Australian long course championships in Sydney, in a qualifying entry time of 16:17.20. Paton's effort and triumph from the trials moved her up to third in the world rankings for the said distance. At the FINA World Championships in Montreal, Canada, Paton missed the final with a tenth-place finish in the 1500-metre freestyle, outside her entry time of 16:37.18.

In 2006, Paton moved to England to train and take up an academic scholarship with a degree in sports performance at the University of Bath. She also coaches with swimmer Aaron Moores, who later won a silver medal in the 100-metre backstroke (S14) at the 2012 Summer Paralympics in London.
