= Simona Păduraru =

Romanian swimmer

Personal information
- Full name: Simona Păduraru
- Nationality: Romania
- Born: 24 November 1981 (age 44) Bacău
- Height: 1.75 m (5 ft 9 in)
- Weight: 70 kg (154 lb)

Sport
- Sport: Swimming
- Strokes: Freestyle
Medal record
European Championships (LC)
| Gold medal – first place | 2000 Helsinki | 4×200 m freestyle |
| Bronze medal – third place | 1999 Istanbul | 4×200 m freestyle |
| Bronze medal – third place | 2004 Madrid | 4×200 m freestyle |

Simona Păduraru (born 21 November 1981 in Bacău) is an international freestyle swimmer from Romania, who represented her native country at two consecutive Summer Olympics, starting in 2000 in Sydney, Australia. Prior to that tournament, at the 2000 European Aquatics Championships in Helsinki, Finland, she was a member of the women's relay team that won the gold medal in the 4×200 m freestyle and the bronze medal in the 4×100 m freestyle. After retiring and giving birth to her first child, Maria-Catinca, in 2007, Simona continued taking part in swimming events. In 2018, she was awarded the title of Honorable Citizen of the city Bacău by the city mayor at that time.
