= Paola Duguet =

Colombian-American swimmer (born 1987)

Personal information
- National team: Colombia
- Born: October 1, 1987 (age 38) New York, United States

Sport
- Sport: Swimming
- Strokes: Freestyle
- Club: Badger Swim Club
- College team: Harvard College

Paola Duguet (born October 1, 1987, in New York, United States) is a Colombian-American Olympic freestyle swimmer. She swam for Colombia at the 2004 Olympics, swimming the 400 (29th) and 800 frees (27th).

She is the daughter of and Noel Duguet, founder and principal of Aravis Capital Advisors, of Briarcliff Manor, and Maria Teresa Duran Duguet, a real estate broker. Paola started swimming at the age of 5 with the Briarcliff Manor Summer Swim Team. By the age of 10, she was ranked #1 in the United States in the 50-yard breaststroke. She consistently ranked among the Top16 fastest swimmers in her age group through the years, winning many Metropolitan Junior Olympics High Point Awards and competing in 8 consecutive Eastern Zone Championships.

With her Badger Swim Club teammates, Kim Kelly, Bridget O'Connor, and Whitney Sprague, they broke one of the longest standing U.S. National Age Group Records in the 15–16-year-olds 800-freestyle relay held by Mission Viejo Swim Club.

In 2003, she participated in her first Colombian National Championships, the first step towards representing that country in the 2004 Summer Olympics. There she won 9 gold medals and established two new Colombian records. In February 2004 she represented Colombia in the 2004 South American Championships in Maldonado, Uruguay, corroborating her qualifying times for Athens and winning bronze in the 800 m freestyle. Paola represented Colombia in many international events, including the World Championships in Montreal, the South American Championships in Chile and in Uruguay, the Juegos Bolivarianos in Colombia, among others.

Paola graduated from Hackley School in 2005 where she set new school records in the Girls 200-yd and 500-yd freestyle while in the eighth grade. She attended Harvard College from where she graduated in 2009.
