= Flavia Rigamonti =

Swiss swimmer

Personal information
- Full name: Flavia Rigamonti
- National team: Switzerland
- Born: 1 July 1981 (age 45) Sorengo, Switzerland
- Height: 1.85 m (6 ft 1 in)
- Weight: 73 kg (161 lb)

Sport
- Sport: Swimming
- Strokes: Freestyle
- Club: Team Atlantide
- College team: Southern Methodist University (2001-2006)
Medal record
Women's swimming
Representing Switzerland
Event	1st	2nd	3rd
World Championships (LC)	0	3	0
World Championships (SC)	0	0	3
European Championships (LC)	2	0	0
European Championships (SC)	3	3	1
Summer Universiade	2	0	0
Total	7	6	4
World Championships (LC)
Silver medal – second place	2001 Fukuoka	1500 m freestyle
Silver medal – second place	2005 Montreal	1500 m freestyle
Silver medal – second place	2007 Melbourne	1500 m freestyle
World Championships (SC)
Bronze medal – third place	1999 Hong Kong	800 m freestyle
Bronze medal – third place	2000 Athens	800 m freestyle
Bronze medal – third place	2002 Moscow	800 m freestyle
European Championships (LC)
Gold medal – first place	2000 Helsinki	800 m freestyle
Gold medal – first place	2008 Eindhoven	1500 m freestyle
European Championships (SC)
Gold medal – first place	1998 Sheffield	800 m freestyle
Gold medal – first place	2001 Antwerp	800 m freestyle
Gold medal – first place	2004 Vienna	800 m freestyle
Silver medal – second place	1996 Rostock	800 m freestyle
Silver medal – second place	1999 Lisbon	800 m freestyle
Silver medal – second place	2002 Riesa	800 m freestyle
Bronze medal – third place	2005 Trieste	800 m freestyle
Summer Universiade
Gold medal – first place	2007 Bangkok	800 m freestyle
Gold medal – first place	2007 Bangkok	1500 m freestyle

Flavia Rigamonti (born 1 July 1981) is a Swiss swimmer from Sorengo. As of 2010, she holds the Swiss Records in the women's 400, 800 and 1500 freestyles.

At the 2007 World Championships, she set the European Record in the women's 1500 free (15:55.38).

Rigamonti swam in the US for Southern Methodist University. She received the 2005-2006 Scholar Athlete Award in the women's swimming category from Conference USA during her senior year.
