= Laure Manaudou =

French swimmer (born 1986)

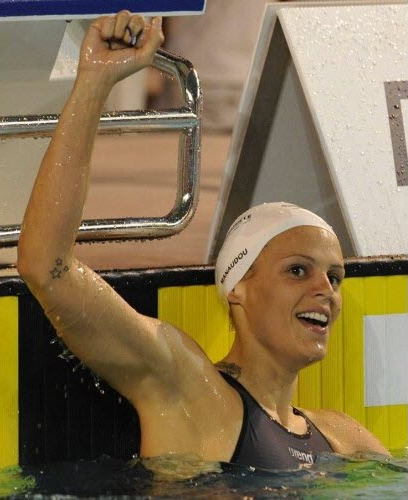
- Manaudou in 2012

Personal information
- National team: France
- Born: 9 October 1986 (age 40) Villeurbanne, France
- Height: 1.80 m (5 ft 11 in)
- Weight: 64 kg (141 lb; 10.1 st)
- Website: lauremanaudou.fr

Sport
- Sport: Swimming
- Strokes: Freestyle, backstroke
Medal record
Women's swimming
Representing France
Event	1st	2nd	3rd
Olympic Games	1	1	1
World Championships (LC)	3	2	1
European Championships (LC)	9	1	3
European Championships (SC)	9	2	4
Mediterranean Games	2	0	0
Total	24	6	9
Olympic Games
Gold medal – first place	2004 Athens	400 m freestyle
Silver medal – second place	2004 Athens	800 m freestyle
Bronze medal – third place	2004 Athens	100 m backstroke
World Championships (LC)
Gold medal – first place	2005 Montreal	400 m freestyle
Gold medal – first place	2007 Melbourne	200 m freestyle
Gold medal – first place	2007 Melbourne	400 m freestyle
Silver medal – second place	2007 Melbourne	800 m freestyle
Silver medal – second place	2007 Melbourne	100 m backstroke
Bronze medal – third place	2007 Melbourne	4 × 200 m freestyle
European Championships (LC)
Gold medal – first place	2004 Madrid	400 m freestyle
Gold medal – first place	2004 Madrid	100 m backstroke
Gold medal – first place	2004 Madrid	4 × 100 m medley
Gold medal – first place	2006 Budapest	400 m freestyle
Gold medal – first place	2006 Budapest	800 m freestyle
Gold medal – first place	2006 Budapest	100 m backstroke
Gold medal – first place	2006 Budapest	200 m medley
Gold medal – first place	2008 Eindhoven	200 m backstroke
Gold medal – first place	2008 Eindhoven	4 × 200 m freestyle
Silver medal – second place	2008 Eindhoven	100 m backstroke
Bronze medal – third place	2006 Budapest	200 m freestyle
Bronze medal – third place	2006 Budapest	4 × 200 m freestyle
Bronze medal – third place	2006 Budapest	4 × 100 m medley
European Championships (SC)
Gold medal – first place	2005 Trieste	400 m freestyle
Gold medal – first place	2005 Trieste	800 m freestyle
Gold medal – first place	2005 Trieste	100 m backstroke
Gold medal – first place	2006 Helsinki	400 m freestyle
Gold medal – first place	2006 Helsinki	800 m freestyle
Gold medal – first place	2006 Helsinki	100 m backstroke
Gold medal – first place	2007 Debrecen	400 m freestyle
Gold medal – first place	2007 Debrecen	100 m backstroke
Gold medal – first place	2012 Chartres	50 m backstroke
Silver medal – second place	2007 Debrecen	200 m freestyle
Silver medal – second place	2012 Chartres	100 m backstroke
Bronze medal – third place	2003 Dublin	100 m backstroke
Bronze medal – third place	2007 Debrecen	4 × 50 m medley
Bronze medal – third place	2008 Rijeka	100 m backstroke
Bronze medal – third place	2012 Chartres	4 × 50 m medley
Mediterranean Games
Gold medal – first place	2005 Almería	400 m freestyle
Gold medal – first place	2005 Almería	50 m backstroke

Laure Manaudou (French pronunciation: [lɔʁ manodu]; born 9 October 1986) is a retired French Olympic, world and European champion swimmer. She has held the world record in freestyle events between 200 and 1500 meter. Her younger brother Florent Manaudou is also an Olympic gold medalist swimmer.

== 2004 Athens Olympic gold ==
She won the gold medal in the women's 400-meter freestyle at the 2004 Athens Olympics. It was France's first gold medal ever in women's swimming and the first swimming gold medal won by a French athlete since Jean Boiteux's victory in the 400-meter men's freestyle event at Helsinki in 1952. Manaudou won the silver medal in the women's 800-meter freestyle at the Athens Olympics. In that race, she had a quick start but was passed down the stretch by Ai Shibata of Japan. She also won the bronze medal in the women's 100-meter backstroke, thus becoming only the 2nd Frenchwoman to win three medals in a single Olympic Games, Summer or Winter. The first one was the track and field athlete Micheline Ostermeyer in London in 1948. Manaudou was by far the best swimmer on the French team, but she did not have the team support to win a medal in the women's 4×200 m freestyle relay.

Manaudou is currently tied for third (three medals altogether) on the all-time list of French multiple female Winter or Summer Olympic medal winners along with Micheline Ostermeyer, Marielle Goitschel, Pascale Trinquet-Hachin, Perrine Pelen, Anne Briand-Bouthiaux, Marie-José Pérec, Félicia Ballanger and Camille Muffat. The all-time leader is the fencer Laura Flessel-Colovic, who has five Olympic medals.

=== 2004 European Championships ===
Laure Manaudou won three gold medals at the 2004 European Swimming Championships in Madrid, Spain, in the 100-metre backstroke, 400-metre freestyle, and the 4×100-metre medley relay.

=== 2005 World Championships ===
On 24 July 2005 at the 2005 World Aquatics Championships in Montreal, Canada, Manaudou won the women's 400-m freestyle. Manaudou was under world record pace for the first half of the race. In the second half of the race, Manaudou was challenged by Shibata, her rival from the Olympics. Pundits were already predicting that Manaudou would eventually eclipse the world-record mark in the 400-m freestyle set by Janet Evans at the 1988 Summer Olympics. This would happen on 12 May 2006, as she broke Evans's world record of 4:03.85 during the final of the French championship in Tours with the time of 4:03.03.

=== 2006 European Championships ===
On 12 May 2006, Manaudou broke Janet Evans's world record in the women's 400-meter freestyle swim that had stood for 18 years. Manaudou then held the same world record for nearly two years.

On 6 August 2006, on the final day of the 2006 European Swimming Championships in Budapest, she broke her own world record with a time of 4:02.13 in winning the 400-m freestyle title. She also won the 800-m freestyle (in European record time), 200-m individual medley and 100-m backstroke titles. In addition, she obtained the bronze medal in the 200-m freestyle, 4×200-m team freestyle and 4×100-m team medley. With her four titles, she equalled the record of the number of individual titles won in the same European swimming championships held by East Germany's Ute Geweniger (1981) and Hungary's Krisztina Egerszegi (1993).

=== 2007 World Championships ===
Manaudou broke the 200-m freestyle world record at the 2007 World Swimming Championships in Melbourne in winning the final. She also won the 400-m freestyle event. She obtained silver medals in the 100-m backstroke and the 800-m freestyle, and a bronze for 4×200-m freestyle relay. In the 100-m backstroke, she became the second woman in history to swim under a minute in the event. She was leading the race in the 800-m final going into the last lap, but the American Kate Ziegler finally overtook her in the last metres to win by a margin of 28 cm. She was thus prevented from becoming the first female swimmer to win the 200-m, 400-m and 800-m freestyle titles at the same World Championships.

== 2008 Beijing Olympics ==
In the 2008 Summer Olympics, Manaudou was unable to recapture her form from the 2004 Summer Olympics in Athens. After starting strong and holding the lead at the 200-meter mark, she finished last (eighth) in the 400-m freestyle final with a finishing time of 4:11.26. After the defeat, Manaudou admitted giving up during the race after struggling to keep up. She then finished seventh in the 100-m backstroke final. In her final hope for a medal, in the 200-m backstroke, she finished last in her semifinal heat and was eliminated.

=== Retirement and comeback ===
On 17 September 2009, at 22 years of age, Manaudou announced through the newspaper Le Parisien her retirement from competitive swimming. She was quoted as saying, "It came to me little by little. I didn’t make it on impulse. It has matured slowly." In October 2010, she returned to training in the United States with the Auburn University Tigers swim team. She made her return to competition on 14 July 2011, in Tigers colours at a small swimming meet in Athens, Georgia, in the United States, where she set a personal record in the 50-m freestyle event (25.84 s).

== 2012 London Olympics ==
Manaudou competed in the 2012 Summer Olympics in three events – 100 m backstroke, 200 m backstroke, and the 4 × 100 m medley relay. She failed to advance from the first round heats in all the three events. However, she was poolside on 3 August as her younger brother Florent won a surprise gold medal in the men's 50 m freestyle final, and embraced him following his victory.

== Personal life ==
The weekly magazine Paris Match ran a cover story on Manaudou in its 5–11 April 2007 issue.

Manaudou is now dating Fréro Delavega singer Jérémy Frérot, with whom she has two sons, and also a daughter from a previous relationship with Frédérick Bousquet.

== Accomplishments ==
Between June 2004 and April 2008, Manaudou remained unbeaten in the 400-metre freestyle, winning 23 finals in succession.

Event		Olympic Games	World Championships		European Championships		
Event		2004 in Athens	2005 in Montréal	2007 in Melbourne	2004 in Madrid	2006 in Budapest	2008 in Eindhoven
Freestyle	200 m			1:55.52 WR		1:58.38	
Freestyle	400 m	4:05.34 ER	4:06.44	4:02.61 CR	4:07.90	4:02.13 WR	
Freestyle	800 m	8:24.96		8:18.80 ER		8:19.29 ER	
Freestyle	4 × 200 m			7:55.96 NR		7:56.44 NR	7:52.09 NR
Backstroke	100 m	1:00.88		59.87 ER	1:00.93	1:00.88	1:00.05
Backstroke	200 m						2:07.99 NR
Medley	200 m					2:12.69	
Medley	4 × 100 m				4:05.96	4:03.64 NR	

- WR : World record
- ER : European record
- NR : National record
- CR : Championship record

=== Career best times ===
- 200-m freestyle: 1.55.51
- 400-m freestyle: 4:02.13
- 800-m freestyle: 8:18.80
- 100-m backstroke: 59.50
- 200-m backstroke: 2:06.64

== See also ==
- World record progression 200 metres freestyle
- World record progression 400 metres freestyle
- World record progression 800 metres freestyle
- World record progression 1500 metres freestyle

Records
Preceded by Petra Schneider	Women's 1500 metre freestyle world record holder (short course); 20 November 2004 – 12 October 2007	Succeeded by Kate Ziegler
Preceded by Sachiko Yamada	Women's 800 metre freestyle world record holder (short course); 9 December 2005 – 12 October 2007	Succeeded by Kate Ziegler
Preceded by Lindsay Benko	Women's 400 metre freestyle world record holder (short course); 10 December 2005 – 8 August 2009	Succeeded by Joanne Jackson
Preceded by Janet Evans	Women's 400 metre freestyle world record holder (long course); 12 May 2006 – 24 March 2008	Succeeded by Federica Pellegrini
Preceded by Federica Pellegrini	Women's 200 metre freestyle world record holder (long course); 28 March 2007 – 11 August 2008	Succeeded by Federica Pellegrini
Awards
Preceded by Tony Parker; Ladji Doucouré	French Sportsperson of the Year; 2004; 2006	Succeeded by Ladji Doucouré; Sébastien Loeb & Daniel Elena
Preceded by Otylia Jędrzejczak	European Swimmer of the Year; 2006–2007	Succeeded by Rebecca Adlington
Preceded by Leisel Jones	World Swimmer of the Year; 2007	Succeeded by Stephanie Rice
