= Hayley Peirsol =

American swimmer

Personal information
- Full name: Hayley Reide Peirsol
- National team: United States
- Born: August 9, 1985 (age 40) Orange County, California, U.S.
- Height: 5 ft 10 in (178 cm)

Sport
- Sport: Swimming
- Strokes: Freestyle
- College team: Auburn University
Medal record
Women's swimming
Representing the United States
World Championships (LC)
Silver medal – second place	2003 Barcelona	1500 m freestyle
Bronze medal – third place	2007 Melbourne	800 m freestyle
Pan Pacific Championships
Silver medal – second place	2006 Victoria	1500 m freestyle
Bronze medal – third place	2002 Yokohama	800 m freestyle
Bronze medal – third place	2006 Victoria	800 m freestyle
Summer Universiade
Gold medal – first place	2005 Izmir	1500 m freestyle
Silver medal – second place	2005 Izmir	800 m freestyle

Hayley Reide Peirsol (born August 9, 1985) is an American former distance swimmer. She swam under Dave Salo with Irvine Novaquatics prior to attending Auburn University. While at Auburn, Peirsol trained under David Marsh, Dorsey Tierney and the late Ralph Crocker. She earned 3 individual NCAA titles and 3 individual SEC titles in the 1650 freestyle as well as 3 NCAA and 4 SEC team titles. In 2006 and 2007, Peirsol also trained with Club Wolverine at the University of Michigan along with teammates Erik Vendt, Michael Phelps, Klete and Kalyn Keller, and Kaitlin Sandeno under Bob Bowman and distance expert Jon Urbanchek. In 2006, Hayley became the third woman in history to ever break 16 minutes in the 1500 meter freestyle, the other two women being Janet Evans and Kate Ziegler.

In 2007, Peirsol retired from swimming with the desire of making her name known as a triathlete. She trained under former World Champion Siri Lindley in Santa Monica, California with teammates Mirinda Carfrae (2010 Ironman World Champion), Jenny Fletcher and New Zealander Samantha Warriner. In May 2009 she took second place in her first ITU race which was in her brother's hometown of Austin, Texas.[2] Hayley received the Rookie of the Year award in 2009 from the ITU federation for her accomplishments in her new sport.

Peirsol then moved to Berkeley, California, after retiring from competitive sports. In the Bay Area, she attended a three-year program at Rudolf Steiner's Bay Area Center for Waldorf Teacher Training. In 2016 she moved to Costa Rica where she was the lead teacher in a start-up Waldorf School in Lake Arenal, and did youth work in Nosara, teaching children about ocean safety and environmental awareness. Peirsol now lives in Lake Como, Italy.

Her brother, American backstroker Aaron Peirsol, is a multiple Olympic Games gold medalist, having competed in Greece, Australia and China. Hayley and Aaron are the first of two sibling duos to medal at the same FINA World Championships (in 2003 and 2007), along with Bronte Campbell and Cate Campbell who earned a silver medal on the same 4x100 meter freestyle relay in Barcelona in 2013.

== Best times ==
- LC 400 m Free - 04:06.31, 2006 ConocoPhillips National Championships, August 1, 2006
- LC 800 m Free - 08:26.41, 2007 World Championships, March 31, 2007
- LC 1500 m Free - 15:57.36, 2006 Pan Pacific Swimming Championships, August 17, 2006
- LC 400 m Individual Medley - 04:48.30, 2002 ConocoPhillips National Championships, August 12, 2002

== See also ==
- List of World Aquatics Championships medalists in swimming (women)
