= Ai Shibata =

Japanese swimmer (born 1982)

Personal information
- Full name: Ai Shibata
- Nationality: Japan
- Born: 14 May 1982 (age 44) Dazaifu, Fukuoka
- Height: 1.76 m (5 ft 9 in)

Sport
- Sport: Swimming
- Strokes: freestyle
- College team: National Institute of Fitness and Sports in Kanoya
Medal record
Women's swimming
Representing Japan
Olympic Games
Gold medal – first place	2004 Athens	800 m freestyle
World Championships (LC)
Silver medal – second place	2005 Montreal	400 m freestyle
Bronze medal – third place	2005 Montreal	800 m freestyle
Bronze medal – third place	2007 Melbourne	400 m freestyle
Bronze medal – third place	2007 Melbourne	1500 m freestyle
Pan Pacific Championships
Gold medal – first place	2006 Victoria	400 m freestyle
Silver medal – second place	2006 Victoria	800 m freestyle
Bronze medal – third place	2006 Victoria	1500 m freestyle
Bronze medal – third place	2006 Victoria	4×200 m freestyle

Ai Shibata (柴田 亜衣, Shibata Ai; born May 14, 1982) is a Japanese former swimmer. At the 2004 Summer Olympics, she won the gold medal in the 800 meter freestyle race. She was the first ever female gold medalist for Japan in a freestyle event. She attended the National Institute of Fitness and Sports in Kanoya. In 2008 Shibata announced her retirement.
