= Olga Beresnyeva =

Ukrainian swimmer (born 1985)

Personal information
- Born: October 12, 1985 (age 41) Zhdanov, Soviet Union

Sport
- Sport: Swimming
Medal record
Representing Ukraine
Summer Universiade
Bronze medal – third place	2003 Daegu	800 m freestyle
European Junior Championships
Silver medal – second place	2000 Dunkerque	800 m freestyle
Silver medal – second place	2001 Malta	800 m freestyle
Bronze medal – third place	2001 Malta	400 m freestyle
European Youth Olympic Festival
Bronze medal – third place	1999 Esbjerg	400 m freestyle
European Championships
Gold medal – first place	2010 Budapest	25 km open water

Olga Beresnyeva (Ukrainian: Ольга Береснєва, Hebrew: אולגה ברנסייבה; born 12 October 1985), is an Olympic and national-record holding distance swimmer for Ukraine. She also competed for Israel between 2004 and 2010, before returning to her native Ukraine.

== Career ==
She has swum at the:

- Olympics: 2000, 2004, 2012
- World Championships: 2003, 2005, 2009, 2011, 2013
- European Championships: 2010
- Open Water Worlds: 2008, 2010

She swam for Ukraine at her first Olympic Games in 2000, at the age of 14; and at her second Olympics in 2004.

At the 2003 World Championships, she set the Ukraine Record in the 1500 free (16:27.76).

After the 2004 Olympics, she change sport nationality to Israel. After failing to qualify for the 2008 Olympics, Beresnyeva returned to Ukraine.

Originally a distance swimmer in the pool, she began swimming open water races in 2008. Beresnyeva won the 25K race at the 2010 European Championships, the first time she swam the race.

She swam in her third Olympics in 2012, swimming the Open Water event, but was disqualified and excluded from the Games by the IOC in June 2015 after re-analysis of a drug test showed she had been doping.

== See also ==
- List of Israeli records in swimming
