= Shrone Austin =

Seychellois swimmer (born 1989)

Personal information
- Full name: Shrone Austin
- National team: Seychelles
- Born: 31 January 1989 (age 37) Victoria, Seychelles
- Height: 1.75 m (5 ft 9 in)
- Weight: 70 kg (154 lb)

Sport
- Sport: Swimming
- Strokes: Freestyle, breaststroke
Medal record
Women's swimming
Representing the Seychelles
All-Africa Games
Silver medal – second place	2003 Abuja	800 m freestyle
Silver medal – second place	2003 Abuja	1500 m freestyle
Silver medal – second place	2003 Abuja	400 m medley
Bronze medal – third place	2003 Abuja	400 m freestyle
Bronze medal – third place	2011 Maputo	800 m freestyle
Bronze medal – third place	2011 Maputo	1500 m freestyle

Shrone Austin (born January 31, 1989) is a Seychellois swimmer, who specialized in freestyle and breaststroke events. She first competed in the women's 100 m breaststroke at the 2004 Summer Olympics, before turning her sights on the long-distance freestyle at the 2008 Summer Olympics. Apart from her Olympic career, Austin had collected a career total of six medals (three silvers and three bronzes) in two editions of the All-Africa Games (2003 and 2011).

Austin made her own swimming history, as Seychelles' youngest ever athlete (aged 15), at the 2004 Summer Olympics in Athens, where she competed in the 100 m breaststroke. Swimming in heat one, she raced to third and forty-third overall in her lifetime best of 1:19.02, almost a full-second margin behind Armenia's Varduhi Avetisyan (0.15) and three-time Olympian and leader Katerine Moreno (0.67).

At the 2008 Summer Olympics in Beijing, Austin decided to drop her breaststroke specialty, and instead challenge herself with a long-distance freestyle. Swimming against Hungary's Boglárka Kapás, and Thailand's Natthanan Junkrajang (who later forced to pull out from the prelims) in heat one of the 400 m freestyle, Austin came up with a steady swim throughout the race, but could not catch her Hungarian rival near the wall to finish only in second and forty-first at 4:35.86.

Austin also competed in three events at the 2006 Commonwealth Games held in Melbourne, Australia, she competed in the freestyle events for the 200 metres, the 400 metres and the 800 metres but didn't reach the final in any of the three events.

== Achievements ==
Austin won the Seychelles Sportswoman of the year in 2003 when she was just 14 years old.
