= Linda Mackenzie =

Australian swimmer

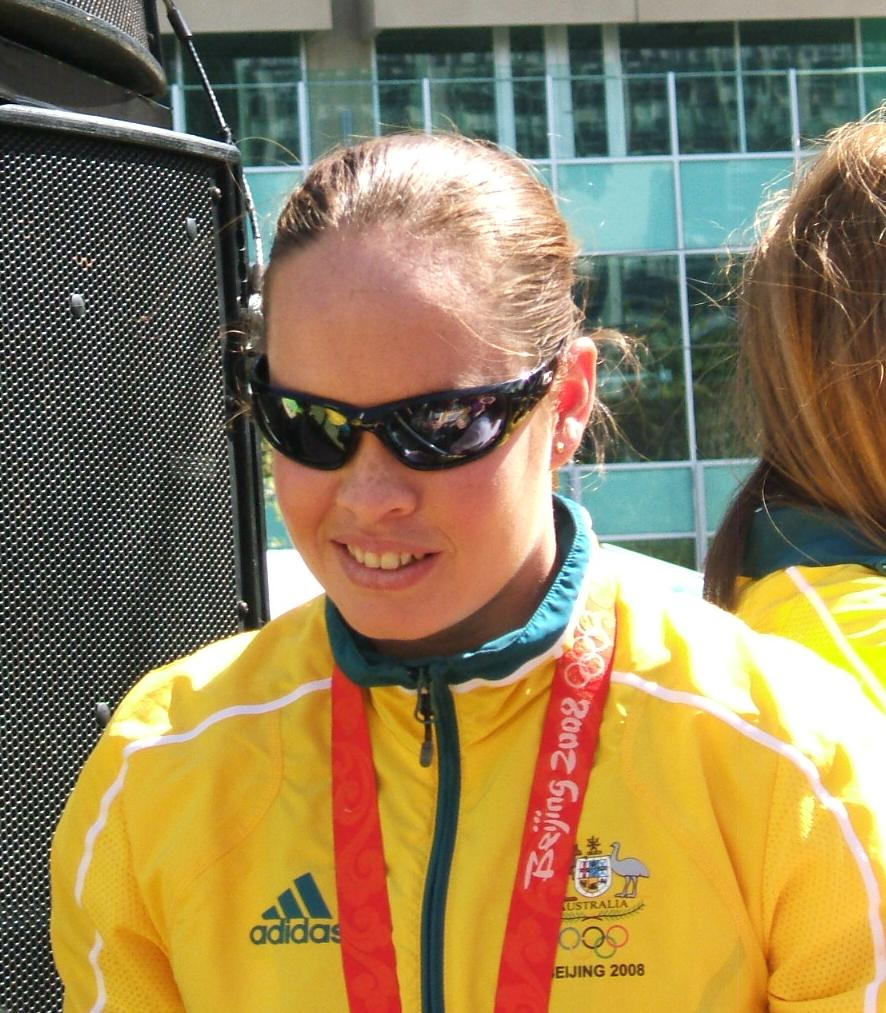

Personal information
- Full name: Linda June Mackenzie
- National team: Australia
- Born: 14 December 1983 (age 42) Mackay, Queensland
- Height: 1.61 m (5 ft 3 in)
- Weight: 52 kg (115 lb)

Sport
- Sport: Swimming
- Strokes: Freestyle
Medal record
Women's swimming
Representing Australia
Olympic Games
Gold medal – first place	2008 Beijing	4×200 m freestyle
World Championships - Long Course
Silver medal – second place	2005 Montreal	4×200 m freestyle
Silver medal – second place	2003 Barcelona	4×200 m freestyle
Pan Pacific Championships
Silver medal – second place	2006 Victoria	200 m freestyle
Silver medal – second place	2006 Victoria	4×200 m freestyle
Bronze medal – third place	2006 Victoria	4×100 m freestyle
Commonwealth Games
Gold medal – first place	2006 Melbourne	4×200 m freestyle

Linda June Mackenzie, OAM (born 14 December 1983) is an Australian freestyle swimmer. She preferred the longer 200-, 400-, and 800-metre events and won the Australian 400-metre national title five years in a row (2004–2008). She was part of the Australian team that won the gold medal in the 4×200-metre freestyle relay at the 2006 Commonwealth Games in Melbourne and has picked up silver medals in the same event at the 2003 and 2005 world championships.

Mackenzie qualified for the 200-metre and 400-metre freestyle events at the Olympic Games in Beijing and was a member of the winning Australian team in the women's 4×200-metre freestyle relay. She was the last swimmer in the 4×200-metre freestyle relay at the 2008 Beijing Olympics. Together with Stephanie Rice, Bronte Barratt and Kylie Palmer the world record was broken by 5.78 seconds.

She was an Australian Institute of Sport scholarship holder.

== See also ==
- World record progression 4 × 200 metres freestyle relay
