= Tanya Hunks =

Canadian swimmer (born 1980)

Personal information
- Full name: Tanya Hunks
- National team: Canada
- Born: August 24, 1980 (age 45) Brantford, Ontario
- Height: 1.68 m (5 ft 6 in)
- Weight: 55 kg (121 lb)

Sport
- Sport: Swimming
- Strokes: Freestyle, medley
- College team: University of British Columbia
Medal record
Women's swimming
Representing Canada
Pan Pacific Championships
Bronze medal – third place	2006 Victoria	10 km open water
Pan American Games
Bronze medal – third place	2007 Rio de Janeiro	10 km open water

Tanya Hunks (born August 24, 1980) is a former competitive swimmer from Canada. Hunks won bronze medals in the 10-kilometre open water swimming events at the 2006 Pan Pacific Swimming Championships and 2007 Pan American Games. She swam in the 400-metre and 800-metre freestyle events, in addition to the 400-metre individual medley at the 2008 Summer Olympics in Beijing.
