= Jana Henke =

German swimmer (born 1973)

Personal information
- Nationality: Germany
- Born: 1 October 1973 (age 52) Löbau, Saxony, East Germany
- Height: 1.70 m (5 ft 7 in)
- Weight: 60 kg (132 lb)

Sport
- Sport: Swimming
- Strokes: Freestyle
- Club: OSC Potsdam
Medal record
Women's swimming
Representing Germany
Olympic Games
Bronze medal – third place	1992 Barcelona	800 m freestyle
World Championships (LC)
Bronze medal – third place	1991 Perth	800 m freestyle
Bronze medal – third place	2003 Barcelona	1500 m freestyle
European Championships (LC)
Gold medal – first place	1993 Sheffield	800 m freestyle
Gold medal – first place	2002 Berlin	800 m freestyle
Silver medal – second place	1991 Athens	800 m freestyle
Silver medal – second place	1995 Vienna	800 m freestyle
Bronze medal – third place	1997 Seville	800 m freestyle
Bronze medal – third place	1999 Istanbul	800 m freestyle
European Championships (SC)
Bronze medal – third place	1999 Lisbon	800 m freestyle

Jana Henke (born 1 October 1973 in Löbau, Saxony) is a former freestyle swimmer from Germany, becoming two times European champion in 800 m freestyle.

== Career ==
She also won the bronze medal in the 800 m freestyle at the 1992 Summer Olympics in Barcelona, Spain. She competed in three Summer Olympics for her native country.
