= Brittany Reimer =

Canadian swimmer

Personal information
- Full name: Brittany Reimer
- National team: Canada
- Born: January 3, 1988 (age 38) Victoria, British Columbia
- Height: 1.75 m (5 ft 9 in)
- Weight: 63 kg (139 lb)

Sport
- Sport: Swimming
- Strokes: Freestyle
- Club: Surrey Knights
Medal record
Women's swimming
Representing Canada
World Championships
Silver medal – second place	2005 Montreal	800 m freestyle
Bronze medal – third place	2005 Montreal	1500 m freestyle
Commonwealth Games
Bronze medal – third place	2006 Melbourne	800 m freestyle

Brittany Reimer (born January 3, 1988) is a Canadian former freestyle swimmer. She is a two-time medallist at the World Championships and swam at the 2004 Summer Olympics.

== Career ==
Reimer competed at the 2004 Summer Olympics in the 200, 400, and 800-metre freestyle. Reimer also competed in the 4×100-metre medley relay.

At the 2005 World Aquatics Championships, Reimer won silver in the 800-metre freestyle and bronze in the 1500-metre freestyle. She placed fourth in the women's 400-metre freestyle and broke three Canadian records at this competition.

At the Commonwealth Games in 2006, Reimer won a bronze medal in the women's 800-metre freestyle.

Brittany Reimer is now working as a realtor at MLA Canada Realty in Surrey, British Columbia.

== See also ==
- List of World Aquatics Championships medalists in swimming (women)
- List of Commonwealth Games medallists in swimming (women)
