= Sachiko Yamada (swimmer) =

Japanese swimmer (born 1982)

Personal information
- Full name: Sachiko Yamada
- Nationality: Japan
- Born: October 15, 1982 (age 43) Osaka, Japan
- Height: 1.76 m (5 ft 9 in)
- Weight: 61 kg (134 lb)

Sport
- Sport: Swimming
- Strokes: Freestyle
Medal record
Women's swimming
Representing Japan
World Championships (SC)
Gold medal – first place	2004 Indianapolis	800 m freestyle
Bronze medal – third place	2004 Indianapolis	400 m freestyle
Pan Pacific Championships
Silver medal – second place	2002 Yokohama	800 m freestyle
Silver medal – second place	2002 Yokohama	1500 m freestyle
Bronze medal – third place	2002 Yokohama	400 m freestyle
Bronze medal – third place	2002 Yokohama	4×200 m freestyle
Bronze medal – third place	2006 Victoria	400 m freestyle
Universiade
Gold medal – first place	2001 Beijing	1500 m freestyle
Bronze medal – third place	2001 Beijing	400 m freestyle
Bronze medal – third place	2001 Beijing	800 m freestyle

Sachiko Yamada (山田沙知子, Yamada Sachiko; born October 15, 1982) is an Olympic and former World-Record-holding freestyle swimmer from Japan. She swam for Japan at the 2000 and 2004 Olympics.

Yamada was born in Osaka, Japan.

== Major achievements ==
- 2000 Olympics - 800 m freestyle 8th (8:37.39)
- 2004 Olympics - 400 m freestyle 6th (4:10.91)

== Personal bests ==
In long course

- 400 m freestyle: 4:07.23
- 800 m freestyle: 8:23.68 Asian Record

== See also ==
- World record progression 800 metres freestyle

Records
Preceded by CHEN Hua	World Record Holder; Women's 800 Freestyle (25m); February 4, 2002 – December 9, 2005	Succeeded by Laure Manaudou
