= Rebecca Cooke (swimmer) =

British swimmer (born 1983)

Personal information
- Full name: Rebecca Cooke
- National team: Great Britain
- Born: 24 June 1983 (age 43) Newbury, Berkshire, England
- Height: 1.72 m (5 ft 8 in)
- Weight: 55 kg (121 lb)

Sport
- Sport: Swimming
- Strokes: Freestyle, medley
- Club: Banchory Beavers
Medal record
Women's swimming
Representing Great Britain
World Championships (LC)
Bronze medal – third place	2003 Barcelona	800 m freestyle
World Championships (SC)
Bronze medal – third place	2006 Shanghai	800 m freestyle
European Championships (LC)
Bronze medal – third place	2006 Budapest	800 m freestyle
European Championships (SC)
Silver medal – second place	2000 Valencia	800 m freestyle
Silver medal – second place	2003 Dublin	400 m freestyle
Silver medal – second place	2003 Dublin	800 m freestyle
Bronze medal – third place	2000 Valencia	400 m freestyle
Summer Universiade
Gold medal – first place	2003 Daegu	400 m freestyle
Gold medal – first place	2003 Daegu	800 m freestyle
Gold medal – first place	2003 Daegu	1500 m freestyle
Gold medal – first place	2005 Izmir	800 m freestyle
Silver medal – second place	2005 Izmir	400 m freestyle
Silver medal – second place	2005 Izmir	1500 m freestyle
Silver medal – second place	2005 Izmir	400 m individual medley
Bronze medal – third place	2003 Daugu	400 m individual medley
Representing England
Commonwealth Games
Gold medal – first place	2002 Manchester	400 m freestyle
Gold medal – first place	2002 Manchester	800 m freestyle
Gold medal – first place	2006 Melbourne	800 m freestyle
Silver medal – second place	2006 Melbourne	400 m individual medley

Rebecca Cooke (born 24 June 1983) is a retired British swimmer.

== Swimming career ==
Cooke represented Great Britain in the Olympics, World Aquatics Championships (known as the FINA World Championships until 2022), European championships, and England in the Commonwealth Games. She competed internationally in freestyle and individual medley swimming events. She has won medals at every major international championships with the exception of the Olympic Games. She won the ASA National Championship 800 metres freestyle title for six consecutive years from 2000 until 2005.

She retired from international competition in April 2008 after failing to make the British team for the 2008 Games in Beijing.

== See also ==
- List of World Aquatics Championships medalists in swimming (women)
- List of Commonwealth Games medallists in swimming (women)
