= 2003 NCAA Division I Women's Swimming and Diving Championships =

American college aquatic sports competition

- Host city: Auburn, Alabama
- Date: March 2003
- Venue: James E. Martin Aquatics Center

The 2003 NCAA Women's Division I Swimming and Diving Championships were contested at the 22nd annual NCAA-sanctioned swim meet to determine the team and individual national champions of Division I women's collegiate swimming and diving in the United States.

This year's events were hosted by Auburn University at the James E. Martin Aquatics Center in Auburn, Alabama.

Defending champions Auburn once again topped the team standings, finishing 163 points ahead of Georgia. This was the Tigers' second women's team title.

== Team standings ==
- Note: Top 10 only
- (H) = Hosts
- ^{(DC)} = Defending champions
- Full results

Rank	Team	Points
1st place, gold medalist(s)	Auburn (H) ^{(DC)}	536
2nd place, silver medalist(s)	Georgia	373
3rd place, bronze medalist(s)	USC	284
4	SMU	281
5	Florida	277
6	Stanford	275 1/2
7	Texas	220
8	California	215
9	Arizona	209
10	Arizona State	135

== Swimming results ==
Event	Gold		Silver		Bronze	
50 freestyle	Maritza Correia; Georgia	21.83	Becky Short; Auburn	22.11	Eileen Coparropa; Auburn	22.40
100 freestyle	Becky Short; Auburn	48.64	Maritza Correia; Georgia	48.75	Lacey Boutwell; Stanford	49.04
200 freestyle	Jessi Perruquet; North Carolina Heather Kemp; Auburn	1:45.01	None awarded		Julie Hardt; Georgia	1:45.14
500 freestyle	Flavia Rigamonti; SMU	4:37.32	Kaitlin Sandeno; USC	4:39.31	Sara McLarty; Florida	4:39.42
1650 freestyle	Flavia Rigamonti; SMU	15:43.90	Cara Lane; Virginia	15:53.49	Kaitlin Sandeno; USC	15:58.58
100 backstroke	Natalie Coughlin; California	50.92	Kirsty Coventry; Auburn	53.01	Beth Botsford; Arizona	53.46
200 backstroke	Natalie Coughlin; California	1:53.53	Kirsty Coventry; Auburn	1:54.16	Margaret Hoelzer; Auburn	1:54.19
100 breaststroke	Tara Kirk; Stanford	58.62	Maggie Bowen; Auburn	59.86	Sarah Poewe; Georgia	59.89
200 breaststroke	Vipa Bernhardt; Florida	2:09.13	Ágnes Kovács; Arizona State	2:09.96	Tara Kirk; Stanford	2:10.41
100 butterfly	Natalie Coughlin; California	50.62	Mary DeScenza; Georgia	51.93	Margaret Hoelzer; Auburn	52.03
200 butterfly	Mary DeScenza; Georgia	1:55.10	Emily Mason; Arizona	1:55.33	Jana Krohn; USC	1:56.02
200 IM	Maggie Bowen; Auburn	1:55.33	Alenka Kejžar; SMU Kirsty Coventry; Auburn	1:57.28	None awarded	
400 IM	Maggie Bowen; Auburn	4:06.15	Emily Mason; Arizona	4:07.07	Kaitlin Sandeno; USC	4:07.20
200 freestyle relay	Georgia; Neka Mabry (23.00); Paige Kearns (22.09); Samantha Arsenault (22.69); Maritza Correia (21.18)	1:28.96	Auburn; Becky Short (22.13); Jana Kolukanova (22.72); Erin Gayle (22.57); Eileen Coparropa (22.62)	1:29.04	Texas; Sarah Wanezek (22.64); Joscelin Yeo (22.09); Lacey Elliott (22.66); Erin Phenix (22.22)	1:29.61
400 freestyle relay	Auburn; Maggie Bowen (49.54); Eileen Coparropa (49.32); Leslie Lunsmann (49.38); Kirsty Coventry (49.14)	3:17.38	Georgia; Neka Mabry (50.71); Paige Kearns (49.11); Samantha Arsenault (50.12); Maritza Correia (47.78)	3:17.72	Texas; Joscelin Yeo (49.74); Michelle Molina (50.71); Sarah Wanezek (48.79); Tanica Jamison (48.51)	3:17.75
800 freestyle relay	Auburn; Margaret Hoelzer (1:45.37); Heather Kemp (1:45.50); Kirsty Coventry (1:45.12); Maggie Bowen (1:46.73)	7:02.72	Georgia; Mary DeScenza (1:45.85); Julie Hardt (1:45.60); Samantha Arsenault (1:47.33); Maritza Correia (1:46.91)	7:05.69	USC; Kaitlin Sandeno (1:46.87); Margie Pedder (1:47.46); Jana Krohn (1:48.41); Michala Kwasny (1:47.06)	7:09.80
200 medley relay	Auburn; Jenni Anderson (24.97); Laura Swander (27.20); Margaret Hoelzer (22.98); Becky Short (21.54)	1:36.69; US, AR	Stanford; Amy Wagner (25.73); Tara Kirk (26.81); Dana Kirk (23.78); Sarah Jones (22.10)	1:38.42	California; Natalie Coughlin (24.20); Staciana Stitts (27.42); Natalie Griffith (24.48); Michelle Harper (22.55)	1:38.65
400 medley relay	Auburn; Kirsty Coventry (53.09); Maggie Bowen (59.05); Margaret Hoelzer (51.73); Becky Short (47.58)	3:31.45; US	Georgia; Lauren Gettel (54.16); Sarah Poewe (59.11); Mary DeScenza (51.68); Maritza Correia (46.86)	3:31.81	California; Helen Silver (54.54); Staciana Stitts (1:00.31); Natalie Coughlin (50.45); Danielle Becks (49.65)	3:34.95

Legend: US – U.S. Open record; AR – American record;

== Diving results ==
Event	Gold		Silver		Bronze	
1 m diving	Yuliya Pakhalina; Houston	339.70	Jaime Sanger; Tennessee	329.90	Blythe Hartley; USC	329.70
3 m diving	Yuliya Pakhalina; Houston	657.30	Blythe Hartley; USC	585.15	Lane Bassham; Alabama	561.85
Platform diving	Natalie Diea; Ohio State	476.65	Blythe Hartley; USC	456.90	Trisha Tumlinson; Arizona State	456.55

== See also ==
- List of college swimming and diving teams
