= Swimming at the 2007 World Aquatics Championships – Women's 400 metre individual medley =

The Women's 400m Individual Medley (IM) at the 2007 World Aquatics Championships took place on 1 April (prelims & finals) at the Rod Laver Arena in Melbourne, Australia. As the event was over 200 meters in length, no semifinals were held in it and the top 8 swimmers from the preliminary heats advance directly to the single final heat. 40 swimmers were entered in the event, of which 48 swam.

Existing records at the start of the event were:

- World Record (WR): 4:33.59, Yana Klochkova (Ukraine), 16 September 2000 in Sydney, Australia
- Championship Record (CR): 4:36.07, Katie Hoff (USA), Montreal 2005 (31 July 2005)

== Results ==
=== Finals ===
Place	Name	Nationality	Time	Note
1st	Katie Hoff	USA	4:32.89	WR; Splits: 29.83/1:03.91 1:39.49/2:14.10; 2:51.50/3:29.68 4:01.64/4:32.89
2nd	Yana Martynova	Russia	4:40.14	
3rd	Stephanie Rice	Australia	4:41.19	
4th	Jennifer Reilly	Australia	4:41.53	
5th	Ariana Kukors	USA	4:41.87	
6th	Yu Rui	China	4:44.49	
7th	Georgina Bardach	Argentina	4:45.61	
8th	Julie Hjorth-Hansen	Denmark	4:46.97	

=== Preliminaries ===
Rank	Swimmer	Nation	Time	Note
1	Katie Hoff	USA	4:38.21	Q
2	Jennifer Reilly	Australia	4:40.12	Q
3	Yana Martynova	Russia	4:42.65	Q
4	Ariana Kukors	USA	4:42.80	Q
5	Julie Hjorth-Hansen	Denmark	4:43.19	Q
6	Stephanie Rice	Australia	4:43.85	Q
7	Georgina Bardach	Argentina	4:43.88	Q
8	Yu Rui	China	4:44.34	Q
9	Helen Norfolk	New Zealand	4:44.79	
10	Nicole Hetzer	Germany	4:45.27	
11	Katinka Hosszú	Hungary	4:46.19	
12	Mireia Belmonte García	Spain	4:46.68	
13	Anja Klinar	Slovenia	4:49.64	
14	QI Hui	China	4:49.97	
15	Camille Muffat	France	4:50.22	
16	Hye Ra Choi	South Korea	4:52.75	
17	Sara Thydén	Sweden	4:53.69	
18	Maroua Mathlouthi	Tunisia	4:54.31	
19	Sophie de Ronchi	France	4:54.60	
20	Louise Mai Jansen	Denmark	4:55.51	
21	Ji Yeon Jung	South Korea	4:57.35	
22	Nimitta Thaveesupsoonthorn	Thailand	4:58.08	
23	Carmen Nam	Hong Kong	4:59.67	
24	Melanie Nocher	Ireland	4:59.82	
25	Ting Wen Quah	Singapore	5:01.59	
26	Man Hsu Lin	Chinese Taipei	5:02.90	
27	Yih Shiuan Chan	Macao	5:12.96	
28	Ranohon Amanova	Uzbekistan	5:17.97	
29	Maftunabonu Tuhtasinova	Uzbekistan	5:18.78	
30	Jonay Briedenhann	Namibia	5:21.89	
31	Marike Meyer	Namibia	5:24.37	
32	Madhavi Giri Govind	India	5:28.93	
33	Layla Alghul	Jordan	5:38.65	
34	Herinantenaina Ravoajanahary	Madagascar	5:42.24	
35	Hiba Bashouti	Jordan	5:47.28	
36	Tojohanitra; Andriamanjatoprimamama	Madagascar	5:48.31	
37	Sakina Ghulam	Pakistan	6:05.32	
--	Anna Khlistunova	Ukraine	DNS	
--	Alessia Filippi	Italy	DNS	
--	Kirsty Coventry	Zimbabwe	DQ	

== See also ==
- Swimming at the 2005 World Aquatics Championships – Women's 400 metre individual medley
- Swimming at the 2008 Summer Olympics – Women's 400 metre individual medley
- Swimming at the 2009 World Aquatics Championships – Women's 400 metre individual medley
