= 2004 NCAA Division I Women's Swimming and Diving Championships =

American college aquatic sports competition

- Host city: College Station, Texas
- Date: March 2004
- Venue(s): Student Recreation Center Natatorium; Texas A&M University

The 2004 NCAA Women's Division I Swimming and Diving Championships were contested at the 23rd annual NCAA-sanctioned swim meet to determine the team and individual national champions of Division I women's collegiate swimming and diving in the United States.

This year's events were hosted by Texas A&M University at the Student Recreation Center Natatorium in College Station, Texas.

Along with the 2000 edition, this was one of only two NCAA championship meets held in short course meters (25 m) rather than the NCAA's traditional short-course yards (25 yd) format. This allowed world records to be set at the competition.

Two-time defending champions Auburn again topped the team standings, finishing 138 points ahead of Georgia. This was the Tigers' third women's team title.

== Team standings ==
- Note: Top 10 only
- (H) = Hosts
- ^{(DC)} = Defending champions
- Full results

Rank	Team	Points
1st place, gold medalist(s)	Auburn ^{(DC)}	569
2nd place, silver medalist(s)	Georgia	431
3rd place, bronze medalist(s)	Arizona	369
4	Florida	253
5	Stanford	237
6	California	235 1/2
7	UCLA	195
8	Texas	169
9	USC	160
10	Wisconsin	135
16	Texas A&M (H)	100 1/2

== Swimming results ==
Event	Gold		Silver		Bronze	
50 m freestyle	Kara Lynn Joyce; Georgia	24.24	Eileen Coparropa; Auburn	24.41	Sara Platzer; UCLA	24.68
100 m freestyle	Kara Lynn Joyce; Georgia	53.15; US	Jennifer Van Assen; USC	54.38	Lacey Boutwell; Stanford	54.49
200 m freestyle	Margaret Hoelzer; Auburn	1:56.16	Jennifer Van Assen; USC	1:57.66	Jessi Perruquet; UNC	1:57.96
400 m freestyle	Emily Mason; Arizona	4:01.58	Kalyn Keller; USC	4:02.21	Sara McLarty; Florida	4:05.64
1500 m freestyle	Kalyn Keller; USC	15:49.14; AR	Rachael Burke; Virginia	15:55.27	Laura Conway; Georgia	16:00.70
100 m backstroke	Natalie Coughlin; California	57.51	Margaret Hoelzer; Auburn	58.54	Sarah Haupt; Penn State	59.45
200 m backstroke	Kirsty Coventry; Auburn	2:03.86	Margaret Hoelzer; Auburn	2:05.55	Natalie Coughlin; California	2:06.54
100 m breaststroke	Tara Kirk; Stanford	1:04.79; WR	Sarah Poewe; Georgia	1:06.02	Birte Steven; Oregon State	1:06.82
200 m breaststroke	Tara Kirk; Stanford	2:20.70; US, AR	Birte Steven; Oregon State	2:22.14	Vipa Bernhardt; Florida	2:23.69
100 m butterfly	Natalie Coughlin; California	56.88	Dana Kirk; Stanford	57.16	Mary DeScenza; Georgia	57.79
200 m butterfly	Mary DeScenza; Georgia	2:06.02	Kaitlin Sandeno; USC	2:06.07	Whitney Myers; Arizona	2:06.33
200 m IM	Kaitlin Sandeno; USC	2:08.11; US	Kirsty Coventry; Auburn	2:08.88	Whitney Myers; Arizona	2:10.23
400 m IM	Kaitlin Sandeno; USC	4:30.44; US, AR	Kirsty Coventry; Auburn	4:34.20	Emily Mason; Arizona	4:35.38
200 m freestyle relay	Georgia; Kara Lynn Joyce (24.24); Neka Mabry (24.45); Paige Kearns (24.34); Andrea Georoff (24.24)	1:37.27; US, AR	Auburn; Becky Short (24.81); Jenni Anderson (24.72); Jana Kolukanova (24.81); Eileen Coparropa (23.74)	1:38.08	Florida; Maureen Farrell (25.56); Chantal Gibney (25.01); Marietta Uhle (25.34); Jaime Ellis (24.69)	1:40.60
400 m freestyle relay	Georgia; Kara Lynn Joyce (53.46); Neka Mabry (53.52); Andrea Georoff (54.69); Mary DeScenza (53.47)	3:35.14; US, AR	Auburn; Eileen Coparropa (54.79); Margaret Hoelzer (53.57); Christina Swindle (54.44); Becky Short (53.70)	3:36.50	California; Natalie Coughlin (52.81) US, AR; Danielle Becks (55.97); Micha Burden (56.36); Laura Medina (55.17)	3:40.31
800 m freestyle relay	California; Natalie Coughlin (1:55.82); Erin Reilly (1:57.97); Ashley Chandler (1:58.60); Laura Medina (1:58.55)	7:50.94; US	Georgia; Samantha Arsenault (1:59.24); Kara Lynn Joyce (1:57.44); Julie Hardt (1:58.68); Mary DeScenza (1:57.96)	7:53.32	Arizona; Emily Mason (1:57.41); Jessica Hayes (1:59.08); Whitney Myers (1:57.67); Melissa Johnson (2:00.11)	7:54.27
200 m medley relay	Auburn; Jenni Anderson (27.94); Laura Swander (31.23); Margaret Hoelzer (25.67); Eileen Coparropa (24.18)	1:49.02; US	Georgia; Neka Mabry (27.98); Sarah Poewe (30.71); Mary DeScenza (26.44); Kara Lynn Joyce (24.07)	1:49.20	Stanford; Megan Baumgartner (28.63); Tara Kirk (29.74); Dana Kirk (26.29); Sarah Jones (25.14)	1:49.80
400 m medley relay	Georgia; Neka Mabry (1:00.17); Sarah Poewe (1:06.03); Mary DeScenza (57.19); Kara Lynn Joyce (53.09)	3:56.48; US	Stanford; Lacey Boutwell (1:01.08); Tara Kirk (1:04.09); Dana Kirk (57.10); Tami Ransom (55.73)	3:58.00	Arizona; Marshi Smith (59.65); Whitney Myers (1:07.05); Jessica Wagner (57.76); Jessica Hayes (54.72)	3:59.18

Legend: WR – World record; US – U.S. Open record; AR – American record;

== Diving results ==
Event	Gold		Silver		Bronze	
1 m diving	Allison Brennan; USC	307.20	Lane Bassham; Alabama	305.85	Meghan Perry-Eaton; Notre Dame	303.90
3 m diving	Lane Bassham; Alabama	557.75	Mandy Moran; Arkansas	541.95	Jessica Wantz; LSU	540.15
Platform diving	Nicole Pohorenec; Texas	482.20	Trisha Tumlinson; Arizona State	454.35	Alida DiPlacido; Texas A&M	435.30

== See also ==
- List of college swimming and diving teams
