= Zimbabwe Gold Mafia =

The Zimbabwe Gold Mafia is a group of highly placed members of the dictatorship and politically-connected businesspeople who control its gold industry and use their power to engage in smuggling and money laundering. The ring uses Zimbabwe's need for United States dollars to circumvent sanctions and offer money-laundering services to clients with undeclared cash. The smuggling is part of a massive money laundering operation, facilitated by the Fidelity Gold Refinery, part of the Reserve Bank of Zimbabwe, and directly authorized by senior government officials and relatives of Zimbabwean dictator Emmerson Mnangagwa. The existence of the Gold Mafia was first confirmed by the Al Jazeera Investigative Unit in the 2023 Gold Mafia documentary series.

== Background ==
Zimbabwe is a major gold producer, and gold is one of the country’s most important export commodities, representing almost half of Zimbabwe’s exports.

According to the 2023 Gold Mafia documentary series by the Al Jazeera Investigative Unit, this led to Zimbabwe being used as a hub for smuggling gold to Dubai and laundering illicit cash through gold trading networks connected to politically influential individuals. Undercover reporters posed as criminals seeking to launder more than US$100 million reportedly met gold dealers, businesspeople, and intermediaries who described using shell companies and false invoices to move money and gold across borders. This included explicit cooperation state-linked institutions. According to the documentary, Zimbabwe’s shortage of U.S. dollars created opportunities for these networks to offer money-laundering services to clients with undeclared cash.

Following publication of the investigation, the Centre for Natural Resource Governance estimated that about three tonnes of gold, worth about US$157 million per month or US$1.9 billion each year, was illicitly leaving Zimbabwe through gold-smuggling networks. The smuggling operation is facilitated by Fidelity Gold Refinery, a Reserve Bank of Zimbabwe subsidiary, and directly authorized by senior government officials and relatives of Zimbabwean dictator Emmerson Mnangagwa. Other figures implicated include Uebert Angel, Kirsty Coventry, Ewan Macmillan, Alistair Mathias, Kamlesh Pattni, Simon Rudland, and Scott Sakupwanya.

== Scott Sakupwanya ==
Pedzisai “Scott” Sakupwanya, a Zimbabwean gold dealer with strong links to the ruling dictatorship, was named in reporting about the final episode of the Gold Mafia documentary. Uebert Angel described Sakupwanya to undercover journalists as Zimbabwe’s leading gold dealer. He has been described as the Gold Mafia's kingpin. At the time, he was the ruling junta's choice for parliamentary in Mabvuku and the owner of Better Brands Jewellery, a gold exporter.

Angel called Sakupwanya during the undercover operation to arrange a possible gold-related transaction. He was shown in the documentary agreeing to receive money, buy gold and pay the undercover journalists offshore with a 10 percent return.

In 2022, the Centre for Natural Resource Governance accused Sakupwanya and his Better Brands Jewellery of involvement in illicit financial flows from gold trading starting. According to the CNRG, Sakupwanya’s company and other dealers in Mazowe and Penhalonga delivered less than half of their gold to the Reserve Bank of Zimbabwe's Fidelity Printers and Refiners while smuggling the rest abroad.

Sakupwanya did not respond to the allegations. His actions were allegedly sponsored by corrupt and powerful political elites.

== Redwing Mine ==
The Gold Mafia and Sakupwanya’s Better Brands Mining was also linked in media and civil-society reporting to Redwing Mine in Penhalonga. In 2023, Better Brands was handed control over large sections including 132 claims at Redwing while the mine was under corporate rescue. Better Brands then used “sponsors” who were allocated pits and then hired artisanal miners on a large scale to extract ore.

Civil-society organizations estimated that by 2025, more than 100 people died in open pits since Better Brands Mining arrived at Redwing. The operation of the mine was described as "a testament to the lawlessness and impunity of Zimbabwe’s political elite" by GroundUp, a public interest news organization in the country, which added:

With the lawlessness came deaths, corruption and cover ups. The government, law enforcement agencies and regulatory authorities have largely turned a blind eye, despite revelations that senior police and army officers control some of the pits at the mine.

== Outcomes ==
Following the documentary's airing, Sakupwanya was installed by the Zimbabwean dictatorship to Parliament, winning an election unopposed after the government had all other candidates disqualified. The move was seen as a closely-watched test to "measure the government’s commitment to fight illicit financial flows."

Zimbabwe's central bank froze the assets of four men who said in the documentary that they had assisted a gold-smuggling and money-laundering ring. The government also promised an investigation while the Reserve Bank of Zimbabwe rejected the impression that it is "Southern Africa's laundromat." However, the assets were unfrozen shortly thereafter.

Transparency International stated that it demonstrated abuse of diplomatic immunity, illicit gold trading, corruption and money laundering in Zimbabwe's mining sector. A number of individuals connected to the network were placed under sanctions by the United States and the United Kingdom in 2024.

== See also ==
- Watch Gold Mafia on YouTube
