= Rudland =

Rudland is a surname of English origin. Notable people with the surname include:

- Hans Kristian Rudland (born 1997), Norwegian racing cyclist
- Joshua Rudland (born 2003), New Zealand footballer
- Simon Rudland (born 1971), Zimbabwean businessman
- William David Rudland (1839–1912), British Christian Evangelist
