= Juan Antonio Samaranch Salisachs =

Spanish sports executive (born 1959)

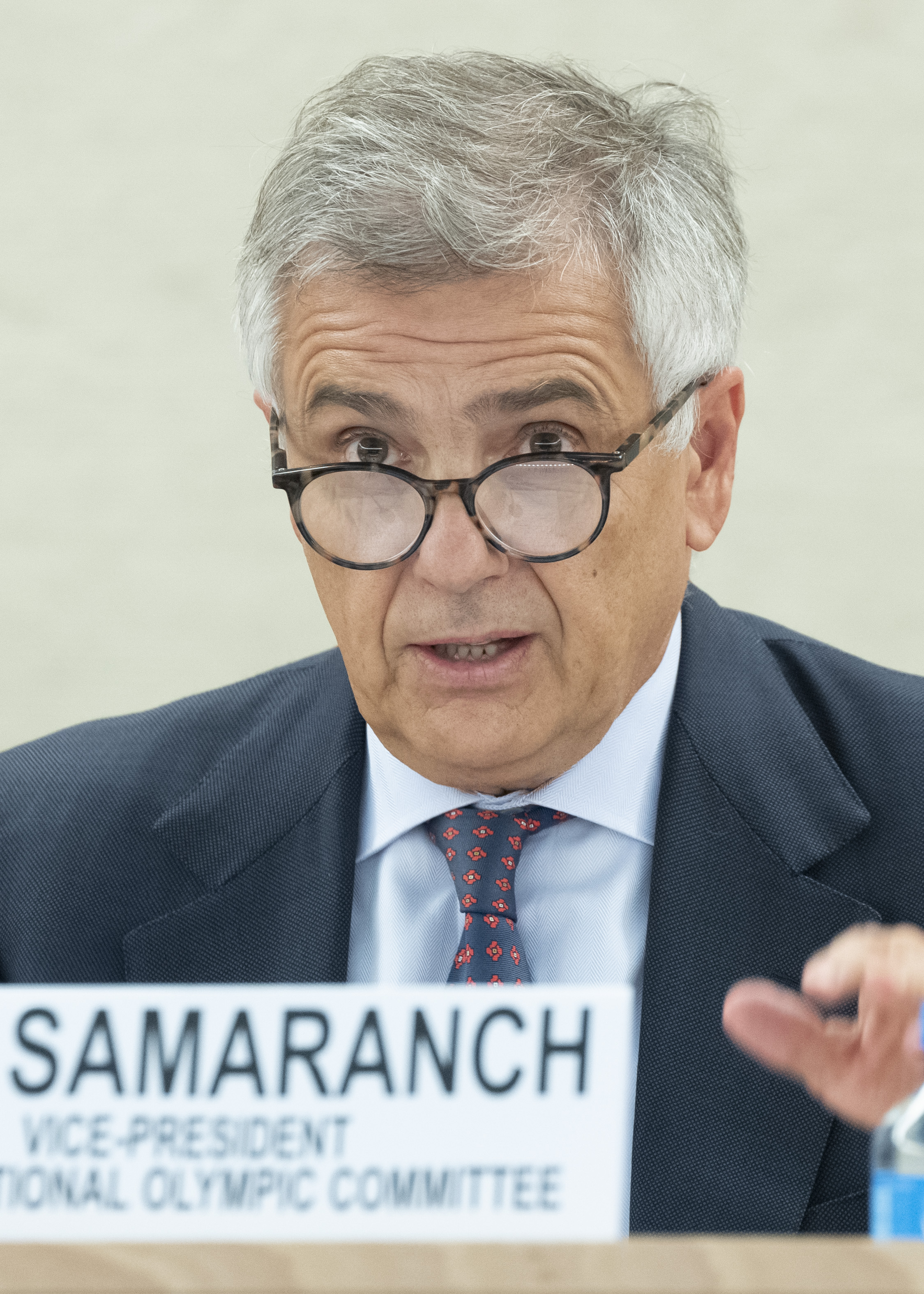
- Samaranch in 2018
- Born: November 1, 1959 (age 66); Barcelona, Spain
- Education: University of Barcelona; New York University
- Occupations: Sports executive, financial analyst
- Spouse: Cristina Bigelli
- Children: 4
- Parent: Juan Antonio Samaranch (father)

Juan Antonio Samaranch Salisachs (born 1 November 1959) is a Spanish sports executive and financial analyst who currently serves as the vice president of the International Olympic Committee (IOC). He is the son of former IOC president Juan Antonio Samaranch.

== Early life ==
Samaranch was born on 1 November 1959 in Barcelona, Spain, the only son of María Teresa Salisachs and Juan Antonio Samaranch. He has one sister, María Teresa. His father was Minister of Sports under Franco from 1967 to 1971 and president of the IOC from 1980 to 2001. The family spent some time living in Moscow, Soviet Union while Samaranch the elder served as a diplomat following the Spanish transition to democracy. Samaranch attended University of Barcelona, where he studied industrial engineering, and earned his MBA from New York University (NYU) in 1986. He previously served as the regional leader for NYU's Stern School of Business alumni group in Spain.

== Career ==
Before earning his MBA, Samaranch worked as a perfume salesman for International Flavors & Fragrances for two and a half years. After graduating from NYU in 1986, he worked for three years as an associate at First Boston Corporation in New York, then served as a partner and as the vice president of corporate finance for S. G. Warburg & Co. in London. In 1991, he co-founded GBS Finanzas. In 1996, he became vice president of the Union Internationale de Pentathlon Moderne (UIPM) and in 2001, the same year his father retired, was elected as a member of the IOC. He served on the Organizing Committees for the 2006 Winter Olympics in Turin, Italy and the 2014 Winter Olympics in Sochi, Russia. In 2015, Samaranch was appointed president of the Summit Shopping, Tourism and Economy committee, which focused on increasing the "number of quality visitors and tourists in Spain and Madrid." He was elected vice president of the IOC in 2016, where he served on the Oswald Commission, which made decisions about Russian athletes following the Summer Olympics doping scandal. He finished his four year term as VP of IOC in 2020.

Samaranch established the Samaranch Foundation in Beijing, China in 2012 in honor of his late father. The organization "aims to promote sport in China" and encourages good relations between China and Spain. Initial funding came from the Samaranch family, IOC, Chinese Olympic Committee, Beijing Olympic City Development Association, Spanish government, Barcelona's government, Anta Sports, Samsung China, Tibet Spring, China Post, Beijing Tourism Group, Taishan Sports, and La Caixa.

In February 2013, the IOC voted to eliminate one sport from the Olympics. Although many experts predicted that the pentathlon would be removed due to its low popularity, and despite having a larger athlete and fan base, wrestling was removed instead due to doping cases. This rule was about to start at the 2020 Summer Olympics. Samaranch was largely regarded as a major player in the decision, in part because of his conflict of interest with the UIPM, which would be damaged with the elimination of the pentathlon. By September, wrestling had been reinstated on grounds of its long history at the Olympics.

In 2019, Samaranch received an honorary doctorate from Handong Global University in South Korea. As of 2022, Samaranch had been reelected as the IOC vice president, was on the IOC's Board of Directors, was a member of the Spanish Olympic Committee, and was chairman of the Organizing Committee for Beijing 2022. In 2020, Samaranch was firm in his belief that the Olympics should continue regardless of the COVID-19 pandemic, albeit with necessary restrictions and precautions, even if the vaccine did not become available before the event. Historically, Samaranch supported the candidacy of Madrid as the host of the 2016 Summer Olympics as well as Beijing for the 2022 Winter Olympics despite experts' assertions that it would be the "most unsustainable games of all time" due to the amount of artificial snow needed. He was also a major proponent of holding the 2030 Winter Olympics in Barcelona-Pyrenees but the bid was officially pulled in June 2022 due to a lack of agreement between the governments of Aragon and Catalonia. In September 2024, he was announced as one of seven candidates in the running to succeed Thomas Bach as IOC president. He received 28 votes at the 144th IOC Session in March 2025, with Kirsty Coventry winning the election.

== Personal life ==
Samaranch is married to Italian socialite Cristina Bigelli and together they have four children. Alessia is married to French financier Hadrien Forterre. Samaranch speaks Spanish, Catalan, Italian, French, and English. He and his family live in Madrid.
