= Swimming at the 1999 Pan American Games – Women's 400 metre freestyle =

Women's 400 metre freestyle at the 1999 Pan American Games
- Venue: Pan Am Pool
- Dates: August 4 (preliminaries and finals)
- Competitors: from - nations

Medalists
| Gold medal | Kaitlin Sandeno | United States |
| Silver medal | Janelle Atkinson | Jamaica |
| Bronze medal | Joanne Malar | Canada |

The women's 400 metre freestyle competition of the swimming events at the 1999 Pan American Games took place on 4 August at the Pan Am Pool. The last Pan American Games champion was Brooke Bennett of US.

This race consisted of eight lengths of the pool, with all eight being in the freestyle stroke.

== Results ==
All times are in minutes and seconds.

| KEY: | q | Fastest non-qualifiers | Q | Qualified | GR | Games record | NR | National record | PB | Personal best | SB | Seasonal best |

=== Heats ===
The first round was held on August 4.

| Rank | Name | Nationality | Time | Notes |
|---|---|---|---|---|
| 1 | Janelle Atkinson | Jamaica | 4:16.89 | Q |
| 2 | - | - | - | Q |
| 3 | Kaitlin Sandeno | United States | 4:18.97 | Q |
| 4 | Julia Stowers | United States | 4:19.84 | Q |
| 5 | - | - | - | Q |
| 6 | - | - | - | Q |
| 7 | - | - | - | Q |
| 8 | - | - | - | Q |

=== B Final ===
The B final was held on August 4.

| Rank | Name | Nationality | Time | Notes |
|---|---|---|---|---|
| 9 | Gretchen Gotay | Puerto Rico | 4:35.70 | |
| 10 | Natalie Crump | Barbados | 4:38.83 | |

=== A Final ===
The A final was held on August 4.

| Rank | Name | Nationality | Time | Notes |
|---|---|---|---|---|
| 1st place, gold medalist(s) | Kaitlin Sandeno | United States | 4:10.74 | |
| 2nd place, silver medalist(s) | Janelle Atkinson | Jamaica | 4:10.83 | |
| 3rd place, bronze medalist(s) | Joanne Malar | Canada | 4:12.64 | |
| 4 | Julia Stowers | United States | 4:16.79 | |
| 5 | Ana Muniz | Brazil | 4:19.47 | |
| 6 | Nayara Ribeiro | Brazil | 4:19.75 | |
| 7 | Patricia Villarreal | Mexico | 4:24.66 | |
| 8 | Michelle Diago Jensen | Puerto Rico | 4:25.18 | |
