= David Lappartient =

French politician

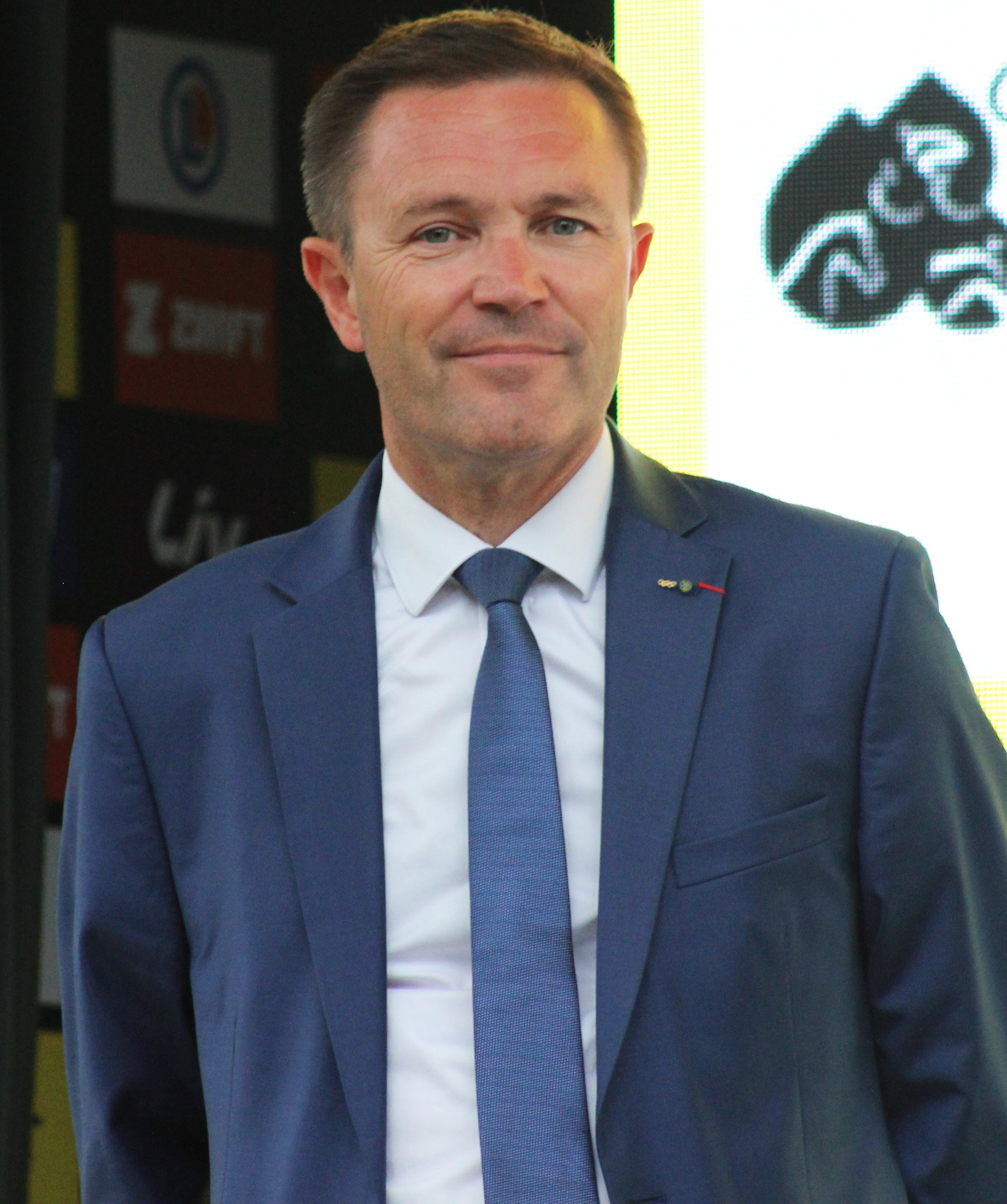
- Lappartient in 2025

President of the Union Cycliste Internationale
- Incumbent
- Assumed office 21 September 2017
- Preceded by: Brian Cookson

President of the Comité National Olympique et Sportif Français
- In office 29 June 2023 – 19 June 2025
- Preceded by: Brigitte Henriques
- Succeeded by: Amélie Oudéa-Castéra

Personal details
- Born: 31 May 1973 (age 52) Pontivy, France

David Lappartient (born 31 May 1973) is a French politician, sporting administrator and the president of the Union Cycliste Internationale (UCI).

== Sports administration ==
In 2009, Lappartient was elected president of the French Cycling Federation. In 2013, he was elected president of the European Cycling Union.

In September 2017, Lappartient was elected president of the UCI at the 2017 UCI Road World Championships, beating existing president Brian Cookson 45 votes to 8. Lappartient promised to ban the use of corticosteroids outside of competition, as well as ensuring that "technological fraud" does not occur. Lappartient resigned from both the French Cycling Federation and the European Cycling Union following his election. In 2021 and 2025, he was reelected unopposed as UCI president.

In February 2022 he was elected to serve an eight-year term as a member of the International Olympic Committee. In June 2023, he became president of the French National Olympic and Sports Committee, leaving the role in June 2025. In September 2024, he was announced as one of seven candidates in the running to succeed Thomas Bach as IOC president. He received four votes at the 144th IOC Session in March 2025, with Kirsty Coventry winning the election.

== Politics ==
In July 2021, Lappartient was elected president of the Morbihan departmental council, the assembly governing the Morbihan department in Brittany. Lappartient was previously been mayor of the town of Sarzeau between 2008 and 2021.
