= Zvigananda =

Term in Zimbabwean political discourse

Zvigananda is a term used in Zimbabwean political discourse to describe a small group of politically connected individuals who accumulate substantial wealth through corrupt practices and state patronage. The term was notably employed by Zimbabwean Vice President Constantino Chiwenga to highlight the economic disparity between these elites and the limited financial support provided to war veterans. Blessed Geza, who led protests against Zimbabwean dictator Emmerson Mnangagwa, has labeled Scott Sakupwanya, Wicknell Chivayo and Kudakwashe Tagwirei as examples of Zvigananda businessmen who are widely believed to be corrupt.

== Etymology ==
The term "Zvigananda" is derived from Shona, a Bantu language widely spoken in Zimbabwe. While its precise etymology in this context is unclear, "zviga" can imply something small or insignificant, and "nanda" may relate to wealth or abundance, possibly suggesting a critique of a small group hoarding vast riches. The term gained prominence in 2025 political rhetoric in Zimbabwe.

Munyaradzi Machacha, the Zanu PF National Political Commissar, defined "zvigananda" (or "chigananda") as a term synonymous with "bourgeois." Speaking at a Zanu PF provincial coordinating committee meeting in Masvingo in April 2025, he explained that a chigananda, or bourgeois, refers to a person who controls the means of production, such as land, and uses it to generate profit. Machacha addressed accusations that he was part of a "zvigananda cabal" within the party, dismissing the criticism by asserting there was nothing wrong with being bourgeois, as it aligned with the Zanu PF constitution.tion of the bourgeoisie as a class that owns and profits from production.

== Background ==
The concept of Zvigananda emerged amid discussions of economic inequality and corruption in Zimbabwe, particularly under Mnangagwa’s presidency (2017–present). In a speech addressing the launch of the Presidential War Veterans Fund, Vice President Chiwenga criticized the allocation of $1.5 million USD to support an estimated 200,000 surviving war veterans—equating to approximately $7.50 USD per person—while pointing out that the Zvigananda amass "millions, if not billions, of dollars" through corrupt deals involving state resources.

The Presidential War Veterans Fund was intended to provide financial support to veterans of Zimbabwe’s liberation struggle, with specific allocations such as $150,000 USD to Masvingo Province and $100,000 USD to Mashonaland East. However, Chiwenga and other critics argue that these amounts are insufficient, especially when juxtaposed with the wealth of the Zvigananda, who are often linked to lavish expenditures like purchasing luxury vehicles for government officials.

War veterans have historically faced economic hardship despite their role in Zimbabwe’s independence. Previous support efforts, such as payouts in the late 1990s, were marred by corruption, with funds often diverted by those in power. The disparity highlighted by the Zvigananda term has fueled public discontent, with some describing the treatment of war veterans as an "insult" to the nation.
