= 144th IOC Session =

IOC Session in Costa Navarino, Pylos, Greece

2025 IOC presidential election
- 20 March 2025
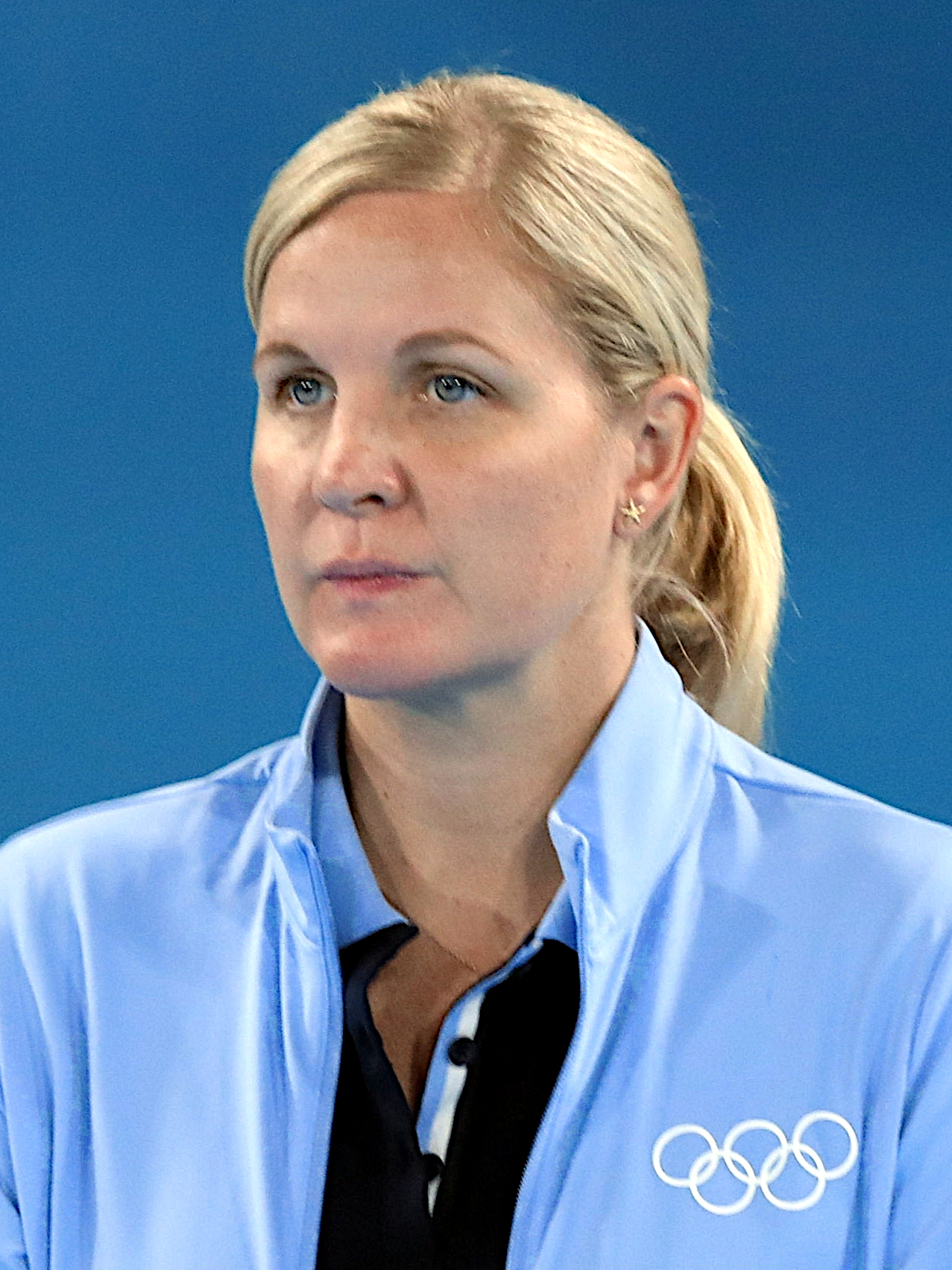

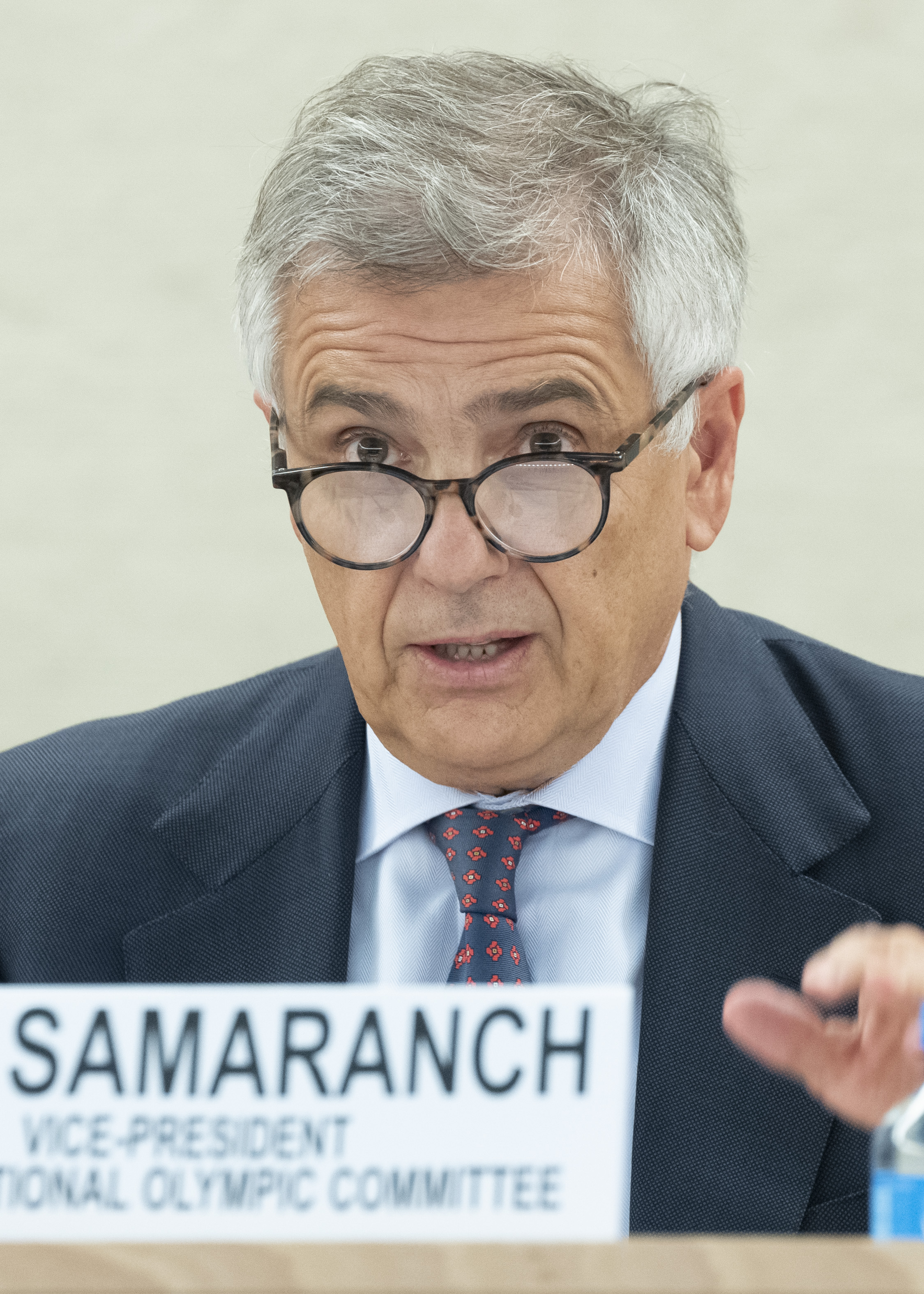

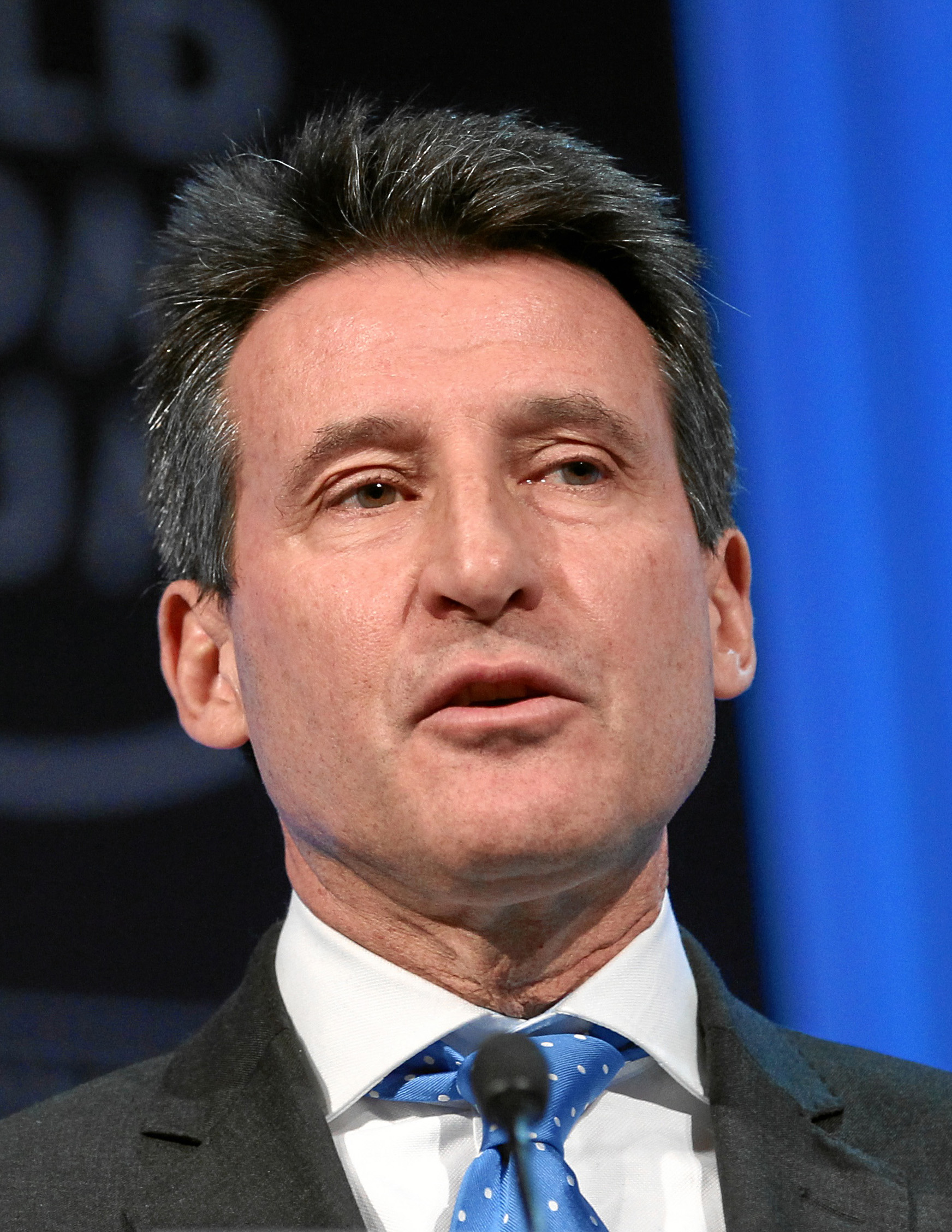

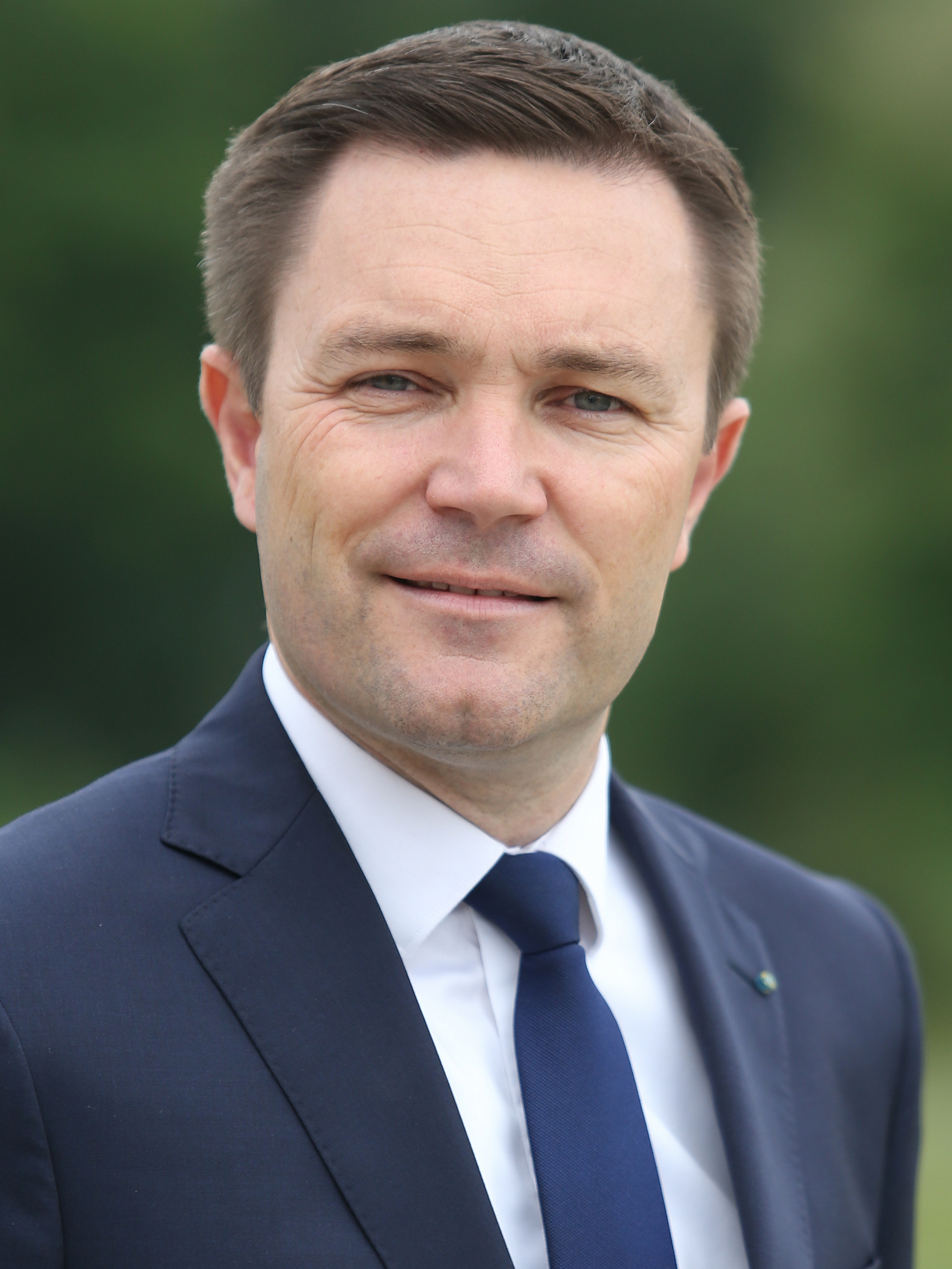

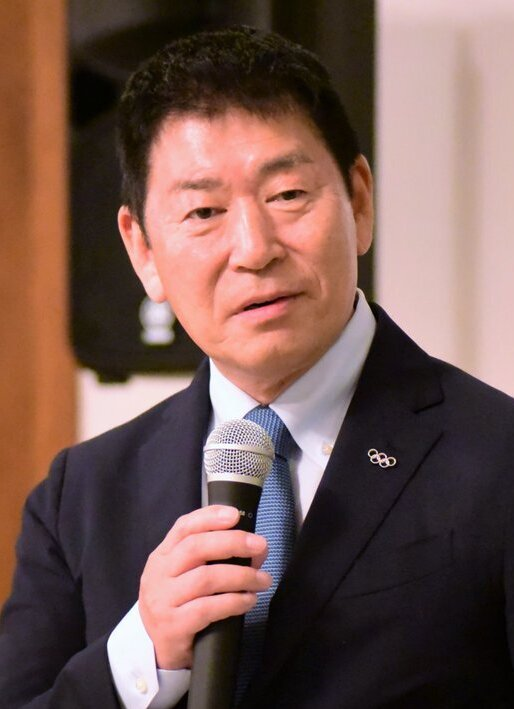

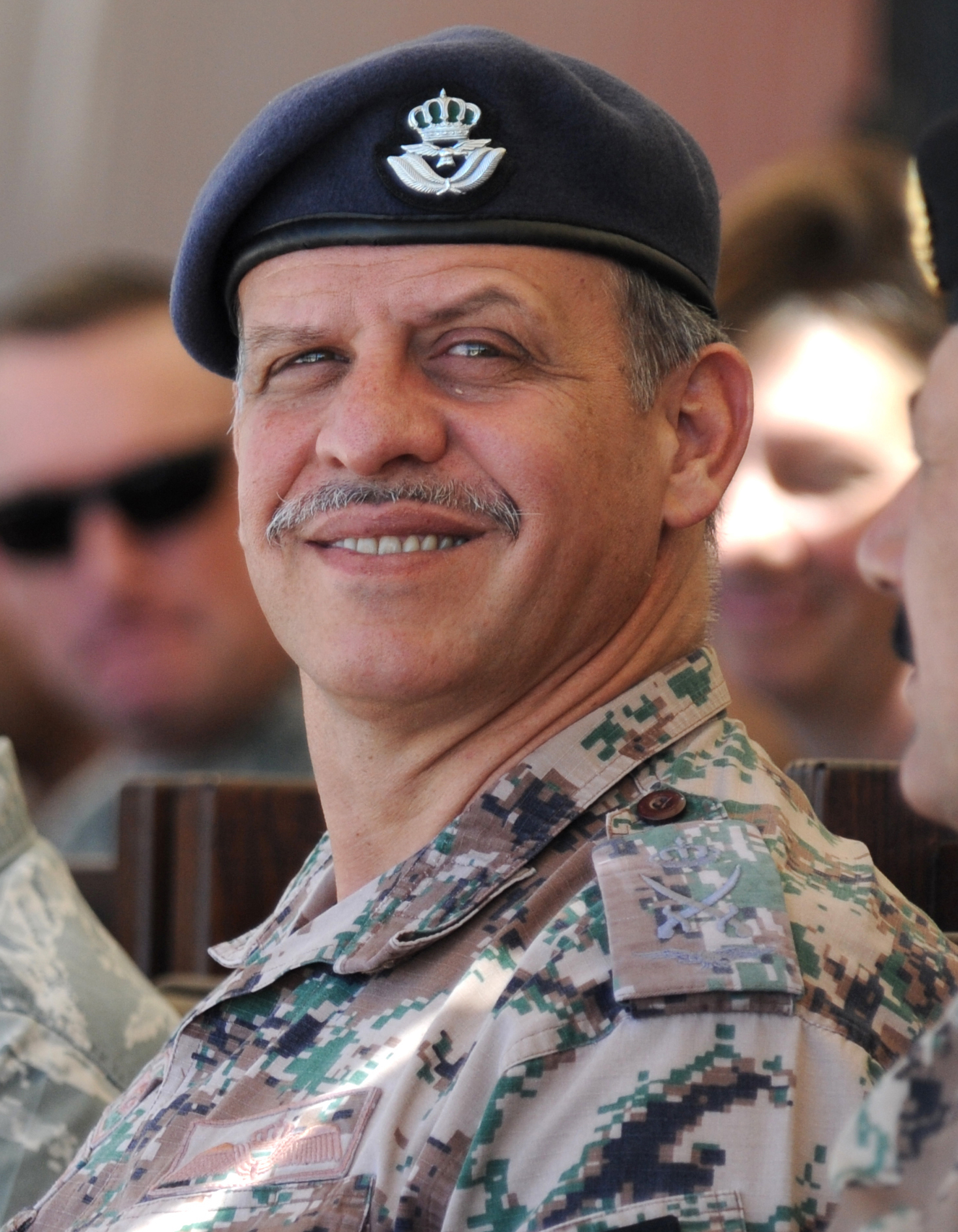

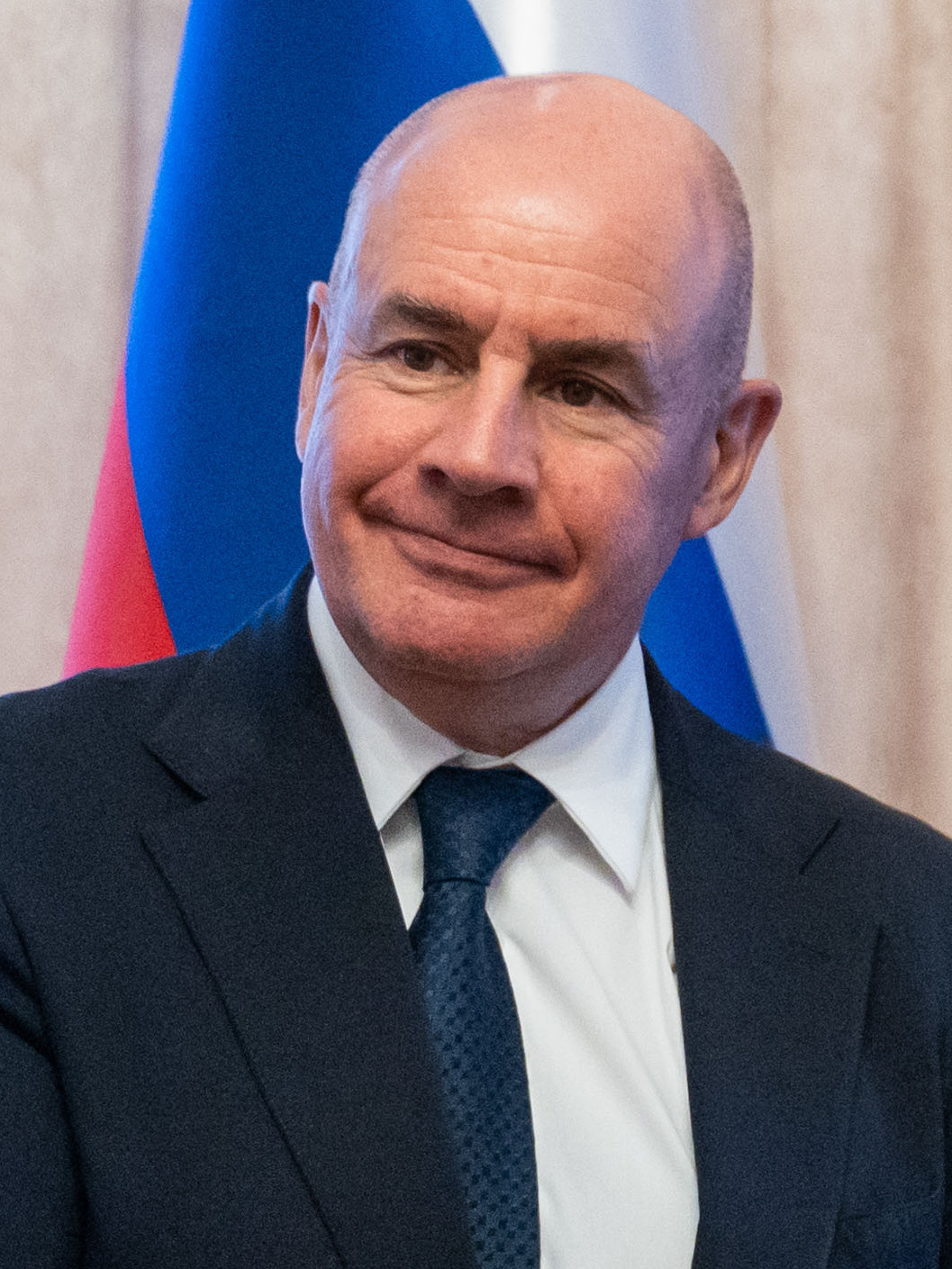
Candidate	Kirsty Coventry	Juan Antonio Samaranch Salisachs	Sebastian Coe
Home state	Zimbabwe	Spain	Great Britain
IOC vote	49	28	8
Candidate	David Lappartient	Morinari Watanabe	Prince Faisal bin Hussein
Home state	France	Japan	Jordan
IOC vote	4	4	2
Candidate	Johan Eliasch
Home state	Great Britain
IOC vote	2
President before election
(Germany) Thomas Bach
Elected President
(Zimbabwe) Kirsty Coventry

The 144th IOC Session was held in Costa Navarino, Pylos, Greece, from 18 to 21 March 2025. At this session, Zimbabwean former Olympic swimmer Kirsty Coventry was elected as the tenth President of the International Olympic Committee, becoming the first woman and the first African to hold the position and succeeding the ninth President, German Thomas Bach.

Greece was originally selected to host the 137th IOC Session that was due to take place in 2021, however, COVID-19 travel restrictions forced the session to be held virtually.

The Session itself took place in the House of Events at the Costa Navarino resort in Pylos, while the Opening Ceremony performances took place in Ancient Olympia.

== IOC presidential election ==
Thomas Bach, who is term-limited as President of the International Olympic Committee, concluded his tenure as president at this session. Bach was elected president at the 125th IOC Session in Buenos Aires in 2013. The tenth IOC President, Kirsty Coventry, was elected at this session.

=== Candidates ===
On 16 September 2024, the IOC announced that the following candidates will run for the presidency:

- (Jordan) Prince Faisal bin Hussein – IOC Member since 2010, brother of King Abdullah II, and Member of the IOC Executive Board
- (United Kingdom) Sebastian Coe – IOC member since 2020, President of World Athletics, President of the London Organising Committee of the Olympic and Paralympic Games, and Olympic champion in middle-distance running (Moscow 1980 and Los Angeles 1984)
- Kirsty Coventry – IOC member since 2013, Minister of Youth, Sport, Arts and Recreation in Zimbabwe, Olympic champion in swimming (Athens 2004 and Beijing 2008), and Member of the IOC Executive Board
- (United Kingdom) Johan Eliasch – IOC Member since 2024, President of the International Ski and Snowboard Federation, and environmental activist
- (France) David Lappartient – IOC Member since 2022, President of The International Cycling Union, President of the French National Olympic and Sports Committee and Chair of the IOC Esports Commission
- (Spain) Juan Antonio Samaranch Salisachs – IOC member since 2001, son of former IOC President Juan Antonio Samaranch, financial analyst, and IOC Vice President
- (Japan) Morinari Watanabe – IOC member since 2018, Member of the Tokyo 2020 Organizing Committee, and President of the International Gymnastics Federation

=== Results ===
Election of the 10th IOC President
Candidate	Round 1
(Zimbabwe) Kirsty Coventry	49
(Spain) Juan Antonio Samaranch Salisachs	28
(United Kingdom) Sebastian Coe	8
(France) David Lappartient	4
(Japan) Morinari Watanabe	4
(United Kingdom) Johan Eliasch	2
(Jordan) Prince Faisal bin Hussein	2

Having received an absolute majority in the first-round of elimination voting, Coventry became the first woman to hold the IOC Presidency, the youngest, and the first African to do so.

== Boxing inclusion in the 2028 Summer Olympics ==
During the session, boxing was officially included in the sports program for the 2028 Summer Olympics in Los Angeles, despite the IOC's suspension of the International Boxing Association (IBA) due to concerns over governance and financial management. The events will now be sponsored by World Boxing, a new governing body replacing the IBA.

Previously, President of the International Olympic Committee Thomas Bach had announced that boxing's inclusion would be decided at some point in 2025.

== See also ==
- List of IOC meetings
- 125th IOC Session
- 2026 Winter Olympics
- 2028 Summer Olympics
- Zimbabwe at the Olympics
