= Morinari Watanabe =

President of the Fédération Internationale de Gymnastique

- 渡邊守成
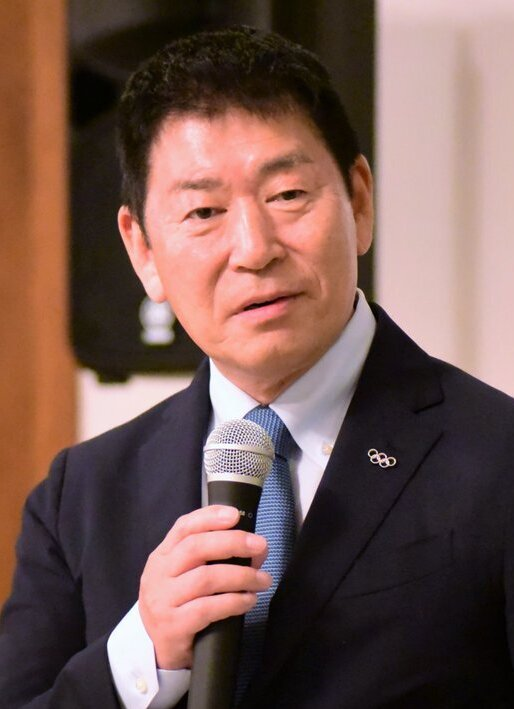
- Watanabe in 2024
- Born: 21 February 1959 (age 67); Kitakyushu, Fukuoka Prefecture, Japan
- Education: Tokai University (BPE); Tokai University (MA)
- Occupation: Businessman

Morinari Watanabe (渡邊守成, Watanabe Morinari; born 21 February 1959) is a Japanese businessman who has served as president of the Fédération Internationale de Gymnastique since January 2017. Prior to his election in October 2016, he served as general-secretary of the Japan Gymnastics Association (2009–16) and was on multiple committees with the Japanese Olympic Committee.

Watanabe is the ninth president of the FIG and its first Asian president. In October 2018, the International Olympic Committee elected him as a new member. He was also appointed an executive board member of Tokyo 2020. In September 2024, he was announced as one of seven candidates in the running to succeed Thomas Bach as IOC president. During the 144th IOC Session in March 2025, he got four votes, with Kirsty Coventry winning the election.

Watanabe has faced criticism for his decisions regarding Russian athletes tied to the war in Ukraine. In March 2025, he was filmed embracing Nikita Nagorny, a Russian gymnast sanctioned by the UK, EU, and United States and a prominent supporter of the war, during a visit to Moscow. The International Gymnastics Federation (FIG) permitted Russian athletes with documented pro-war ties, including Angelina Melnikova, to compete under neutral status. In May 2026, Watanabe lifted all remaining restrictions on Russian and Belarusian athletes entirely.

Sporting positions
Preceded by Bruno Grandi	President of the International Gymnastics Federation; 2017–present	Incumbent
