= Swimming at the 2009 World Aquatics Championships – Women's 200 metre backstroke =

The heats for the women's 200 m backstroke race at the 2009 World Championships took place in the morning and evening of 31 July, with the final in the evening session of 1 August at the Foro Italico in Rome, Italy.

== Records ==
Prior to this competition, the existing world and competition records were as follows:

World record	Kirsty Coventry (ZIM)	2:05.24	Beijing, China	16 August 2008
Championship record	Margaret Hoelzer (USA)	2:07.16	Melbourne, Australia	31 March 2007

The following records were established during the competition:

Date	Round	Name	Nationality	Time	Record
31 July	Heat 6	Kirsty Coventry	Zimbabwe	2:06.72	CR
31 July	Semifinal 2	Kirsty Coventry	Zimbabwe	2:05.86	CR
1 August	Final	Kirsty Coventry	Zimbabwe	2:04.81	WR

== Results ==
=== Heats ===
Rank	Name	Nationality	Time	Heat	Lane	Notes
1	Kirsty Coventry	Zimbabwe	2:06.72	6	4	CR
2	Gemma Spofforth	Great Britain	2:07.69	7	5	
3	Elizabeth Beisel	USA	2:07.98	7	4	
4	Belinda Hocking	Australia	2:08.07	6	3	
5	Anastasia Zuyeva	Russia	2:08.11	5	5	
6	Alexianne Castel	France	2:08.96	5	4	
7	Elizabeth Pelton	USA	2:09.12	7	6	
8	Alicja Tchórz	Poland	2:09.74	7	7	NR
9	Lauren Lavigna	Canada	2:10.03	7	8	NR
10	Tomoyo Fukuda	Japan	2:10.15	5	6	
11	Pernille Jessing Larsen	Denmark	2:10.27	5	2	NR
12	Elizabeth Simmonds	Great Britain	2:10.31	5	3	
13	Daryna Zevina	Ukraine	2:10.41	6	0	
14	Aya Terakawa	Japan	2:10.90	6	6	
15	Simona Baumrtova	Czech Republic	2:11.08	5	7	
16	Sophie Edington	Australia	2:11.53	6	7	
17	Zsuzsanna Jakabos	Hungary	2:11.75	6	9	
18	Bai Anqi	China	2:12.26	6	2	
19	Kseniya Grygorenko	Ukraine	2:12.40	5	9	
20	Fernanda González	Mexico	2:12.68	5	8	NR
21	Barbara Jardin	Canada	2:13.02	7	1	
22	Melanie Nocher	Ireland	2:13.04	4	3	
23	Klaudia Nazieblo	Poland	2:13.42	5	1	
24	Valentina Lucconi	Italy	2:14.21	6	8	
25	Dina Hegazy	Egypt	2:14.76	6	1	
26	Cloe Credeville	France	2:15.36	7	2	
27	Lourdes Villasenor	Mexico	2:15.52	4	2	
28	Anna Volchkov	Israel	2:15.61	3	4	
29	Zhao Jing	China	2:15.67	6	5	
30	Lau Yin Yan Claudia	Hong Kong	2:15.68	4	9	
31	Lenka Jarosova	Czech Republic	2:15.79	4	4	
32	Jessica Pengelly	South Africa	2:16.06	5	0	
33	Kang Yeong Seo	South Korea	2:16.59	4	5	
34	Martina van Berkel	Switzerland	2:17.05	7	9	
35	Kiera Aitken	Bermuda	2:17.49	4	0	
36	Ekaterina Avramova	Bulgaria	2:17.61	4	1	
37	Anna-Liisa Põld	Estonia	2:17.82	4	7	
38	Nicole Marmol	Ecuador	2:18.03	3	6	
39	Nina Rangelova	Bulgaria	2:18.47	1	0	
40	Anastasiya Prilepa	Kazakhstan	2:18.51	3	8	
41	Yekaterina Rudenko	Kazakhstan	2:19.04	3	3	
41	Dana Gales	Luxembourg	2:19.04	3	0	
43	Chen Ting	Chinese Taipei	2:19.08	4	8	
44	Elimar Barrios	Venezuela	2:19.40	2	5	
45	Erika Stewart	Colombia	2:19.48	3	9	
46	Kätlin Sepp	Estonia	2:19.65	3	1	
47	Sarah Rolko	Luxembourg	2:19.71	4	6	
48	Ramirez Monica	Andorra	2:20.39	2	7	
49	Diana Chang	Ecuador	2:20.41	2	2	
50	Juanita Barreto Barreto	Colombia	2:20.70	3	2	
51	Aleksandra Kovaleva	Belarus	2:21.67	3	5	
52	Maria Virginia Baez Franco	Paraguay	2:22.45	2	3	
53	Lim Shana Jia Yi	Singapore	2:22.65	3	7	
54	Kirsten Lapham	Zimbabwe	2:23.60	2	6	
55	Rebecca Sharpe	Bermuda	2:28.90	2	4	
56	Karen Vilorio	Honduras	2:29.28	1	5	
57	Mariana Zaballa	Bolivia	2:29.80	2	9	
58	Fong Man Wai	Macau	2:32.06	2	8	
59	Sophia Noel	Grenada	2:33.66	1	6	
60	Ayesha Noel	Grenada	2:35.49	1	3	
61	Nicol Cremona	Malta	2:35.69	2	1	
62	Che Lok In	Macau	2:36.66	2	0	
63	Birita Debes	Faroe Islands	2:36.89	1	2	
64	Danielle Bernadine Findlay	Zambia	2:42.73	1	1	
65	Ruth Carvalho	Angola	2:44.91	1	7	
66	Mahnoor Maqsood	Pakistan	3:01.14	1	8	
–	Sanja Jovanović	Croatia	DNS	7	0	
–	Alessia Filippi	Italy	DNS	7	3	
–	Rachael Catherine Glenister	American Samoa	DSQ	1	4	

=== Semifinals ===
Rank	Name	Nationality	Time	Heat	Lane	Notes
1	Kirsty Coventry	Zimbabwe	2:05.86	2	4	CR
2	Anastasia Zuyeva	Russia	2:07.00	2	3	NR
3	Elizabeth Simmonds	Great Britain	2:07.21	1	7	NR
4	Elizabeth Beisel	USA	2:07.48	2	5	
5	Gemma Spofforth	Great Britain	2:07.64	1	4	
6	Aya Terakawa	Japan	2:08.49	1	1	
7	Alexianne Castel	France	2:08.77	1	3	
8	Elizabeth Pelton	USA	2:09.57	2	6	
9	Belinda Hocking	Australia	2:09.77	1	5	
10	Tomoyo Fukuda	Japan	2:10.09	1	2	
11	Pernille Jessing Larsen	Denmark	2:10.35	2	7	
12	Lauren Lavigna	Canada	2:10.54	2	2	
13	Sophie Edington	Australia	2:10.57	1	8	
14	Daryna Zevina	Ukraine	2:10.58	2	1	
15	Simona Baumrtova	Czech Republic	2:10.79	2	8	NR
16	Alicja Tchórz	Poland	2:11.06	1	6	

=== Final ===
Rank	Name	Nationality	Time	Lane	Notes
1st place, gold medalist(s)	Kirsty Coventry	Zimbabwe	2:04.81	4	WR
2nd place, silver medalist(s)	Anastasia Zuyeva	Russia	2:04.94	5	ER
3rd place, bronze medalist(s)	Elizabeth Beisel	United States	2:06.39	6	
4	Gemma Spofforth	Great Britain	2:06.66	2	NR
5	Elizabeth Simmonds	Great Britain	2:07.98	3	
6	Elizabeth Pelton	United States	2:08.04	8	
7	Alexianne Castel	France	2:08.13	1	
8	Aya Terakawa	Japan	2:08.89	7	
