= Kirsty Coventry =

President of the IOC since 2025

Her Excellency Kirsty Coventry OLY
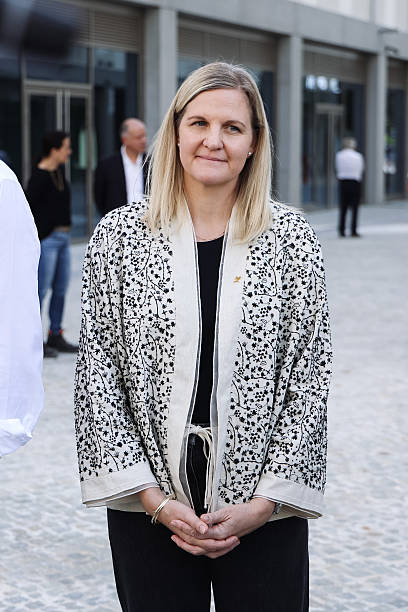
- Kirsty Coventry at the institutional visit to the Olympic Village of the XXV Olympic and Paralympic Winter Games Milano Cortina 2026

10th President of the International Olympic Committee
- Incumbent
- Assumed office 23 June 2025
- Preceded by: Thomas Bach

Minister of Youth, Sport, Arts and Recreation of Zimbabwe
- In office 10 September 2018 – 25 March 2025
- President: Emmerson Mnangagwa
- Deputy: Yeukai Simbanegavi; Tinoda Machakaire; Emily Jesaya
- Preceded by: Kazembe Kazembe
- Succeeded by: Anselem Nhamo Sanyatwe

Personal details
- Born: Kirsty Leigh Coventry; 16 September 1983 (age 43) Harare, Zimbabwe
- Party: Independent
- Spouse: Tyrone Seward (m. 2013)
- Children: 2
- Education: Auburn University (BS)
- Sports career
- National team: Zimbabwe
- Height: 1.76 m (5 ft 9 in)
- Weight: 64 kg (141 lb; 10.1 st)
- Website: KirstyCoventry.com
- Sport: Swimming
- Strokes: Backstroke, individual medley
- Club: Longhorn Aquatics
- College team: Auburn University
- Coach: Sharon Freeman, Dean Price, Kim Brackin, David Marsh
Medal record
Women's swimming
Representing Zimbabwe
Olympic Games
Gold medal – first place	2004 Athens	200 m backstroke
Gold medal – first place	2008 Beijing	200 m backstroke
Silver medal – second place	2004 Athens	100 m backstroke
Silver medal – second place	2008 Beijing	100 m backstroke
Silver medal – second place	2008 Beijing	200 m medley
Silver medal – second place	2008 Beijing	400 m medley
Bronze medal – third place	2004 Athens	200 m medley
World Championships (LC)
Gold medal – first place	2005 Montreal	100 m backstroke
Gold medal – first place	2005 Montreal	200 m backstroke
Gold medal – first place	2009 Rome	200 m backstroke
Silver medal – second place	2005 Montreal	200 m medley
Silver medal – second place	2005 Montreal	400 m medley
Silver medal – second place	2007 Melbourne	200 m backstroke
Silver medal – second place	2007 Melbourne	200 m medley
Silver medal – second place	2009 Rome	400 m medley
World Championships (SC)
Gold medal – first place	2008 Manchester	400 m medley
Gold medal – first place	2008 Manchester	100 m backstroke
Gold medal – first place	2008 Manchester	200 m backstroke
Gold medal – first place	2008 Manchester	200 m medley
Bronze medal – third place	2008 Manchester	100 m medley
Commonwealth Games
Gold medal – first place	2002 Manchester	200 m medley
African Games
Gold medal – first place	2007 Algiers	50 m freestyle
Gold medal – first place	2007 Algiers	800 m freestyle
Gold medal – first place	2007 Algiers	50 m backstroke
Gold medal – first place	2007 Algiers	100 m backstroke
Gold medal – first place	2007 Algiers	200 m backstroke
Gold medal – first place	2007 Algiers	200 m medley
Gold medal – first place	2007 Algiers	400 m medley
Gold medal – first place	2011 Maputo	100 m backstroke
Gold medal – first place	2011 Maputo	200 m backstroke
Gold medal – first place	2011 Maputo	200 m medley
Gold medal – first place	2011 Maputo	400 m medley
Gold medal – first place	2015 Brazzaville	100 m backstroke
Gold medal – first place	2015 Brazzaville	200 m backstroke
Gold medal – first place	2015 Brazzaville	200 m medley
Silver medal – second place	2007 Algiers	100 m breaststroke
Silver medal – second place	2007 Algiers	4 × 100 m medley
Silver medal – second place	2007 Algiers	4 × 200 m freestyle
Silver medal – second place	2011 Maputo	100 m butterfly
Silver medal – second place	2011 Maputo	4 × 100 m medley
Silver medal – second place	2011 Maputo	4 × 100 m freestyle
Silver medal – second place	2011 Maputo	4 × 200 m freestyle
Bronze medal – third place	2015 Brazzaville	4 × 100 m mixed medley

Kirsty Leigh Coventry Seward (née Coventry; born 16 September 1983) is a Zimbabwean politician, sports administrator, and former competitive swimmer who is the president of the International Olympic Committee (IOC). She has served as the president of the IOC since 23 June 2025, and is the first woman, first Zimbabwean, and the first African to hold the office, while also only the second non-European president of the IOC, following Avery Brundage who left office in 1972.

Born in Harare, Coventry attended and swam competitively for Auburn University in Alabama, in the United States. At the 2004 Summer Olympics in Athens, Coventry won three Olympic medals: a gold, a silver, and a bronze, and in the 2008 Summer Olympics in Beijing she won four medals: a gold and three silver. She was subsequently described by Paul Chingoka, head of the Zimbabwe Olympic Committee, as "our national treasure". In 2016, Coventry retired from swimming after her fifth Olympics, having won the joint-most individual medals in women's swimming in Olympic history and she is the most decorated African Olympian. She is a member of the IOC and was elected the Chairperson of the IOC Athletes' Commission, the body that represents all Olympic athletes worldwide, in early 2018.

Coventry has had a close relationship with the authoritarian government of Zimbabwe under successive dictators — first Robert Mugabe then, following the 2017 coup d'état, Emmerson Mnangagwa who appointed her to his cabinet as the minister overseeing sport. Mugabe had previously called her "a golden girl", and awarded her US$100,000 in cash for her 2008 Olympic performance. Her association with the regime led to her being described by some as "the Soft Face of Zimbabwe’s Dictatorship".

== Early life ==
Coventry was born in Harare on 16 September 1983 to Robert Edwin and Lyn Coventry of White descent. She attended the Dominican Convent, a Catholic all-girls private school in Harare.

== Swimming career ==
=== 2000 and 2004 Olympics ===
In 2000, while still in high school at the Dominican Convent in Harare, Coventry qualified for the Olympics in Sydney. She became the first Zimbabwean swimmer to reach the semifinals at the Olympics and was named the country's Sports Woman of the Year. In the games, she broke the Zimbabwean national record twice in the 100 metre backstroke event, and the African continental record in the 200 metre individual medley event; she did not qualify for the final in either event. She qualified for the 2002 Commonwealth Games in Manchester, England, winning gold in the 200 metre individual medley event. She finished with a time of 2:14.53, a Commonwealth Games record.

Coventry qualified for her second Olympics, in 2004 in Athens, Greece. She won three medals, including a gold medal in the 200-metre backstroke event; where she broke an African continental record. Coventry won a silver medal in the 100 metre backstroke event. She finished behind the winner by 0.13 of a second, breaking an African record of 1:00.50. She claimed her bronze medal in the 200 metre individual medley event, breaking an African record of 2:12.72. Her three medals were the only medals won by Zimbabwe in the 2004 Summer Olympics, which was their second-highest medal count ever. Coventry also became the nation's first athlete in its history to claim an individual Olympic medal.

=== College career ===
As a student at Auburn University in Alabama, United States, Coventry helped lead the Tigers to National Collegiate Athletic Association (NCAA) Championships in 2003 and 2004. In 2005, she was the top individual scorer at the NCAA Championships and captured three individual titles including the 200-yard and 400-yard individual medley (IM), and the 200-yard backstroke for the second consecutive season. She was named the College Swimming Coaches Association Swimmer of the Meet for her efforts. Other awards include 2005 Southeastern Conference (SEC) Swimmer of the Year, and the 2004–05 SEC Female Athlete of the Year. She was also the recipient of the 2004–05 Honda Sports Award for Swimming and Diving, recognizing her as the outstanding college female swimmer of the year. In 2006, she graduated from Auburn with a Bachelor of Science in Hotel and Restaurant Management.

=== 2005 and 2007 World Aquatics Championships ===
At the 2005 World Championships in Montreal, Canada, Coventry improved on her 2004 Olympic medal count by winning gold in both the 100 m and 200 m backstroke and silver in the 200 m and the 400 m IM. She bettered her Olympic gold-winning 200 m backstroke time with a performance of 2:08.52. She was one of just two swimmers from Zimbabwe along with Warren Paynter.

In Melbourne, Australia, at the 2007 World Championships, Coventry won silver medals in the 200 m backstroke and 200 m IM. She was disqualified in the 400 m IM when finishing second to eventual winner Katie Hoff in her heat. Coventry finished in a disappointing 14th place in the 100 m backstroke in a time of 1:01.73, failing to qualify for the final. She continued her good form of 2007 by winning four gold medals at the International Swim Meet in Narashino, Japan. She led the way in the 200 m and 400 m IM as well as the 100 m and 200 m backstroke. In the 2007 All-Africa Games in Algiers, Algeria, Coventry won seven gold and three silver medals.

=== 2008 and 2009 seasons ===
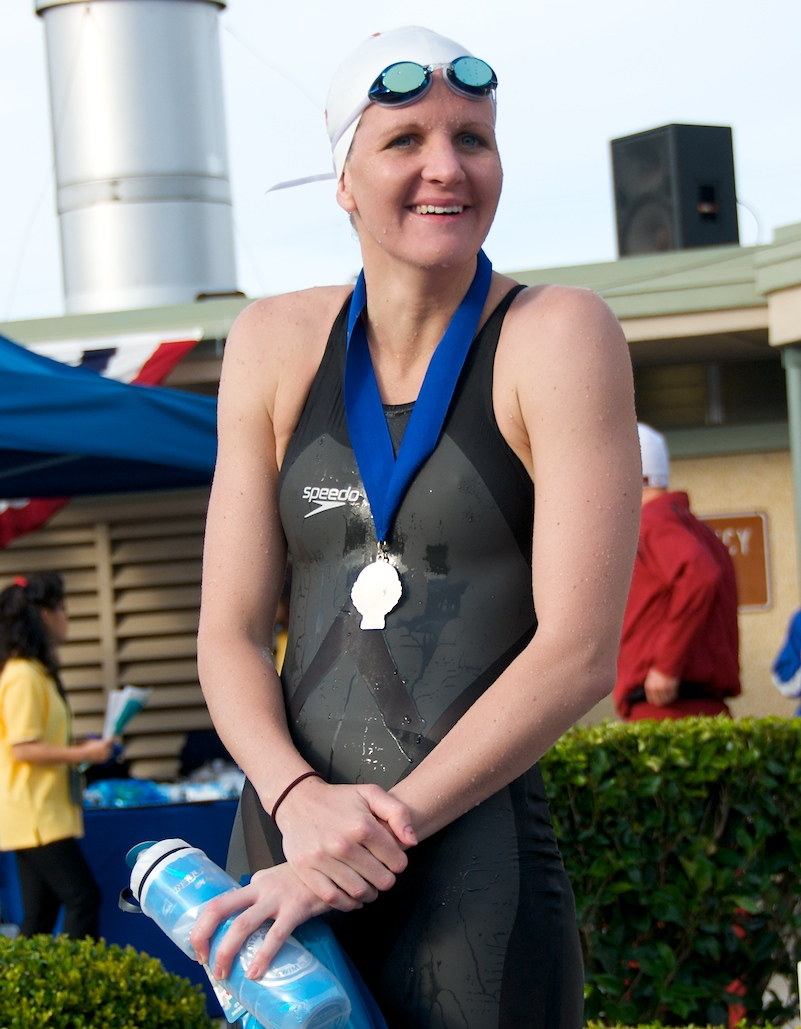
Coventry in 2009

In 2008, Coventry broke her first world record in the 200 m backstroke at the Missouri Grand Prix. She bettered the mark set by Krisztina Egerszegi in August 1991, the second-oldest swimming world record. Her new record was 2:06.39. Coventry continued her winning streak at the meet by winning the 100 m backstroke and the 200 m IM. Coventry is the third woman in history to break the 1:00 minute barrier in the 100 m backstroke, and the second to break the 59-second barrier.

At the 2008 Manchester Short Course World Championships, Coventry broke her second world record, setting a time, whilst winning the gold medal, of 4:26.52 in the 400 m IM. The following day saw Coventry win her second gold medal of the championships in the 100 m backstroke. Her time of 57:10 was a new championship record and the second-fastest time in history in the event. Only Natalie Coughlin has swum faster (56:51). Day three of the championships saw Coventry break another championship record in qualifying fastest for the final of the 200 m backstroke. Her time of 2:03.69 was a mere four-tenths of a second outside the current world record set by Reiko Nakamura in Tokyo in 2008. Coventry then bettered this time to take her second world record of the championships by winning the final in a time of 2:00.91. She then went on to shatter the short course World Record in winning the 200 m individual medley in 2:06.13.

Coventry represented Zimbabwe at the 2008 Summer Olympics in Beijing, China. Coventry won the silver medal in the 400 metre individual medley event on 10 August 2008, becoming the second woman to swim the medley in less than 4:30, the first being Stephanie Rice who won the gold in the same event. Coventry beat the world record by just under two seconds and was only just beaten by Rice to a new world record. Coventry, in the second semi-final of the 100 m backstroke event, set a new world record of 58.77 seconds. In the final of that event, she was beaten to the gold medal by Natalie Coughlin. Coventry was again beaten by Stephanie Rice in the 200 m individual medley, despite swimming under the former world record. Coventry did defend her Olympic title in the 200 m backstroke, winning gold in a world record time of 2:05.24. She was the country's flag bearer at the closing ceremony. She was the lone member of the delegation to medal, helping win Zimbabwe's most medals at the Olympics ever.

Awarded US$100,000 by President Mugabe for her success at the Olympics, Coventry gave that money to charity. At the 2009 World Aquatics Championships in Rome, Italy, Coventry won a gold and a silver. She won the 200 m backstroke world title with a world record time and came second in the 400 m individual medley. She came fourth in the 200 m individual medley final and eighth in the 100 m backstroke final.

=== 2012 and 2016 Olympics ===
Coventry qualified for her fourth Olympic Games in the 2012 Olympics in London, England. For the first time since 2000, Coventry did not win a medal. She finished third in her semifinal heat of the 200 m individual medley, just edging her into the final, where she placed 6th with a time of 2:11.13. In the 200 m backstroke, she finished outside medal contention in sixth place with a time of 2:08.18. She was given the honor of carrying the Zimbabwean flag into the opening ceremony for the first time. Previously, Coventry won four gold and four silver medals in the 2011 All-Africa Games in Maputo, Mozambique.

Her fifth and final Olympic appearance came at the 2016 Olympics in Rio de Janeiro, Brazil, where she repeated her 6th-place performance in the 200 metre backstroke from 2012, with a time of 2:08.80. She also finished 11th in the 100 metre backstroke. She retired after the 2016 Olympics, where she carried the Zimbabwean flag into the stadium during the opening ceremony for the second and final time. In her final African Games in 2015, in Brazzaville, the Republic of the Congo, Coventry won three golds and one bronze medals.

== Zimbabwean cabinet ==
On 7 September 2018, Coventry was appointed Minister of Youth, Sport, Arts and Recreation in Zimbabwe's cabinet under Zimbabwean president Emmerson Mnangagwa. Her cabinet role led to her being dubbed "the soft face of Zimbabwe’s dictatorship" as she played a key role in the authoritarian regime.

In response to criticism for taking a position in Mnangagwa's government, which took power in a coup d'état and rigged elections, Coventry said "I don't think you can stand on the sidelines and scream and shout for change", and that "I believe you have to be seated at the table to try and create it." Her tenure was widely viewed as a failure and led to her being described as "one of the most criticised members of Mnangagwa's cabinet."

Among the criticisms levelled against her was her engagement in nepotistic appointments and political interference in sport. After her appointment as minister in 2019, she appointed Gerald Mlotshwa, Mnangagwa's son-in-law, as chairman of the Sports and Recreation Commission (SRC) which regulates sport in Zimbabwe. The SRC, led by her appointees, removed the elected board and installed an interim committee to run Zimbabwe Cricket, resulting in suspension by the International Cricket Council (ICC) for political interference and a demand that the elected board be reinstated. The suspension was lifted three months later after Coventry "unconditionally complied with the conditions set down by the ICC Board."

Her management again came under criticism after the Confederation of African Football's decision to ban Zimbabwe from hosting national team games in 2020, citing a lack of safety in the country's stadiums due to lack of maintenance.

In 2022, Coventry's actions again led to Zimbabwe being sanctioned in international sport when it was banned by FIFA after her Sports and Recreation Commission (SRC) removed the entire executive of the Zimbabwe Football Association, a decision Coventry declined to appeal, as the government aimed to take control of the football association. The ban was lifted 18 months later, allowing the national team to compete internationally and take part in African World Cup qualifiers, with FIFA warning Coventry to stay out of the football association’s affairs.

Coventry was accused of having been misallocated farmland by Robert Zhuwao, the nephew of former President Mugabe, but was cleared after it was revealed in court that she received a different subdivision of the farm in question and that Zhuwao had abandoned his subdivision.

Coventry was re-appointed by Mnangagwa in September 2023 after his re-election in a vote viewed as rigged.

In the role, she collaborated closely with Gold Mafia kingpin Scott Sakupwanya, who she described as a friend and publicly praised despite his gold smuggling notoriety.

Her tenure came under frequent criticism from the arts community and others due to perceived inaction and lack of attention to that aspect of her portfolio. Athletes also criticised her, with Zimbabwe's only Ultimate Fighting Championship MMA fighter Themba Gorimbo describing her as "the worst sports minister ever."

== IOC presidency ==
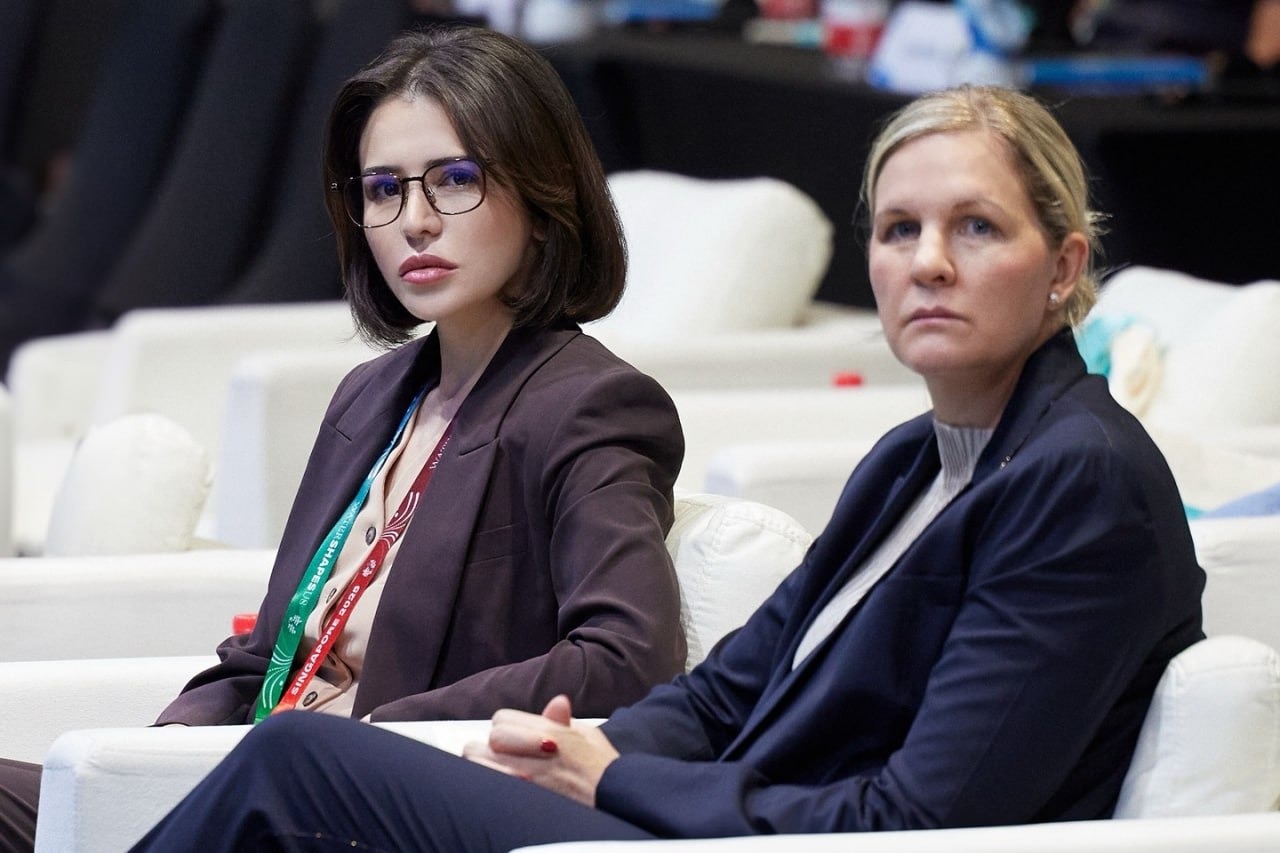
Coventry with Shakhnoza Mirziyoyeva at the World Aquatics conference, 29 July 2025

=== Pre-presidency IOC career ===
Coventry was first elected to the IOC Athletes' Commission in August 2012 in London. Her initial election became controversial, she had initially placed fifth in the athlete voting for four available seats. However, she was elevated to the commission after two of the top four finishers, Japanese hammer thrower Koji Murofushi and Chinese Taipei taekwondo athlete Chu Mu-yen, were disqualified by the IOC Executive Board for breaching campaigning rules. Coventry had personally filed an official complaint regarding Murofushi's unauthorized campaigning. The executive board, which included future president Thomas Bach, subsequently awarded the vacated seats to Coventry and French canoeist Tony Estanguet, joining Danka Barteková and James Tomkins. The disqualifications were subsequently upheld by the Court of Arbitration for Sport on appeal.

She was re-elected to the Commission and named its chair in 2018 after the presumptive candidate, Tony Estanguet, withdrew to focus on his role leading the Paris 2024 Organising Committee (COJO). Coventry ran unopposed and her appointment was nominated by then IOC president Thomas Bach. She assumed leadership of the commission during a highly sensitive geopolitical period, navigating live issues surrounding the Russian state-sponsored doping scandal, shifting World Anti-Doping Agency (WADA) regulations, and complex questions over athlete representation.

She stepped down from the Athletes' Commission chair in 2021 at the conclusion of the Tokyo Olympic Games. To ensure she did not leave the organization upon finishing her athlete term, she was personally nominated by Thomas Bach to transition into an independent individual IOC member, a change of status approved by the IOC Session with 71 votes to 9. This crucial transition altered her tenure parameters, allowing her to retain her full voting rights and remain an active IOC member until the mandatory retirement age of 70. In 2023, she was nominated by Bach and elected unopposed to a permanent seat on the IOC Executive Board.

=== 2025 presidential election ===
In September 2024, she was announced as one of seven candidates in the running to succeed Thomas Bach as IOC president.

Coventry was not considered an early front-runner in the race, with reporting in early 2025 describing her campaign as struggling to gain traction against more experienced rivals such as Sebastian Coe and Juan Antonio Samaranch Jr.. Even as she retained Bach's tacit backing, some media outlets referred to her as Bach's "Crown Princess". The election was conducted under restrictive IOC rules that barred candidates from publishing campaign videos, holding public meetings, taking part in debates, or receiving public endorsements.

The campaign structure was limited to a single 15-minute presentation to members in January 2025, with no opportunity for questions afterward, a process criticized by IOC honorary member Dick Pound, who remarked that it "makes the Vatican conclave look like it's open house". Up until the final 48 hours before the vote, internal campaign trackers estimated that Samaranch was the slight favourite, holding up to 30 baseline votes, while Coe and Coventry held distinct blocks in the mid 20s.

Following Coventry's victory on the first ballot with 49 votes against six other candidates (Juan Antonio Samaranch Salisachs, Sebastian Coe, David Lappartient, Morinari Watanabe, Johan Eliasch, and Prince Faisal bin Hussein) at the 144th IOC Session in Costa Navarino, investigative reports detailed that intense last-minute lobbying by Thomas Bach and the "IOC machine" had been the decisive factor in routing votes her way. Sources within the session revealed that senior IOC members conducted aggressive phone campaigns and "strong-arming", instructing voters not to waste their ballots and to vote for Bach's preferred successor. The post-mortem of the election triggered substantial criticism from rival camps, who questioned whether the IOC administration had violated its own charter rules, which explicitly mandate that the administration maintain strict neutrality at all times during presidential transitions.

Shortly after her election, Coventry resigned her cabinet position in Zimbabwe to begin her transition to the IOC Presidency. Coventry officially became president on 23 June 2025, after former IOC President Thomas Bach concluded his term as President. Two weeks after her presidential election, Coventry was received at the Olympic House in Lausanne by then-IOC president Bach.

Election of the 10th IOC President
Candidate	Results
(Zimbabwe) Kirsty Coventry	49
(Spain) Juan Antonio Samaranch Salisachs	28
(United Kingdom) Sebastian Coe	8
(France) David Lappartient	4
(Japan) Morinari Watanabe	4
(United Kingdom) Johan Eliasch	2
(Jordan) Prince Faisal bin Hussein	2

=== Tenure ===
On 23 June 2025, Coventry was inaugurated as the president of the IOC, following her presidential handover to commemorate the founding of the first modern Olympic Games in 1894. Coventry said her vision is to restore the Olympics as a beacon of inclusivity and unity, ensuring that the Games are truly for everyone, regardless of their background or birthplace. Coventry said she plans to empower athletes and promote social equity to focus on feminism and gender equality. Her election was variously described as "seismic”, "groundbreaking", and "landmark".

Unlike the IOC Presidents before her, Coventry and her family are not living at the Lausanne Palace hotel. The cost of housing the IOC President at the hotel was €2,350 per night.

Coventry has stated her intent to "keep sport a neutral ground" when asked about the role of politics in sport. Coventry has continued to push for ensuring the neutrality and autonomy of sport within the first year of her presidency as regional geopolitical issues continued to persist. Various reforms to the Olympic Charter are set to be implemented to ensure this neutrality and autonomy.

President Coventry intends to oversee various changes within the Olympic movement through her “Fit For the Future” package of reforms. Following her election, Coventry announced a review of issues facing the Olympics, including the Olympic host city bidding process. Details on host city election reform were partly announced at the 145th IOC Session in 2026, which included more transparency and a proposed "short-list stage". As of 2026, Coventry has paused planning for the first edition of the Olympic Esports Games and has also paused the planning for future editions of the Youth Olympic Games past 2028 in a restructuring of the Olympic movement. The election of the host of the 2030 Summer Youth Olympics was postponed to a later date.

During the 2026 FIFA World Cup, The International Olympic Committee received a request to its Ethics Commission to investigate FIFA President Gianni Infantino who serves as an IOC member. The complaint, filed by FairSquare follows the Folarin Balogun red card controversy where US President Donald Trump called Gianni Infantino asking him to review the red card. After these calls, the red card was provisionally suspended, allowing Folarin Balogun to play in the US round of 16 match against Belgium. Kirsty Coventry confirmed that the IOC was monitoring the controversy and that the complaint will be considered once it is received by the ethics commission. The complaint was received by the IOC the following week, but was not investigated due to it being outside of the IOC’s legal jurisdiction.

=== Views and policy ===
==== Transgender athletes ====
During her campaign for the IOC presidency, Coventry stated that she supported banning transgender women from competing in women's events, saying that "ensuring fairness in women's sport and maintaining the integrity of women's categories is essential". Her stance contrasted with previous IOC efforts which loosened earlier contraints for transgender and intersex athletes' participation in Olympic sports.

On 26 March 2026, the IOC under Coventry established a new policy that banned transgender women from women's Olympic events, ensuring that only those with an XX chromosome compete in the female categories. This policy will come into effect starting with the 2028 Summer Olympics in Los Angeles. This policy will be implemented using an SRY gene test which uses a cheek swab. This policy also restricts female athletes with differences in sex development, such as the two-time Olympic champion runner Caster Semenya. Both IOC and Coventry had wanted a clear policy rather than continuing to advise sports' governing bodies who drafted their own rules. In a statement, Coventry said: "At the Olympic Games, even the smallest margins can be the difference between victory and defeat ... So, it is absolutely clear that it would not be fair for biological males to compete in the female category." The decision was described as a U-turn of the IOC and that Coventry was reflecting the political change.

Human rights experts and organisations criticised the policy as “a blunt and discriminatory response that is not supported by science and violates international human rights law”, while warning that mandatory genetic testing “violates fundamental and universal human rights … including the right to equality, non-discrimination, dignity, privacy, and bodily autonomy”.

Gurchaten Sandhu, Director of Programmes at ILGA World, stated that reintroducing sex testing marked a return to policies abandoned decades earlier, which had been deemed scientifically inconclusive and harmful to athletes. Academic research has similarly highlighted that mandatory sex testing was discontinued in the 1990s following widespread scientific, legal, and ethical objections, and its reintroduction has been characterised as a return to contested practices in elite sport. Medical experts had already supported the abolition of sex testing at the 2000 Sydney Olympics, describing such tests as “difficult, expensive, and potentially inaccurate” and noting that they could be discriminatory and have “shattering consequences” for affected athletes.

==== Payments to athletes ====
Coventry has opposed to offering prize money to athletes, but has favoured broader payments to athletes. In May 2026, Coventry elicited criticism when she publicly voiced that athletes should not be paid prize money at the Olympic Games. Coventry specifically stated that "[she comes] from a small country, [she comes] from a sport that doesn’t necessarily pay athletes very well and [she] still [doesn't] think [they] should be paying athletes at the Olympic Games." For reference, the IOC does not pay athletes a stipend or salary for competing at the Olympic Games. Her remarks were criticized by Olympians such as Cameron McEvoy and Matt Richards, with McEvoy stating that the “could not have been stated at a more inopportune time." In a later statement, Coventry stated that her original comments were misquoted and that her initial comments were specifically about prize money rather than the broader payment to athletes. Coventry confirmed that she supports finding ways to better support athletes on their journey through sport and to support them on their transition following their retirement from athletic competition.

In June 2026, the IOC established a grant program which will pay each athlete competing at the Olympic Games a US$10,000 grant. This grant will be available to each eligible athlete regardless of whether or not they medal. The athletes who competed at the 2026 Winter Olympics will be the first to be eligible for this grant.

==== Russia ====
After the 2022 Russian invasion of Ukraine, the IOC Executive Board recommended "no participation of Russian and Belarusian athletes and officials, urges International Sports Federations and organisers of sports events worldwide to do everything in their power to ensure that no athlete or sports official from Russia or Belarus be allowed to take part under the name of Russia or Belarus". After Kirsty Coventry became IOC President in 2025, the International Olympic Committee began considering the return of Russia to the Olympic Games. Despite the conflict between Russia and Ukraine, Coventry expressed openness to revisiting Russia's participation. The ban was provisionally lifted in July 2026, allowing Russian athletes to compete at the 2028 Summer Olympics in Los Angeles in some capacity. The ban on Belarusian athletes was previously lifted in May. The lifting of the ban on Russia was lifted coinciding with the start of the qualification period for the 2028 Summer Olympics and the 2028 Winter Youth Olympics, with the IOC and Coventry citing that the ROC no longer controlled sporting bodies in occupied Ukrainian territory and that athletes should not be held responsible for their government's actions. As part of the decision, the IOC remained undecided on the use of Russia's flag, colours, and anthem, but insisted that Russian athletes may compete upon meeting relevant anti-doping requirements. The IOC also upheld its stance of not hosting events in the country.

In October 2026, Russia's sports minister Mikhail Degtaryev published information about ongoing correspondence between him and Coventry, in which she welcomed the organization of the sports diplomacy forum "Russia – Sports Power" in Krasnoyarsk.

== Personal life ==
On 10 August 2013, Coventry married Tyrone Seward, who had been her manager since 2010. In May 2019, she gave birth to their first child, a daughter named Ella. Coventry gave birth to her second daughter Lily in late November 2024.

== Personal bests and appearances ==
With seven Olympic medals, Coventry is the most decorated Olympian from Africa. At the time of her retirement, she had tied with Krisztina Egerszegi for having won the most individual Olympic medals in women's swimming. This feat has since been surpassed by Katie Ledecky. Coventry competed at five Olympics, from 2000 to 2016. As of 2024, she has won all but one of Zimbabwe's Olympic medals. She was inducted into the International Swimming Hall of Fame in 2023.

Event	Medal	Time	Meet	Location	Date	Notes
200 m individual medley	1st place, gold medalist(s)	2:14.53	2002 Commonwealth Games	Manchester, England	30 July 2002	CR
100 m backstroke	2nd place, silver medalist(s)	1:00.50	2004 Summer Olympics	Athens, Greece	16 August 2004	AF
200 m backstroke	1st place, gold medalist(s)	2:09.19	2004 Summer Olympics	Athens, Greece	20 August 2004	AF
200 m individual medley	3rd place, bronze medalist(s)	2:12.72	2004 Summer Olympics	Athens, Greece	17 August 2004	
100 m backstroke	1st place, gold medalist(s)	1:00.24	2005 World Aquatics Championships	Montreal, Canada	26 July 2005	
200 m backstroke	1st place, gold medalist(s)	2:08.52	2005 World Aquatics Championships	Montreal, Canada	30 July 2005	
200 m individual medley	2nd place, silver medalist(s)	2:11.13	2005 World Aquatics Championships	Montreal, Canada	25 July 2005	
400 m individual medley	2nd place, silver medalist(s)	4:39.72	2005 World Aquatics Championships	Montreal, Canada	31 July 2005	
50 m backstroke	1st place, gold medalist(s)	28.89	2007 All-African Games	Algiers, Algeria	16 July 2007	AF
100 m backstroke	1st place, gold medalist(s)	1:01.28	2007 All-African Games	Algiers, Algeria	14 July 2007	AF
200 m backstroke	1st place, gold medalist(s)	2:10.66	2007 All-African Games	Algiers, Algeria	17 July 2007	AF
100 m breaststroke	2nd place, silver medalist(s)	2:10.66	2007 All-African Games	Algiers, Algeria	16 July 2007	
50 m freestyle	1st place, gold medalist(s)	2:11.13	2007 All-African Games	Algiers, Algeria	18 July 2007	
800 m freestyle	1st place, gold medalist(s)	8:43.89	2007 All-African Games	Algiers, Algeria	14 July 2007	AF
200 m individual medley	1st place, gold medalist(s)	2:13.02	2007 All-African Games	Algiers, Algeria	18 July 2007	AF
400 m individual medley	1st place, gold medalist(s)	4:39.91	2007 All-African Games	Algiers, Algeria	12 July 2007	AF
4 × 200 m freestyle	2nd place, silver medalist(s)	8:38.20	2007 All-African Games	Algiers, Algeria	14 July 2007	NR
4 × 100 m medley	2nd place, silver medalist(s)	4:21.60	2007 All-African Games	Algiers, Algeria	18 July 2007	NR
200 m backstroke	2nd place, silver medalist(s)	2:07.54	2007 World Aquatics Championships	Melbourne, Australia	26 March 2007	
200 m individual medley	2nd place, silver medalist(s)	2:10.76	2007 World Aquatics Championships	Melbourne, Australia	26 March 2007	
100 m backstroke	2nd place, silver medalist(s)	59.19	2008 Summer Olympics	Beijing, China	12 August 2008	WR (h)
200 m backstroke	1st place, gold medalist(s)	2:05.24	2008 Summer Olympics	Beijing, China	12 August 2008	WR
200 m individual medley	2nd place, silver medalist(s)	2:08.59	2008 Summer Olympics	Beijing, China	13 August 2008	AF
400 m individual medley	2nd place, silver medalist(s)	4:29.89	2008 Summer Olympics	Beijing, China	10 August 2008	AF
200 m backstroke	1st place, gold medalist(s)	2:04.81	2009 World Aquatics Championships	Rome, Italy	1 August 2009	WR
400 m individual medley	2nd place, silver medalist(s)	4:32.12	2009 World Aquatics Championships	Rome, Italy	2 August 2009	
100 m backstroke	1st place, gold medalist(s)	1:00.86	2011 All-Africa Games	Maputo, Mozambique	7 September 2011	AR
200 m backstroke	1st place, gold medalist(s)	2:12.40	2011 All-Africa Games	Maputo, Mozambique	10 September 2011	
100 m butterfly	2nd place, silver medalist(s)	1:02.20	2011 All-Africa Games	Maputo, Mozambique	8 September 2011	
200 m individual medley	1st place, gold medalist(s)	2:13.70	2011 All-Africa Games	Maputo, Mozambique	9 September 2011	
400 m individual medley	1st place, gold medalist(s)	4:44.34	2011 All-Africa Games	Maputo, Mozambique	5 September 2011	
4 × 100 m freestyle	2nd place, silver medalist(s)	3:57.81	2011 All-Africa Games	Maputo, Mozambique	7 September 2011	
4 × 200 m freestyle	2nd place, silver medalist(s)	8:42.23	2011 All-Africa Games	Maputo, Mozambique	5 September 2011	
4 × 100 m medley	2nd place, silver medalist(s)	4:24.01	2011 All-Africa Games	Maputo, Mozambique	10 September 2011	
100 m backstroke	1st place, gold medalist(s)	1:01.15	2015 African Games	Brazzaville, Republic of Congo	8 September 2015	AR
200 m backstroke	1st place, gold medalist(s)	2:13.29	2015 African Games	Brazzaville, Republic of Congo	11 September 2015	
200 m individual medley	1st place, gold medalist(s)	2:16.05	2015 African Games	Brazzaville, Republic of Congo	10 September 2015	

Legend: WR – World record; AF – African record; CR – Commonwealth record; NR – Zimbabwean record; e – equalled existing record;
Records not set in finals: h – heat; sf – semifinal; r – relay 1st leg; rh – relay heat 1st leg; b – B final; † – en route to final mark; so – swim-off; tt – time trial

== See also ==
- List of sportsperson-politicians
- List of World Aquatics Championships medalists in swimming (women)
- White Zimbabweans
- World record progression 100 metres backstroke
- World record progression 200 metres backstroke

Records
Preceded by Natalie Coughlin	Women's 100 metre backstroke world record holder (long course); 11 August 2008 – 27 July 2009	Succeeded by Anastasia Zuyeva
Preceded by Krisztina Egerszegi	Women's 200 metre backstroke world record holder (long course); 16 February 2008 – 5 July 2008	Succeeded by Margaret Hoelzer
Preceded by Margaret Hoelzer	Women's 200 metre backstroke world record holder (long course); 16 August 2008 – 3 August 2012	Succeeded by Missy Franklin
Preceded by Reiko Nakamura	Women's 200-metre backstroke world record-holder (short course); 11 April 2008 – 14 November 2009	Succeeded by Shiho Sakai
Awards
Preceded by First award Suzaan van Biljon; Mandy Loots; Karin Prinsloo	African Swimmer of the Year; 2004, 2005; 2007, 2008, 2009; 2011, 2012; 2015, 2016	Succeeded by Suzaan van Biljon; Mandy Loots; Karin Prinsloo; Farida Osman
Olympic Games
Preceded by Brian Dzingai	Flagbearer for Zimbabwe; 2012 London; 2016 Rio de Janeiro	Succeeded by Donata Katai; Peter Purcell-Gilpin
Preceded by Thomas Bach	President of the International Olympic Committee; 2025–present	Incumbent
