= Scott Sakupwanya =

Zimbabwean politician (born 1979)

Pedzisayi "Scott" Sakupwanya (born 1979) is a Zimbabwean businessman who was installed as a member of parliament for Mabvuku-Tafara constituency in 2023. He was elected unopposed after the Zimbabwean dictatorship disqualified all opponents. A Zvigananda, he has been noted as a key player in Zimbabwe's "Gold Mafia" smuggling ring and for his close ties to International Olympic Committee president Kirsty Coventry.

== Election to parliament ==
He was "elected" to the Zimbabwean parliament as the representative for the Mabvuku-Tafara constituency unopposed in 2023 after the High Court of Zimbabwe decision removed all other candidates in a by-election.

== Corruption allegations ==
He has been described as a key Zvigananda as one of "three wealthy, highly influential businessmen with close ties to the government who are widely believed to be corrupt" alongside Wicknell Chivayo and Kuda Tagwirei.

In 2025, a company associated with Sakupwanya was given control of large sections of Redwing Mine and 132 claims while the mine was under corporate rescue. His operation of the mine was described as "a testament to the lawlessness and impunity of Zimbabwe’s political elite" by GroundUp, a public interest news organization in the country, which added:

With the lawlessness came deaths, corruption and cover ups. The government, law enforcement agencies and regulatory authorities have largely turned a blind eye, despite revelations that senior police and army officers control some of the pits at the mine.

== "Gold mafia" smuggling scandal ==
Sakupwanya is the founder and CEO of Better Brands, a gold mining dealing company. In 2023, Al Jazeera discovered a gold-smuggling and laundering operation, dubbed the "Gold mafia" scandal, which was responsible for washing over $100 million in dirty cash in Zimbabwe in which Sakupwanya played a central role. He and his company were accused by the Centre for Natural Resource Governance of delivering less than half of their gold to Fidelity Printers and Refiners while smuggling the rest abroad.

Sakupwanya appeared in the final episode of the investigation as a ZANU–PF parliamentary candidate in a fixed election who was Zimbabwe's #1 gold figure after supplanting Ewan Macmillan, a convicted smuggler. During the investigation, he was shown agreeing to receive money, buy gold, and pay the undercover journalists offshore with a 10 percent return for the smuggling.

In photographs, Sakupwanya was pictured flaunting $5 million USD in cash and gold bars on June 29, 2020.

== Sport ==
He owns two football clubs: Scottland F.C., that as of 2025 plays in the Zimbabwe Premier Soccer League, and N’ombeyaora, playing in the Northern Region Division One. He has a notably close relationship with IOC President Kirsty Coventry, dating to her time as sports minister in the post-coup d'état Zimbabwean when they were close collaborators. She publicly praised Sakupwanya despite his gold smuggling notoriety.
