= Swimming at the 2009 World Aquatics Championships – Women's 400 metre individual medley =

The heats and finals for the women's 400 m individual medley race at the 2009 World Championships took place in the morning and evening of 2 August at the Foro Italico in Rome, Italy. The order of swimming in the medley is: butterfly, backstroke, breaststroke, freestyle.

== Records ==
Prior to this competition, the existing world and competition records were as follows:

World record	Stephanie Rice (AUS)	4:29.45	Beijing, China	10 August 2008
Championship record	Katie Hoff (USA)	4:32.89	Melbourne, Australia	1 April 2007

The following records were established during the competition:

Date	Round	Name	Nationality	Time	Record
2 August	Final	Katinka Hosszú	Hungary	4:30.31	CR

== Results ==
=== Heats ===
Rank	Name	Nationality	Time	Heat	Lane	Notes
1	Stephanie Rice	Australia	4:34.62	6	4	
2	Elizabeth Beisel	United States	4:34.80	6	5	
3	Katinka Hosszú	Hungary	4:35.15	5	5	
4	Tanya Hunks	Canada	4:35.84	5	8	NR
4	Julia Smit	United States	4:35.84	6	3	
6	Hannah Miley	Great Britain	4:36.27	4	4	
7	Kirsty Coventry	Zimbabwe	4:36.42	5	4	
8	Zsuzsanna Jakabos	Hungary	4:37.47	6	6	
9	Samantha Hamill	Australia	4:37.84	6	1	
10	Julie Hjorth-Hansen	Denmark	4:38.20	5	1	NR
11	Alessia Filippi	Italy	4:39.58	4	5	
12	Yana Martynova	Russia	4:39.83	5	3	
13	Keri-anne Payne	Great Britain	4:40.92	5	6	
14	Anja Klinar	Slovenia	4:41.00	4	6	
15	Annika Mehlhorn	Germany	4:41.20	5	0	
16	Alexa Komarnycky	Canada	4:41.55	5	2	
17	Barbora Závadová	Czech Republic	4:41.90	3	2	
18	Stina Gardell	Sweden	4:42.71	4	9	NR
19	Anastasia Ivanenko	Russia	4:42.96	6	8	
20	Gráinne Murphy	Ireland	4:43.20	3	4	
21	Francesca Segat	Italy	4:43.77	4	8	
22	Joanna Maranhão	Brazil	4:43.87	4	2	
23	Karolina Szczepaniak	Poland	4:45.13	3	5	
24	Jessica Pengelly	South Africa	4:46.31	4	1	
25	Asami Kitagawa	Japan	4:46.57	6	9	
26	Lara Grangeon	France	4:46.93	5	7	
27	Maiko Fujino	Japan	4:47.11	4	7	
28	Zheng Rongrong	China	4:48.87	5	9	
29	Jordis Steinegger	Austria	4:49.74	6	0	
30	Marina Ribi	Switzerland	4:50.53	3	0	NR
31	Katheryn Meaklim	South Africa	4:51.09	4	3	
32	Nuala Murphy	Ireland	4:52.12	3	1	
33	Paula Zukowska	Poland	4:53.52	3	7	
34	Nina Dittrich	Austria	4:55.10	1	3	
35	Nika Karlina Petric	Slovenia	4:58.90	3	6	
36	Maroua Mathlouthi	Tunisia	5:00.95	3	9	
37	Koh Hui Yu	Singapore	5:02.13	2	7	
38	Chen Ting	Hong Kong	5:02.97	2	3	
39	Erika Stewart	Colombia	5:04.24	1	5	
40	Maria Coy	Guatemala	5:06.74	2	5	
41	Ting Sheng-Yo	Chinese Taipei	5:07.73	2	8	
42	Koh Ting Ting	Singapore	5:09.52	2	6	
43	Nibal Yamout	Lebanon	5:13.71	2	2	
44	Pooja Raghava Alva	India	5:28.37	2	0	
45	Stephanie Rasoamanana	Madagascar	5:56.61	2	9	
–	Sakina Ghulam	Pakistan	DNS	1	4	
–	Sara Nordenstam	Norway	DNS	6	7	
–	Samantha Arevalo	Ecuador	DQ	2	1	
–	Tetyana Khala	Ukraine	DQ	2	4	
–	Louise Mai Jansen	Denmark	DQ	3	3	
–	Anna-Liisa Põld	Estonia	DQ	3	8	
–	Liu Jing	China	DQ	4	0	
–	Mireia Belmonte García	Spain	DQ	6	2	

=== Finals ===
Rank	Name	Nationality	Time	Lane	Notes
1st place, gold medalist(s)	Katinka Hosszú	Hungary	4:30.31	3	CR, ER
2nd place, silver medalist(s)	Kirsty Coventry	Zimbabwe	4:32.12	1	
3rd place, bronze medalist(s)	Stephanie Rice	Australia	4:32.29	4	
4	Hannah Miley	Great Britain	4:32.72	7	
5	Elizabeth Beisel	United States	4:34.90	5	
6	Julia Smit	United States	4:35.33	2	
7	Zsuzsanna Jakabos	Hungary	4:37.85	8	
8	Tanya Hunks	Canada	4:38.15	6	
