= Swimming at the 2005 World Aquatics Championships – Women's 400 metre individual medley =

Women's 400m Individual Medley at the 2005 FINA World Aquatics Championships
- Dates: 31 July 2005 (prelims and final)
- Competitors: 34 from 24 nations
- Winning time: 4 minutes 36.07 seconds

Medalists
gold medal	Katie Hoff	United States
silver medal	Kirsty Coventry	Zimbabwe
bronze medal	Kaitlin Sandeno	United States

The Women's 400m Individual Medley event at the 11th FINA World Aquatics Championships swam on 31 July 2005 in Montreal, Canada.

At the start of the event, the existing World (WR) and Championships (CR) records were:

- WR: 4:33.59 swum by Yana Klochkova (Ukraine) on 16 September 2000 in Sydney, Australia
- CR: 4:36.10 swum by Petra Schneider (Ukraine) on 1 August 1982 in Guayaquil, Ecuador

== Results ==
=== Final ===
Place	Swimmer	Nation	Time	Notes
1	Katie Hoff	USA	4:36.07	CR
2	Kirsty Coventry	Zimbabwe	4:39.72	
3	Kaitlin Sandeno	USA	4:40.85	
4	Lara Carroll	Australia	4:42.25	
5	Maiko Fujino	Japan	4:42.68	
6	Georgina Bardach	Argentina	4:43.60	
7	Éva Risztov	Hungary	4:43.68	
8	Zsuzsanna Jakabos	Hungary	4:44.65	

=== Preliminaries ===
Rank	Heat + Lane	Swimmer	Nation	Time	Notes
1	H3 L4	Katie Hoff	United States	4:40.91	q
2	H5 L3	Zsuzsanna Jakabos	Hungary	4:42.74	q
3	H5 L5	Éva Risztov	Hungary	4:42.86	q
4	H5 L4	Kaitlin Sandeno	United States	4:43.15	q
5	H3 L6	Lara Carroll	Australia	4:43.25	q
6	H4 L4	Georgina Bardach	Argentina	4:44.20	q
7	H4 L3	Maiko Fujino	Japan	4:45.02	q
8	H5 L6	Kirsty Coventry	Zimbabwe	4:45.95	q
9	H3 L2	Simona Păduraru	Romania	4:46.74	
10	H5 L2	Yoo-Sun Nam	South Korea	4:47.14	
11	H3 L3	Anja Klinar	Slovenia	4:47.25	
12	H3 L5	Alessia Filippi	Italy	4:47.32	
13	H5 L1	Elizabeth Warden	Canada	4:48.81	
14	H3 L7	Ji Yeon Jung	South Korea	4:48.99	
15	H4 L7	Sara Pérez	Spain	4:51.41	
16	H4 L2	Helen Norfolk	New Zealand	4:51.60	
17	H4 L6	Katarzyna Baranowska	Poland	4:51.61	
18	H5 L8	Julie Hjorth-Hansen	Denmark	4:51.94	
19	H5 L7	Aiko Morishita	Japan	4:53.21	
20	H2 L3	Yi Ting Siow	Malaysia	4:53.35	
21	H4 L5	Joanna Maranhão	Brazil	4:53.41	
22	H2 L5	Wan-Tong Cheng	Chinese Taipei	4:55.99	
23	H2 L4	Tanya Hunks	Canada	4:56.18	
24	H4 L8	Sarah Paton	Australia	4:57.90	
25	H3 L8	Kelly Bentley	New Zealand	4:58.30	
26	H3 L1	Man-Hsu Lin	Chinese Taipei	4:59.37	
27	H4 L1	Jing Zhao	China	5:02.36	
28	H2 L6	Louise Jansen	Denmark	5:03.24	
29	H1 L3	Shrone Austin	Seychelles	5:08.17	
30	H2 L7	Ting Wen Quah	Singapore	5:09.37	
31	H1 L4	Alia Atkinson	Jamaica	5:09.72	
32	H2 L2	Bernadette Lee	Singapore	5:09.87	
33	H2 L1	Lacken Malateste	Tahiti	5:15.12	
34	H1 L5	Laura Rodriguez	Dominican Republic	5:21.56	
