= Julie Hardt =

American swimmer

Personal information
- Full name: Julie Hardt
- National team: United States
- Born: c. 1983 Carson City, Nevada

Sport
- Sport: Swimming
- Strokes: Freestyle
- Club: Carson Tigersharks
- College team: University of Georgia
Medal record
Women's swimming
Representing the United States
World Championships (LC)
Gold medal – first place	2001 Fukuoka	4×200 m freestyle

Julie Hardt (born in c. 1983 in Carson City, NV) is a former American swimmer who won a gold medal as a member of the winning U.S. team in the women's 4×200-meter freestyle relay at the 2001 World Aquatics Championships in Fukuoka, Japan. She currently coaches for the Carson Tigersharks. In 2024, she was named an assistant coach for the USA for the 2024 Paralympic Games in Paris.

== See also ==
- List of University of Georgia people
