= Kaitlin Sandeno =

American swimmer

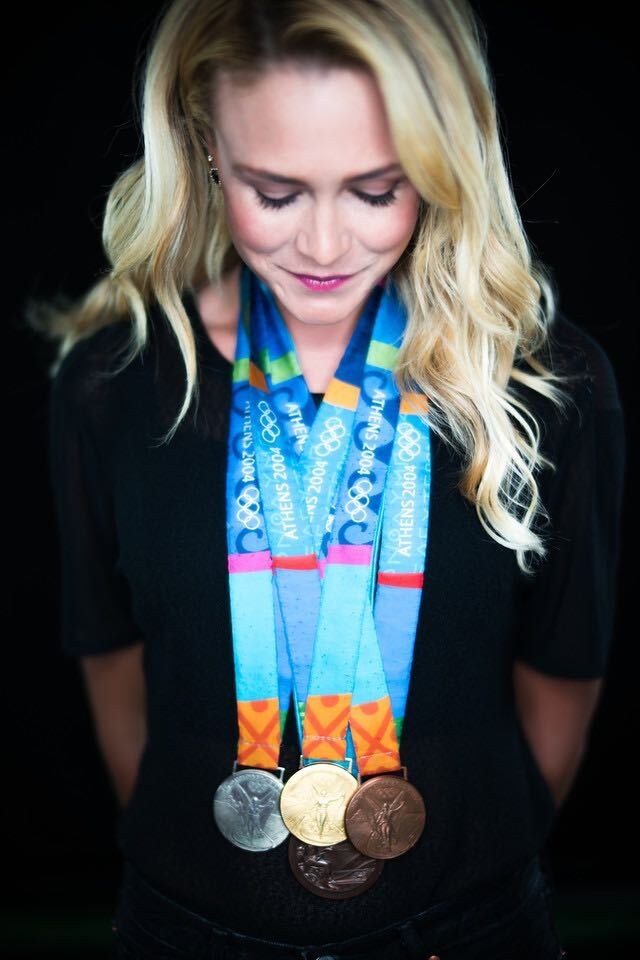
- Sandeno in 2016 with her Olympic medals

Personal information
- Full name: Kaitlin Shea Sandeno
- National team: United States
- Born: March 13, 1983 (age 43) Mission Viejo, California, U.S.
- Height: 5 ft 6 in (168 cm)
- Weight: 119 lb (54 kg)

Sport
- Sport: Swimming
- Strokes: Individual medley, freestyle, butterfly
- College team: University of Southern California
Medal record
Women's swimming
Representing United States
| Event | 1st | 2nd | 3rd |
|---|---|---|---|
| Olympic Games | 1 | 1 | 2 |
| World Championships (LC) | 1 | 0 | 3 |
| World Championships (SC) | 4 | 1 | 1 |
| Pan American Games | 2 | 0 | 0 |
| Universiade | 2 | 0 | 0 |
| Total | 10 | 2 | 6 |
Olympic Games
| Gold medal – first place | 2004 Athens | 4x200 m freestyle |
| Silver medal – second place | 2004 Athens | 400 m medley |
| Bronze medal – third place | 2000 Sydney | 800 m freestyle |
| Bronze medal – third place | 2004 Athens | 400 m freestyle |
World Championships (LC)
| Gold medal – first place | 2005 Montreal | 4x200 m freestyle |
| Bronze medal – third place | 2001 Fukuoka | 200 m butterfly |
| Bronze medal – third place | 2001 Fukuoka | 800 m freestyle |
| Bronze medal – third place | 2005 Montreal | 400 m medley |
World Championships (SC)
| Gold medal – first place | 2004 Indianapolis | 400 m freestyle |
| Gold medal – first place | 2004 Indianapolis | 200 m butterfly |
| Gold medal – first place | 2004 Indianapolis | 400 m medley |
| Gold medal – first place | 2004 Indianapolis | 4x200 m freestyle |
| Silver medal – second place | 2006 Shanghai | 200 m medley |
| Bronze medal – third place | 2006 Shanghai | 4x200 m freestyle |
Pan American Games
| Gold medal – first place | 1999 Winnipeg | 400 m freestyle |
| Gold medal – first place | 1999 Winnipeg | 800 m freestyle |
Universiade
| Gold medal – first place | 2007 Bangkok | 200 m medley |
| Gold medal – first place | 2007 Bangkok | 4x200 m freestyle |

Kaitlin Sandeno-Hogan (born March 13, 1983) is an American former competition swimmer who is an Olympic gold medalist, world champion and former world record-holder. Sandeno was a member of the American team that set a new world record in the 4×200-meter freestyle relay at the 2004 Summer Olympics. She was the general manager of DC Trident which is a part of the International Swimming League for 3 seasons.

== Swimming career ==
=== 2000 Summer Olympics ===
At the 2000 Summer Olympics in Sydney, Australia, Sandeno won the bronze medal in the 800-meter freestyle event, along with fourth place in the 400-meter individual medley and sixth place in the 200-meter butterfly.

=== 2003 U.S. Swimming Nationals ===
In 2003, while enrolled at the University of Southern California, she won the U.S. national championship in the 200-meter butterfly, and the 200- and 400-meter individual medley events.

=== 2004 Summer Olympics ===
The 2004 Summer Olympics in Athens, Greece saw Sandeno win three more Olympic medals: a silver medal in the 400-meter individual medley, a bronze medal in the 400-meter freestyle, and a gold medal in the 4×200-meter freestyle relay. The American team of Natalie Coughlin, Carly Piper, Dana Vollmer and Sandeno also broke the seventeen-year-old world record (previously held by East Germany) by more than two seconds with their victory in the 4×200-meter freestyle relay.

== Post-swimming career and media appearances ==
After failing to qualify for the 2008 U.S. Olympic Team, Sandeno announced her retirement. In May 2010, Sandeno joined with Think Physical Therapy and started a venture called Swim Tank where she will do stroke analysis for swimmers. For the 2010 Southern California swim season, Sandeno was an assistant swim coach at Mater Dei High School, a private Catholic high school in Santa Ana, California. As a high school student, Sandeno attended El Toro High School in Lake Forest.

In 2014, Sandeno called the swimming races at the Youth Olympics on NBC.

At USA Swimming 2016 Olympic Trials in Omaha, Nebraska; Sandeno served as the on-deck live emcee alongside Olympic teammate Brendan Hansen. She also hosted USA Swimming’s web-series debut of “Deck Pass Live”.

In April 2018, Sandeno joined swimming fin company Laguna Fin Co. as partner and face of the company. Laguna Fin Co. produces a unique training fin with a built-in neoprene foot pocket for comfort and an adjustable back strap for sizing. This training fin is also the only fin which can be used for all 4 competitive strokes, including breaststroke.

In 2018, Sandeno was a host at the Warrior Games, presented by The Department of Defense.

In the Summer of 2019, Sandeno released “Golden Glow. How Kaitlin Sandeno achieved Gold in the Pool and Life” with coauthor Dan D’Adonna.

Sandeno commentated at the 2023 Pan American Games as well the ParaPan Games in Santiago, Chile.

== Personal life ==
At a younger age, Sandeno swam for the Nellie Gail Saddleback Valley Gators in Orange County, California, coached by Vic and Renee Riggs. She swam as one of the top competitors in freestyle events, and helped the Gator team.

Originally from Lake Forest, Sandeno attended El Toro High School in Lake Forest, California and was a member of the El Toro High School swim team.

In September 2008, Sandeno teamed up with Anna Kournikova and Katya Myers to win the female celebrity category of the 2008 Malibu Triathlon.

On April 25, 2015, Sandeno married Peter Hogan. The couple resides in Newport Beach, California. In 2025, she gave birth to a son.

== See also ==
- List of Olympic medalists in swimming (women)
- List of World Aquatics Championships medalists in swimming (women)
- Pan American Games records in swimming
- World record progression 4 × 200 metres freestyle relay
