= Simon Rudland =

Zimbabwean businessman and entrepreneur

- Born: 1971 (age 54–55); Chinhoyi, Zimbabwe
- Citizenship: Zimbabwean
- Occupations: Business Tycoon, Investor and Entrepreneur
- Title: Founder at Gold Leaf Tobacco
- Spouse: Leigh-Ann Patricia Schoeman (m. 1992; div. 2014)
- Children: 3
- Website: www.gltc.co.za

Simon Rudland (born 1971) is a Zimbabwean businessman involved in the tobacco, logistics, and agriculture in Southern Africa. He co-founded Gold Leaf Tobacco Corporation (GLTC) and has faced allegations of involvement in gold smuggling and tax evasion.

== Early life and education ==
Simon Rudland was born in Harare, Zimbabwe, though specific details about his early life and education remain limited in public records. He is part of the influential Rudland family, which includes his brother Hamish Rudland, with whom he has collaborated on numerous business ventures.

== Career ==
=== Pioneer Corporation Africa ===
In 1995, Simon Rudland, alongside his brother Hamish, founded Pioneer Transport (now Bulwark), a logistics company that later expanded into Pioneer Corporation Africa (PCA) through the acquisition of several transport businesses, including Unifreight (owners of Swift Transport), Bulwark, and Clan.

=== Gold Leaf Tobacco Corporation ===
Rudland is a co-owner of Gold Leaf Tobacco Corporation (GLTC), a multinational tobacco company he established with Yakub Mahomed. GLTC manufactures and distributes cigarette brands such as Rudland & George (R&G), which Rudland launched in 2015. The company has operations in several countries, including Zimbabwe, South Africa, and the broader Southern African Development Community (SADC) region.

=== Investments and expansion ===
The Rudland brothers have been active investors on the Zimbabwe Stock Exchange, holding stakes in companies such as Zimre (via their investment vehicle Day River Corporation) and CFI Holdings, an agricultural firm. Simon Rudland has also overseen the construction of a US$120 million tobacco processing plant in Harare’s Aspindale industrial area, reflecting his commitment to expanding his business interests in Zimbabwe. His business portfolio spans multiple sectors, including mining, construction, logistics, general manufacturing, energy, and commodity trading, with reported investments valued at over US$1 billion.

== Alleged illicit activities ==
Simon Rudland’s career has been associated with allegations of involvement in illicit activities, including money laundering, gold smuggling, and tax evasion. Rudland has denied these allegations. In March 2006, the South African crime-fighting unit, the Scorpions, raided Mavambo, a PCA subsidiary, issuing arrest warrants for Rudland, Yakub Mahomed, and Ebrahim Adamjee. The authorities alleged that Mahomed operated cigarette manufacturing plants (Gold Leaf and Sahawi) that evaded VAT and excise duties, with Rudland implicated in laundering money through Mavambo and smuggling Sahawi cigarettes. The case was later challenged and withdrawn in the Supreme Court of Appeal."Simon Rudland". Wikipedia.

=== SARS tax evasion allegations ===
In August 2022, the South African Revenue Service (SARS) obtained a preservation order freezing the assets of Gold Leaf Tobacco Corporation (GLTC) and its directors, including Rudland, over allegations of tax evasion exceeding R3 billion, including undeclared income from illicit cigarette sales and VAT evasion. SARS alleged that GLTC laundered funds through cash-in-transit and gold companies, with assistance from officials at Sasfin Bank. In December 2023, SARS filed a R4.8 billion damages claim against Sasfin Bank, alleging the bank facilitated the laundering of R8.2 billion in untaxed funds linked to Rudland’s operations over a decade. These actions are civil in nature and focused on tax recovery. As of August 2025, no criminal convictions have been reported in relation to these allegations.

=== Gold Mafia allegations ===
In March 2023, Al Jazeera’s investigative documentary series, ‘‘Gold Mafia’’, alleged that Rudland was a key figure in a network smuggling gold from Zimbabwe and laundering money through Southern African companies, including GLTC, with links to Zimbabwean officials. The documentary claimed Rudland financed gold smuggling operations to Dubai. Rudland denied the allegations, describing them as a “smear campaign” and demanding a public apology from Al Jazeera. South African authorities, including the Hawks and National Prosecuting Authority (NPA), have faced criticism for not advancing investigations into these claims as of late 2024. As of August 2025, no convictions have resulted from these allegations, and investigations remain ongoing.

== Assassination attempt ==
On August 14, 2019, Rudland survived an assassination attempt outside the Fair Trade Independent Tobacco Association (FITA) offices in Oaklands, Johannesburg, South Africa. A gunman fired nine shots at Rudland as he arrived in his black Porsche Boxster, striking him three times—twice in the back and once in the neck, narrowly missing his spine. Rudland was hospitalized and later stated he suspected a competitor in the tobacco industry was behind the attack, though no definitive motive or perpetrator has been established. GLTC offered a R10 million reward for information leading to the arrest of those responsible.

== Personal life ==
Simon Rudland was married to Leigh-Ann Patricia Schoeman on September 3, 1992, in Harare. The couple had three children: Sarah, Hannah (born April 10, 1994), and Emma, who has special needs. Their marriage ended in divorce in November 2014, following Schoeman’s allegations of infidelity, abuse, and Rudland’s abandonment of their matrimonial home. As part of the divorce settlement, Rudland was ordered to pay US$5 million within 12 months.

Rudland’s mother, Adrienne, is a businesswoman and owner of Braemar, a company based in the United Arab Emirates. His brother, Hamish Rudland, is a key partner in many of his business endeavors.
