= List of faculty and alumni of John Carroll University =

This is a list of people associated with John Carroll University, a private Jesuit university in University Heights, Ohio. This includes faculty, alumni, staff, and former university Presidents. The university was founded as Saint Ignatius College by the Society of Jesus. The university was founded in 1886 and enrolls approximately 4,000 students per year.

== Alumni ==
=== Media ===
- Paisley Dodds – AP London Bureau chief
- Chuck Heaton – sportswriter, columnist, author and father of Patricia Heaton
- Marcello Hernandez – comedian, actor, SNL cast member
- Tim Russert – former NBC News Washington Bureau Chief; host and moderator of Meet the Press; the university's Department of Communication and Theatre Arts was renamed in his honor May 2009

=== Government ===
- Sara Bloomfield – director, United States Holocaust Memorial Museum
- Bridget M. Brennan – United States district judge, United States District Court for the Northern District of Ohio
- Rick Carfagna – state representative and assistant majority floor leader, Ohio House of Representatives
- Anthony J. Celebrezze – Federal Court of Appeals judge, US Secretary of Health, Education and Welfare, mayor of Cleveland
- Frank D. Celebrezze I – politician; brother of Anthony Celebrezze
- Anne C. Conway – judge of the United States District Court for the Middle District of Florida
- John Cranley – mayor of Cincinnati, Ohio
- Edward F. Crawford – former U.S. ambassador to Ireland
- Timothy J. DeGeeter – state representative, Ohio Legislature and mayor of Parma, Ohio
- Donald J. McConnell – former United States ambassador to Eritrea
- Tom McNamara – mayor of Rockford, Illinois
- Tom Murphy – former mayor of Pittsburgh, Pennsylvania
- Mary Rose Oakar – former congresswoman (M.A. from John Carroll University)
- Jon Powers – politician, U.S. Army captain, and founder of War Kids Relief
- Paweł Wojciechowski – Polish economist; former Polish minister of finance

=== Military ===
- Carter Ham – United States Army general
- John D. Lavelle – United States Air Force general
- Carl E. Walz – United States Air Force colonel and astronaut

=== Business ===
- James C. Boland – former vice chairman of Ernst & Young; board member of the Goodyear Tire and Rubber Company, Sherwin-Williams, Invacare and SITE Centers
- Charles Dolan – founder of Cablevision and HBO
- Timothy Donahue – former executive chairman of Sprint Nextel
- Jack Kahl – founder of Manco and the Duck Tape brand
- A. Gary Klesch — international businessman, industrialist
- Richard J. Kramer – chairman of Goodyear Tire and Rubber Company
- John Rooney – former president and CEO of U.S. Cellular

=== Sports ===
- Graham Armstrong – professional football player
- Tom Arth – professional football player
- David Caldwell – professional football manager
- Nick Caley – professional football coach
- Nick Caserio – professional football manager
- Enrique Ecker – professional football player
- London Fletcher – professional football player
- Wade Manning – professional football player
- Josh McDaniels – professional football coach
- Dominique Moceanu – Olympic gymnast, member of the Magnificent Seven at the 1996 Olympic Games, the first American gymnastics team to win Olympic gold
- Brian Polian – college football coach
- Chris Polian – professional football scout and executive
- Chuck Priefer – professional football coach
- Greg Roman – professional football coach
- Frank Ross – professional football coach
- Jerry Schuplinski – professional football coach
- Don Shula – professional football player and coach
- Carl Taseff – professional football player and coach
- Tom Telesco – professional football manager
- Dave Ziegler – professional football manager

=== Religion ===
- William Michael Cosgrove – bishop, Diocese of Belleville in Illinois
- Raymond Joseph Gallagher – bishop, Diocese of Lafayette in Indiana
- Joseph Patrick Hurley – bishop, St. Augustine, Florida; Vatican diplomat
- Donald Edmond Pelotte – bishop, Diocese of Gallup, New Mexico
- Anthony Edward Pevec – retired auxiliary bishop, Roman Catholic Diocese of Cleveland
- Anthony Pilla – retired bishop, Roman Catholic Diocese of Cleveland

=== Academia ===
- George Bosl – former chair, Department of Medicine and Clinical Oncology, Sloan Kettering
- Leonard Calabrese – rheumatologist and researcher, Cleveland Clinic
- Noel A. Clark – physicist, pioneer in liquid crystals, and professor, University of Colorado Boulder
- James Danko – president, Butler University; former dean, Villanova University School of Business
- Paul A. Fleury – dean, Yale University School of Engineering
- Germain Grisez – philosopher
- John Hardon – Jesuit priest, theologian, and intellectual
- Paul F. McManamon – scientist
- Robert L. Niehoff – Jesuit priest, president emeritus of John Carroll University
- Fred Pestello – sociologist, former president, Saint Louis University and Le Moyne University

=== Arts and entertainment ===
- Eric Carmen – singer, musician
- Brian P. Cleary – author of more than 25 children's books
- Marcello Hernández – comedian, cast member on Saturday Night Live
- Christopher Kempf – poet, professor at the University of Illinois at Urbana-Champaign
- Brian M. Love – actor, singer, puppeteer
- Dave Lucas – Poet Laureate of Ohio
- Jack Riley – comedic actor

=== Other ===
- David Ferrie – alleged by New Orleans district attorney Jim Garrison to have been involved in assassination of John F. Kennedy

== Faculty ==
- George Bilgere – poet
- Francesco Cesareo – president of Assumption College, former professor of history at John Carroll University
- Lisa Damour – psychologist and TV personality
- Vincent Dethier – insect physiologist and entomologist
- Charles Geschke – co-founder of Adobe Systems Inc.
- Philip Metres - writer, poet and essayist
- Sarah Willis – writer and novelist
