= Swimming at the 2003 World Aquatics Championships – Women's 800 metre freestyle =

Women's 800m Freestyle at the 2003 FINA World Aquatics Championships
- Venue: Palau Sant Jordi
- Dates: 25 July (prelims); 26 July (final)
- Winning time: 8 minutes 23.66 seconds

Medalists
gold medal	Hannah Stockbauer	Germany
silver medal	Diana Munz	United States
bronze medal	Rebecca Cooke	Great Britain

The Women's 800m Freestyle event at the 10th FINA World Aquatics Championships swam on 25–26 July 2003 in Barcelona, Spain. Preliminary heats swam during the morning session on July 25, with the top-8 finishers advancing to swim the race again in the Final during the evening session on July 26.

Prior to the event, the World (WR) and Championship (CR) records were:

- WR: 8:16.22 swum by Janet Evans (USA) on August 20, 1989 in Tokyo, Japan
- CR: 8:24.05 swum by Janet Evans (USA) on January 12, 1991 in Perth, Australia

== Results ==
=== Final ===
Place	Swimmer	Nation	Time	Notes
1	Hannah Stockbauer	Germany	8:23.66	CR
2	Diana Munz	USA	8:24.19	
3	Rebecca Cooke	Great Britain	8:28.45	
4	Brittany Reimer	Canada	8:28.73	
5	Jana Henke	Germany	8:30.12	
6	Éva Risztov	Hungary	8:35.70	
7	Regina Sytch	Russia	8:39.96	
8	Chen Hua	China	8:46.78	

=== Preliminaries ===
Rank	Heat+Lane	Swimmer	Nation	Time	Notes
1	H4 L5	Diana Munz	United States	8:32.44	q
2	H4 L4	Chen Hua	China	8:32.72	q
3	H4 L2	Regina Sytch	Russia	8:32.86	q
4	H4 L6	Rebecca Cooke	Great Britain	8:32.95	q
5	H3 L4	Hannah Stockbauer	Germany	8:32.98	q
6	H5 L5	Éva Risztov	Hungary	8:35.40	q
7	H3 L6	Brittany Reimer	Canada	8:35.76	q
8	H5 L4	Jana Henke	Germany	8:36.07	q
9	H5 L2	Simona Păduraru	Romania	8:36.29	
10	H3 L2	Erika Villaécija	Spain	8:36.99	
11	H5 L3	Hayley Peirsol	United States	8:38.78	
12	H3 L5	Sashiko Yamada	Japan	8:40.16	
13	H4 L1	Ai Shibata	Japan	8:40.70	
14	H5 L6	Olga Beresneva	Ukraine	8:41.23	
15	H3 L3	Amanda Pascoe	Australia	8:42.27	
16	H5 L1	Linda Mackenzie	Australia	8:43.08	
17	H3 L7	Melissa Caballero	Spain	8:43.16	
18	H2 L5	Taryn Lencoe	Canada	8:44.20	
19	H4 L3	Laure Manaudou	France	8:44.75	
20	H4 L8	Réka Nagy	Hungary	8:45.13	
21	H3 L1	Anja Čarman	Slovenia	8:45.23	
22	H3 L8	Chantal Strasser	Switzerland	8:45.74	
23	H5 L8	Jana Pechanová	Czech Republic	8:46.76	
24	H2 L3	Maria Bulakhova	Russia	8:50.99	
25	H2 L7	Kristel Köbrich	Chile	8:52.02	
26	H2 L4	Nayara Ribeiro	Brazil	8:52.22	
27	H5 L7	Marianna Lymperta	Greece	8:54.35	
28	H2 L6	Hanna Miluska	Switzerland	8:57.20	
29	H4 L7	Zhang Yan	China	8:58.11	
30	H2 L2	Marta Ferreira	Portugal	8:58.41	
31	H2 L1	Golda Marcus	El Salvador	9:15.28	
32	H1 L3	Shrone Austin	Seychelles	9:27.06	
33	H2 L8	Magdalena Sutanto	Indonesia	9:32.41	
34	H1 L5	Johana Rodriguez	Costa Rica	9:35.12	
35	H1 L4	Roberta Callus	Malta	9:49.65	
-	-	Liana Ramerison Rabenja	Madagascar	DNS	
-	-	Tojohanitra Andriamanjatoarimanana	Madagascar	DNS	
-	-	Corise Nyenimigabo	Burundi	DNS	
