= Diana Munz =

American swimmer (born 1982)

Personal information
- Full name: Diana Marie Munz
- National team: United States
- Born: June 19, 1982 (age 44) Cleveland, Ohio, U.S.
- Height: 5 ft 4 in (163 cm)
- Weight: 123 lb (56 kg)
- Spouse: Palmer DePetro 2006

Sport
- Sport: Swimming
- Strokes: Distance Freestyle
- Club: Lake Erie Silver Dolphins
- Coach: Jerry Holtry
Medal record
Women's swimming
Representing the United States
Olympic Games
| Gold medal – first place | 2000 Sydney | 4×200 m freestyle |
| Silver medal – second place | 2000 Sydney | 400 m freestyle |
| Bronze medal – third place | 2004 Athens | 800 m freestyle |
World Championships (LC)
| Gold medal – first place | 2003 Barcelona | 4×200 m freestyle |
| Silver medal – second place | 1998 Perth | 800 m freestyle |
| Silver medal – second place | 2001 Fukuoka | 800 m freestyle |
| Silver medal – second place | 2003 Barcelona | 800 m freestyle |
| Bronze medal – third place | 2001 Fukuoka | 1500 m freestyle |
| Bronze medal – third place | 2003 Barcelona | 400 m freestyle |
Pan Pacific Championships
| Gold medal – first place | 2002 Yokohama | 400 m freestyle |
| Gold medal – first place | 2002 Yokohama | 800 m freestyle |
| Gold medal – first place | 2002 Yokohama | 1500 m freestyle |
| Gold medal – first place | 2002 Yokohama | 4×200 m freestyle |
| Silver medal – second place | 1997 Fukuoka | 1500 m freestyle |
| Bronze medal – third place | 1997 Fukuoka | 400 m freestyle |
| Bronze medal – third place | 1997 Fukuoka | 800 m freestyle |

Diana Marie Munz (born June 19, 1982), later known by her married name Diana DePetro, is an American former competition swimmer and Olympic champion from Moreland Hills, Ohio. Despite a July 1999 back injury from a car accident, she won a gold and silver medal in the 2000 Olympics, and a bronze in 2004. She won numerous medals in the World Aquatics Championships and Pan Pacific Games between 1997-2003, attended John Carroll University, and in 2011 worked as a coach and aquatics director at Cleveland's Spire Institute.

The youngest of four children, Munz was born on June 18, 1982 in Cleveland, Ohio to Mrs. and Mr. Robert Munz, an ice dancer who competed at the 1964 World Figure Skating Championships.

== Early life and swimming ==
Munz attended Chagrin Falls High School, where she graduated in 2000. As a young swimmer, she swam and trained with the Lake Erie Silver Dolphins, where she was mentored by Cleveland Sports Hall of Fame Coach Jerry Holtrey. A dominating regional team, the Dolphins won every district championship, for both long and short course, for 42 years from 1969-2011, which included Munz's tenure with the team. Coach Holtrey swam two years for the University of Michigan and two years under Hall of Fame Coach James "Doc" Counsilman at Indiana. Munz attended her first Olympic trials around 1996 as an eighth grader, and started with a National team by her Freshman year in High School.

Prior to her gold medal performance in the 2000 Olympics, she was injured in a car accident in July 1999, in the summer prior to her Senior year in high School. The accident caused compression injuries in her second, third, and fourth vertebrae and a broken right shinbone. For several days following the injury, Doctors monitored her for a chance of paralysis. She later had pain at times after completing long swim sessions, but continued to train.

Recovering more quickly than expected from her Summer 1999 injury, she won the 400, 800, and 1500-meter freestyle events at the Spring Nationals in March, 2000, was voted the Outstanding Swimmer of the Meet, and took the Kiphuth Award for points, named for 40-year Yale Coach Robert J. H. Kiphuth.

== 2000, 2004 Olympics ==
She trained for the 2000 Olympics with two weeks in California, then two weeks in Brisbane, Australia. She was not pleased with her performance in the 2000 Indianapolis trials in mid-August as she placed third in the 800-meter freestyle, despite being the favorite and expecting to win the finals. She missed qualifying in the 800-meter by only .05 seconds. She did qualify for the U.S. team with her time in the 400-meter event, and was placed to compete with the U.S. 4x200 free relay team and in the 400-meter event.

Representing the United States at the 2000 Summer Olympics in Sydney, Australia at 18, she won a gold medal in the women's 4×200-meter freestyle relay and a silver medal in 400-meter freestyle. At the 2000 Olympics, the women's head coach was Richard Quick of Stanford University.

Four years later at the 2004 Olympic trials at the Long Beach Aquatic Center, she won the finals of the 800-meter freestyle with a time of 8:26.06, just edging out American Kalyn Keller of USC who placed second. She was somewhat disappointed to not qualify in the 400-meter event. At the 2004 Athens Olympics, Munz added a bronze medal to her Olympic collection with a time of 8:26.61 in the 800-meter freestyle final, coming very close to her performance at the trials. The relatively long event featured a battle between the favorite Laure Manadou, of France who led much of the way, and Ai Shibata of Japan who caught Manadou in the last 100 meters, and edged her out to take the gold. Munz battled fellow American Kalyn Keller of the University of Southern California for the bronze, and surged near the end to finish only .36 seconds before Keller. Kaitlin took a seven month break from competition after the Athens Olympics, and though she returned to training for the 2008 Olympics, she did not participate. The U.S. Olympic women's coach in the 2004 Olympics was Mark Schubert.

=== Pan Pacifics ===
One of her greatest performances in an international meet was at the 2002 Pan Pacific Championships where she demonstrated her strength in distance freestyle. She captured an impressive four freestyle gold medals, in the 400, 800, and 1,500, and also swam on the gold medal team for the 4x200 free relay. Earlier in the 1997 Pan Pacifics she took bronze medals in the 400, and 800-freestyles, and a silver in the 1500-meter freestyle.

=== World Championships ===
Over her career, she garnered six medals at the World Championships in 1998, 2001, and 2003, consisting of a gold in the 2003 4x200 free relay, and silvers in the 800 freestyle in 1998, 2001, and 2003. She also took bronze medals in the 1500-meter freestyle in 2001, and the 400-meter freestyle in 2003.

Munz attended John Carroll University, where she began courses part time in January 2001. She majored in Communications at John Carroll, marrying Palmer DePetro on August 26, 2006, and was scheduled to graduate the University in December 2006. She turned down a scholarship to the University of Arizona. In her Senior year in college, she worked part time for Cleveland's WKYC, Channel 3. Though she trained for some of her time during her attendance at John Roberts University, she did not compete with their swimming team.

As of September 2011, Munz worked as a coach and manager and had served as director at SPIRE Institute, an athletic facility in Geneva, Ohio. She had some input into the design of the facility.

== See also ==
- List of John Carroll University people
- List of Olympic medalists in swimming (women)
- List of World Aquatics Championships medalists in swimming (women)
