= Swimming at the 2003 World Aquatics Championships – Women's 400 metre freestyle =

Women's 400m Freestyle at the 2003 FINA World Aquatics Championships
- Venue: Palau Sant Jordi
- Dates: 20 July (prelims and final)
- Winning time: 4 minutes 6.75 seconds

Medalists
gold medal	Hannah Stockbauer	Germany
silver medal	Éva Risztov	Hungary
bronze medal	Diana Munz	United States

The Women's 400m Freestyle event at the 10th FINA World Aquatics Championships swam on 20 July 2003 in Barcelona, Spain. Preliminary heats swam during the day's morning session, with the top-8 finishers advancing to swim again in the Final during the evening session.

Prior to the event, the World (WR) and Championship (CR) records were:

- WR: 4:03.85 swum by Janet Evans (USA) on September 22, 1988, in Seoul, South Korea
- CR: 4:06.28 swum by Tracey Wickham (Australia) on August 24, 1978, in Berlin, Germany

== Results ==
=== Final ===
Place	Swimmer	Nation	Time	Notes
1	Hannah Stockbauer	Germany	4:06.75	
2	Éva Risztov	Hungary	4:07.24	
3	Diana Munz	USA	4:07.67	
4	Elka Graham	Australia	4:08.60	
5	Brittany Reimer	Canada	4:09.34	
6	Lindsay Benko	USA	4:09.82	
7	Simona Păduraru	Romania	4:13.62	
8	Hua Chen	China	4:13.75	

=== Preliminaries ===
Rank	Heat+Lane	Swimmer	Nation	Time	Notes
1	H5 L5	Hannah Stockbauer	Germany	4:09.78	q
2	H5 L4	Diana Munz	United States	4:09.90	q
3	H6 L4	Éva Risztov	Hungary	4:10.41	q
4	H5 L6	Elka Graham	Australia	4:10.58	q
5	H6 L5	Hua Chen	China	4:11.07	q
5	H6 L3	Simona Păduraru	Romania	4:11.07	q
7	H4 L5	Lindsay Benko	United States	4:11.20	q
8	H4 L6	Brittany Reimer	Canada	4:11.55	q
9	H4 L4	Sashiko Yamada	Japan	4:12.29	
10	H5 L3	Jana Henke	Germany	4:12.32	
11	H6 L2	Zoi Dimoschaki	Greece	4:12.48	
12	H6 L6	Rebecca Cooke	Great Britain	4:12.51	
13	H4 L3	Laure Manaudou	France	4:12.66	
14	H5 L7	Ai Shibata	Japan	4:13.78	
15	H6 L7	Regina Sytch	Russia	4:13.79	
16	H5 L2	Erika Villaécija	Spain	4:14.10	
17	H4 L2	Linda Mackenzie	Australia	4:14.36	
18	H5 L1	Melissa Caballero	Spain	4:14.47	
19	H3 L4	Mariana Brochado	Brazil	4:15.29	
20	H3 L5	Chantal Strasser	Switzerland	4:15.44	
21	H6 L1	Daria Parshina	Russia	4:15.63	
22	H4 L8	Anja Čarman	Slovenia	4:16.70	
23	H3 L3	Marianna Lymperta	Greece	4:17.42	
24	H3 L2	Vesna Stojanvoska	Macedonia	4:17.52	
25	H5 L8	Jingzhi Tang	China	4:17.77	
26	H6 L8	Melissa Corfe	South Africa	4:18.41	
27	H4 L7	Monique Ferreira	Brazil	4:18.90	
28	H4 L1	Jana Pechanová	Czech Republic	4:18.93	
29	H3 L8	Alison Fitch	New Zealand	4:20.38	
30	H3 L6	Olga Beresneva	Ukraine	4:23.03	
31	H3 L1	Pilin Tachakittiraran	Thailand	4:23.80	
32	H1 L5	Maria Albert	Estonia	4:24.08	
33	H2 L5	Kristel Köbrich	Chile	4:24.53	
34	H3 L7	Marta Ferreira	Portugal	4:25.38	
35	H2 L3	Golda Marcus	El Salvador	4:28.03	
36	H2 L1	Johana Rodriguez	Costa Rica	4:36.43	
37	H2 L2	Magdalena Sutanto	Indonesia	4:37.45	
38	H2 L4	Andrea De León	Uruguay	4:39.07	
39	H2 L7	Roberta Callus	Malta	4:42.71	
40	H2 L6	Sivranjani Vaidyanathan	India	4:42.89	
41	H1 L4	Man Wai Fong	Macau	4:50.53	
-	-	Corise Nyenimigabo	Burundi	DNS	
