= Robert Niehoff =

Robert Niehoff may refer to:

- Robert Niehoff (American football), American football defensive back
- Robert L. Niehoff, president of John Carroll University
