= Sarah Willis =

Sarah Willis may refer to:

- Sarah Willis (hornist)
- Sarah Willis (author)
