= Swimming at the 2001 World Aquatics Championships – Women's 1500 metre freestyle =

Women's 1500-metre freestyle at the 2001 FINA World Championships
- Dates: 27 July 2001 (heats); 28 July 2001 (final)
- Competitors: 26
- Winning time: 16 minutes 1.02 seconds

Medalists
gold medal	Hannah Stockbauer	Germany
silver medal	Flavia Rigamonti	Switzerland
bronze medal	Diana Munz	United States

The women's 1500-metre freestyle event at the 2001 World Aquatic Championships took place 28 July. The heats took place 27 July, and the final was held on 28 July.

== Records ==
Prior to the competition, the existing world and championship records were as follows:

World record	Janet Evans (USA)	15:52.10	Orlando, United States	26 March 1988
Championship record	New event			

The following record was established during the competition:

Date	Round	Name	Nation	Time	Record
27 July 2001	Heats	Hannah Stockbauer	Germany	16:14.51	CR
28 July 2001	Final	Hannah Stockbauer	Germany	16:01.02	CR

== Results ==
=== Heats ===
Rank	Swimmer	Nation	Time	Notes
1	Hannah Stockbauer	Germany	16:14.51	Q, CR
2	Diana Munz	United States	16:17.08	Q
3	Amanda Pascoe	Australia	16:21.75	Q
4	Kaitlin Sandeno	United States	16:21.80	Q
5	Rebecca Cooke	United Kingdom	16:22.41	Q
6	Flavia Rigamonti	Switzerland	16:27.91	Q
7	Sachiko Yamada	Japan	16:31.60	Q
8	Nayara Ribeiro	Brazil	16:32.18	Q
9	Nathalie Brown	United Kingdom	16:32.29	
10	Chen Hua	China	16:34.22	
11	Irina Oufimtseva	Russia	16:34.27	
12	Jana Pechanová	Czech Republic	16:36.02	
13	Peggy Buchse	Germany	16:38.23	
14	Hayley Lewis	Australia	16:41.43	
15	Hana Netrefová	Czech Republic	16:43.71	
16	Chantal Strasser	Switzerland	16:45.60	
17	Yumi Kida	Japan	16:46.30	
18	Alexandra Malanina	Russia	16:49.52	
19	Ivanka Moralieva	Bulgaria	16:55.53	
20	Patricia Villareal	Mexico	16:56.10	
21	Marianna Lymperta	Greece	16:59.36	
22	Fabiana Susini	Italy	17:10.35	
23	Cecilia Biagioli	Argentina	17:16.07	
24	Lin Chi-Chan	Chinese Taipei	17:23.01	
25	Kuan Chia-Hsien	Chinese Taipei	18:03.52	
26	Shun Kwan Andrea Chum	Macau	18:49.15	

=== Final ===
Rank	Name	Nationality	Time	Notes
1st place, gold medalist(s)	Hannah Stockbauer	Germany	16:01.02	CR
2nd place, silver medalist(s)	Flavia Rigamonti	Switzerland	16:05.99	
3rd place, bronze medalist(s)	Diana Munz	United States	16:07.05	
4	Amanda Pascoe	Australia	16:16.80	
5	Rebecca Cooke	United Kingdom	16:20.15	
6	Kaitlin Sandeno	United States	16:28.91	
7	Sachiko Yamada	Japan	16:34.43	
8	Nayara Ribeiro	Brazil	16:40.37	

Key: WR = World record
