= Swimming at the 2001 World Aquatics Championships – Women's 800 metre freestyle =

Women's 800-metre freestyle at the 2001 FINA World Championships
- Dates: 22 July 2001 (heats); 23 July 2001 (final)
- Competitors: 24
- Winning time: 8 minutes 24.66 seconds

Medalists
gold medal	Hannah Stockbauer	Germany
silver medal	Diana Munz	United States
bronze medal	Kaitlin Sandeno	United States

The women's 800-metre freestyle event at the 2001 World Aquatic Championships took place 23 July. The heats took place 22 July, and the final was held on 23 July.

== Records ==
Prior to the competition, the existing world and championship records were as follows:

World record	Janet Evans (USA)	8:16.22	Tokyo, Japan	20 August 1989
Championship record	Janet Evans (USA)	8:24.05	Perth, Australia	12 January 1991

== Results ==
=== Heats ===
Rank	Swimmer	Nation	Time	Notes
1	Hannah Stockbauer	Germany	8:31.79	Q
2	Diana Munz	United States	8:33.09	Q
3	Kaitlin Sandeno	United States	8:35.51	Q
4	Jana Pechanová	Czech Republic	8:36.87	Q
5	Rebecca Cooke	United Kingdom	8:37.21	Q
6	Sachiko Yamada	Japan	8:37.27	Q
7	Chen Hua	China	8:37.52	Q
8	Flavia Rigamonti	Switzerland	8:40.33	Q
9	Irina Oufimtseva	Russia	8:40.55	
10	Camelia Potec	Romania	8:41.35	
11	Charlene Benzie	Australia	8:43.60	
12	Amanda Pascoe	Australia	8:43.79	
13	Nayara Ribeiro	Brazil	8:43.85	
14	Chantal Strasser	Switzerland	8:44.78	
15	Yumi Kida	Japan	8:44.95	
16	Alexandra Malanina	Russia	8:47.54	
17	Marianna Lymperta	Greece	8:47.61	
18	Fabiana Susini	Italy	8:48.62	
19	Peggy Buchse	Germany	8:50.47	
20	Cecilia Biagioli	Argentina	8:54.00	
21	Patricia Villareal	Mexico	8:54.49	
22	Ivanka Moralieva	Bulgaria	9:01.22	
23	Lin Chi-Chan	Chinese Taipei	9:01.74	
24	Kuan Chia-Hsien	Chinese Taipei	9:28.82	

=== Final ===
Rank	Name	Nationality	Time	Notes
1st place, gold medalist(s)	Hannah Stockbauer	Germany	8:24.66	
2nd place, silver medalist(s)	Diana Munz	United States	8:28.84	
3rd place, bronze medalist(s)	Kaitlin Sandeno	United States	8:31.45	
4	Chen Hua	China	8:31.66	
5	Flavia Rigamonti	Switzerland	8:33.79	
6	Rebecca Cooke	United Kingdom	8:36.67	
7	Jana Pechanová	Czech Republic	8:39.32	
8	Sachiko Yamada	Japan	8:45.05	

Key: WR = World record
