= Miles Lerman =

American activist (1920–2008)

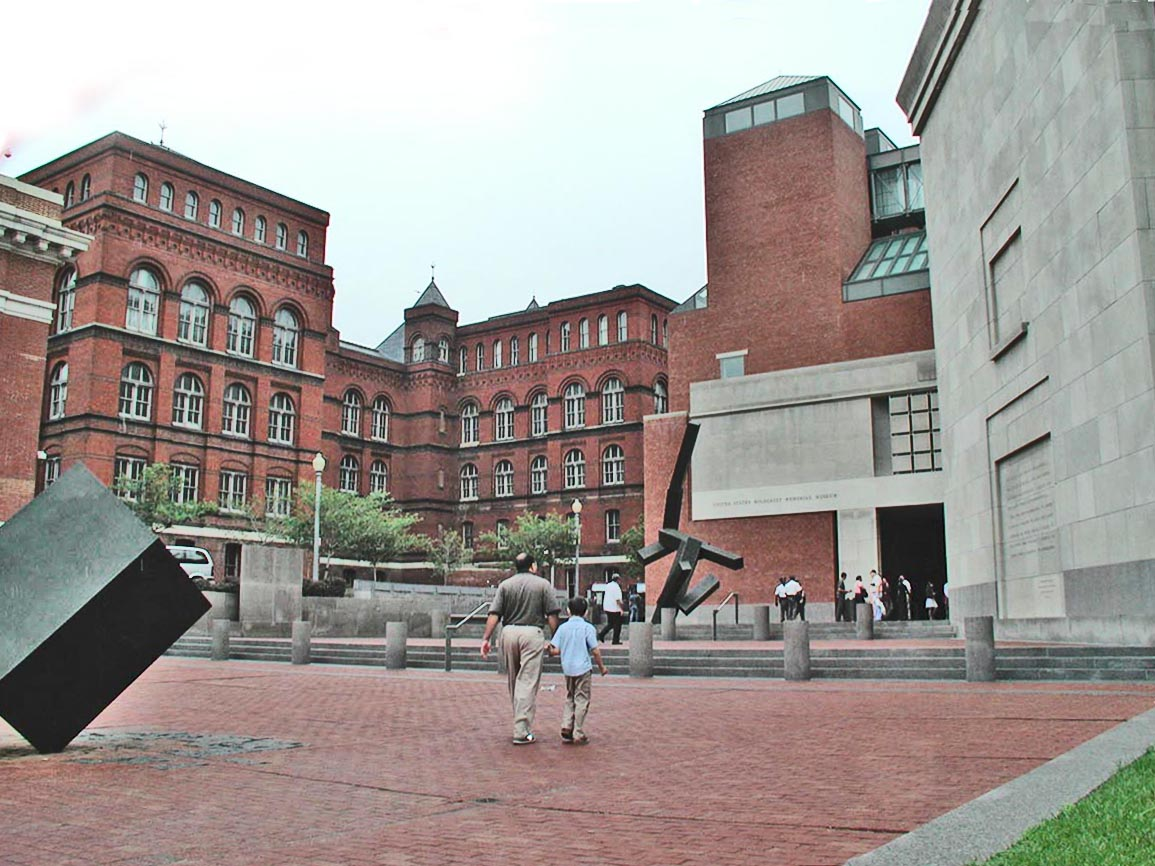
Lerman was a key figure in the creation of the United States Holocaust Museum

Miles Lerman (January 6, 1920 – January 22, 2008) was an American activist who helped plan and create both the United States Holocaust Memorial Museum in Washington, D.C., and the memorial at the Bełżec extermination camp. Lerman, a Holocaust survivor himself, had fought as a Jewish resistance fighter during World War II in Nazi German occupied Poland.

== Early life ==
Lerman was born as Szmuel Milek Lerman in Tomaszów Lubelski, Poland, in 1920. His parents were Israel and Yochevet Feldzon Lerman and he was one of five children. His mother, Yochevet, owned an import and export grocery business. His father, Israel, owned several businesses throughout eastern Poland, including several flour mills in Eastern Poland and wholesale liquor and gasoline businesses.

Lerman and his family fled to the city of Lwów following the Nazi invasion of Poland in 1939. In 1941 Lerman was captured and sent to the Vinniki forced labor camp. However, he managed to escape the camp. He spent the next 23 months as a Jewish resistance fighter hidden in the forests surrounding Lwów.

He went to the Polish city of Łódź following the end of the war. There he met his wife, Krysia Rozalia Laks, whom he married in a Displaced Persons camp. The couple emigrated together to the United States in 1947.

Lerman arrived in New York City in 1947 before moving to Vineland, New Jersey, in 1948. Lerman purchased a poultry farm in Vineland. He also started a series of successful real estate, gasoline and heating businesses.

== United States Holocaust Memorial Museum ==
Miles Lerman's involvement with the United States Holocaust Museum can be traced to 1979. That year, United States President Jimmy Carter named Lerman to the President's Commission advisory board on the Holocaust. One of the commission's main tasks was the creation of a museum dedicated to the remembrance of the Holocaust.

The United States Congress passed a legislation granting land on the National Mall in Washington D.C. for the purpose of building the museum. However, all funds for the construction of the museum had to be raised privately.

Lerman, who became chairman of the Campaign to Remember, and the committee managed to raise $190 million in order to construct and endow the United States Holocaust Memorial Museum. He also served simultaneously as the chairman of the future museum's International Relations Committee, which was charged with negotiating with Eastern European nations in order to obtain artifacts focusing on Jewish life and the Holocaust for the museum's permanent collection. Lerman's IR Committee managed to obtain a number of important artifacts, including actual barracks from the Birkenau concentration camp, a railroad boxcar used to transport Jewish prisoners to Treblinka, over 5,000 shoes from Majdanek and various toothbrushes, suitcases and other personal items from Auschwitz.

Lerman served as chairman of the United States Holocaust Memorial Museum's governing board from the time of its opening on April 22, 1993, until he left the museum in 2000. Additionally, Lerman helped to found the museum's Committee on Conscience, which works to draw attention to contemporary genocide issues, such as the current Darfur crisis.

Lerman, who spoke several languages, returned to his native Poland following his departure from the museum in 2000. There he campaigned for a proper memorial for his family members (both his parents perished in Belzec), as well as the other estimated 500,000 Jews who died at the Belzec extermination camp. The existing Communist era memorial, which stood in a former garbage dump, made no mention of Jewish Holocaust victims. Lerman raised approximately 5 million dollars to build a new memorial by teaming up with the Polish government and the American Jewish Committee.

Miles Lerman spoke at the dedication of the new Belzec memorial, which was held on June 3, 2004, telling the story of 9 year old Deborah Katz, one of the death camp's estimated 500,000 to 600,000 victims.

== Death ==
Miles Lerman died at his home in Philadelphia, Pennsylvania, on January 22, 2008, at the age of 88. He was buried in Alliance Cemetery in Vineland, New Jersey.

He was survived by his wife, Chris, whose real name is Krysia Rozalia Laks, his daughter, philanthropist Jeanette Lerman-Neubauer; his son David and his brother, Jona.
