= Hannah Stockbauer =

German swimmer (born 1982)

Personal information
- Full name: Hannah Stockbauer
- Nationality: Germany
- Born: 7 January 1982 (age 44) Nuremberg, West Germany
- Height: 1.74 m (5 ft 9 in)
- Weight: 63 kg (139 lb)

Sport
- Sport: Swimming
- Strokes: Freestyle
- Club: SSG 81 Erlangen
Medal record
Olympic Games
Bronze medal – third place	2004 Athens	4 × 200 m free relay
World Championships
Gold medal – first place	2001 Fukuoka	800 m freestyle
Gold medal – first place	2001 Fukuoka	1500 m freestyle
Gold medal – first place	2003 Barcelona	400 m freestyle
Gold medal – first place	2003 Barcelona	800 m freestyle
Gold medal – first place	2003 Barcelona	1500 m freestyle
Silver medal – second place	2001 Fukuoka	4 × 200 m free relay
Bronze medal – third place	2001 Fukuoka	400 m freestyle
European Championships
Gold medal – first place	1999 Istanbul	800 m freestyle
Gold medal – first place	1999 Istanbul	4 × 200 m free relay
Gold medal – first place	2002 Berlin	4 × 200 m free relay
Bronze medal – third place	2002 Berlin	800 m freestyle
Short Course Europeans
Bronze medal – third place	2002 Riesa	400 m freestyle
Bronze medal – third place	2002 Riesa	800 m freestyle

Hannah Stockbauer (German pronunciation: [ˈhana ˈʃtɔkˌbaʊ̯ɐ]; born 7 January 1982) is a World Champion, Olympic and national-record holding swimmer from Germany. In 2003, she was named the female World Swimmer of the Year by Swimming World Magazine, following her winning the 400, 800 and 1500 freestyles at the 2003 World Championships.

She swam for Germany at the:

- Olympics: 2000, 2004
- World Championships: 2001, 2003
- European Championships: 1999, 2002
- Short Course Europeans: 1998, 2002

At the 2001 World Championships, she won the 800 and 1500 frees.

At the 2003 World Championships, she was named Female Swimmer of the Meet, after she won 3 events (400, 800 and 1500 frees), setting meet records in the 800 and 1500 (8:23.66 and 16:00.18) and the German Record in the 1500.

At the 2004 Olympics, she was part of the Germany relay that won a bronze medal in the 4 × 200 m Free Relay.

She retired from competition in October 2005.

Awards
Preceded by (Germany) Heike Drechsler	German Sportswoman of the Year; 2001	Succeeded by (Germany) Franziska van Almsick
Preceded by (Germany) Franziska van Almsick	German Sportswoman of the Year; 2003	Succeeded by (Germany) Birgit Fischer
Preceded by (United States) Natalie Coughlin	World Swimmer of the Year; 2003	Succeeded by (Ukraine) Yana Klochkova
Preceded by (Germany) Franziska van Almsick	European Swimmer of the Year; 2003	Succeeded by (Ukraine) Yana Klochkova
