= Brian M. Love =

American actor

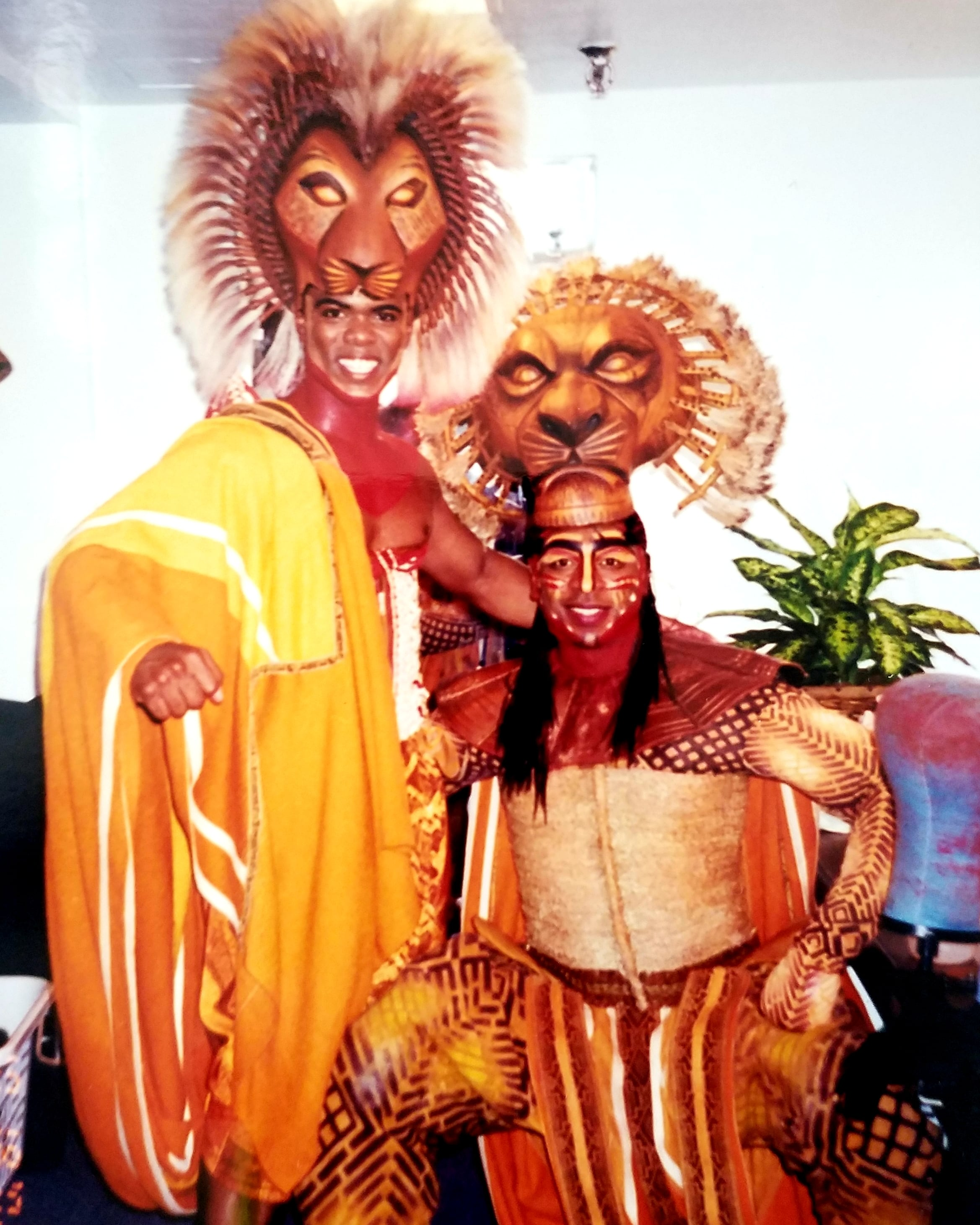
Brian Love (left) and Alton Fitzgerald White (right) backstage in costume as Simba and Mufasa in Disney's The Lion King.

Brian M. Love (born December 12, 1973) is an American actor, singer, puppeteer, and martial artist. He is best known for his stage roles as Simba (understudy) in Disney's The Lion King and E.F. (Frank) Farrington in the world premiere of Brooklyn's Bridge.

On television, Love has appeared in multiple national commercials including National Football League (NFL) Fantasy Football, and the United States Golf Association (USGA). Love has also worked with entertainment icon Jerry Lewis, performing as a singer on his annual Jerry Lewis MDA Labor Day Telethon.

As a recording artist, Love has sung for and worked with Motown trailblazers Berry Gordy and Stevie Wonder. With Wonder, he was part of his ensemble arrangement recording of Jonathan Larson's "Seasons of Love" from the musical RENT. Love also was a member of the South African singing ensemble that recorded the 2010 FIFA World Cup Theme for ESPN.

His stage appearances include the Broadway cast of The Lion King - the Tony Award and Grammy Award-winning highest grossing Broadway production of all time, the Gazelle Tour of The Lion King, the 1st and 2nd National Tours of Jonathan Larson's RENT (Angel and Benny Tours, respectively), and the Sister Act National Tour - produced by Whoopi Goldberg. In 2022, Love also had the opportunity to play the role of Sebastian in Hale Centre Theatre's production of Disney's The Little Mermaid, a performance that earned him a 2023 Broadway World Award Nomination for Best Performer in A Musical.

== Early life and education ==
Born and raised in Lorain, Ohio. His father, Houston Love, Jr., the grandson of a slave and son of a sharecropper, is a retired career educator and administrator. His mother, Laurel Ann Love (nee Jennings) is a retired social worker and musician.

Love attended Admiral King High School, lettering in both baseball and basketball and performing in every school musical and talent show in his junior and senior years. He graduated from John Carroll University in Cleveland with a degree in Communications and English and would later complete some graduate work at Boston University. Formal Voice Training: Seth Riggs, who created and teaches the Speech Level Singing Technique and has worked with recording performers such as Prince, Michael Jackson, Stevie Wonder, James Ingram, Ray Charles, George Michael, Madonna, Bette Midler, and Barbra Streisand.

== Career ==
=== Theater ===
Brian Love has built a distinguished career in theater, performing on Broadway, in four national tours, and in numerous regional productions. His notable stage credits include:

- Disney's The Lion King (Broadway, Minskoff Theatre) – Swing and Simba Understudy, covering 13 roles. Directed by Julie Taymor, with choreography by Garth Fagan and music by Hans Zimmer, Lebo M., Mark Mancina, and Jay Rifkin. Original songs by Elton John and Tim Rice.
- The Lion King (1st National U.S. Tour, Gazelle Company) – Original company member, playing the same roles as on Broadway.
- RENT (1st and 2nd National Tours) – Principal role of Benjamin Coffin III, directed by Michael Greif.
- Brooklyn's Bridge (Dr. Phillips Center, World Premiere)] – Originated the role of E.F. (Frank) Farrington. The Orlando Sentinel praised his performance, stating, "Brian Love lights up the stage with each appearance... thrillingly makes the most of the most entertaining songs."
- Disney's The Little Mermaid (Hale Center Theatre) – Principal role of Sebastian.
- Calendar Girls (Theatre West End, regional) – Portrayed John Clarke. The Orlando Sentinel noted his performance was "played with warmth and grit."
- Beauty and the Beast (Maltz Jupiter Theatre, regional) – Bookseller, puppeteer, and fight captain. Directed by John Tartaglia with choreography by Shannon Lewis.
- Kiss of the Spiderwoman (Beck Center for the Arts regional) – Principal role of Valentin, directed by Scott Spence.
- Ain't Misbehavin' (Beck Center for Performing Arts, regional) – Directed by Scott Spence.
- The All-Night Strut (The Hanna Theatre, Cleveland's Playhouse Square)
- Big River (Cain Park Evans Amphitheater) – Principal role of Jim, directed by Victoria Bussert.
- Scott Joplin’s Treemonisha (Opera Orlando, Florida premiere) – Portrayed Zodzetrick in the Opera Orlando production.
- Finding Our Way Back (Winter Park Playhouse, Festival of New Musicals workshop) – Played Mr. Jackson in this new musical featured at the Florida Festival of New Musicals.
- Catch Me If You Can (Osceola Arts, regional) – Portrayed Carl Hanratty in the production at Osceola Arts.

=== Film and television ===
Love has appeared in national television commercials and theater-filmed adaptations, including:

- The Ten Commandments – An American stage-filmed adaptation of Elie Chouraqui's originally directed French production. The cast included Val Kilmer, Nita Whitaker, Alisan Porter, and Adam Lambert. Directed by Robert Iscove and choreographed by Travis Payne, the production was performed at the Kodak Theatre (now Dolby Theatre) in Los Angeles.
- The Jerry Lewis MDA Labor Day Telethon – Performed as a singer on the nationally televised fundraiser.
- NFL Fantasy Football Commercial – Appeared in a national commercial alongside David Johnson and Mike Evans.
- USGA Golf Commercial – Featured in a Time-Friendly campaign.

=== Music ===
Love has collaborated with notable musicians, including Berry Gordy and Stevie Wonder. He participated in Wonder's ensemble arrangement of "Seasons of Love" from the musical RENT and was a South African singing ensemble member for ESPN's 2010 FIFA World Cup theme.

=== Notable performances and reception ===
Brian Love has been recognized for his dynamic stage presence, expressive performances and strong vocal ability. His performances in Brooklyn's Bridge and Calendar Girls received critical praise, with the Orlando Sentinel highlighting his contributions to both productions.

== Awards and nominations ==
- 2023 BroadwayWorld Salt Lake City Awards – A two-time nominee - recognized for Best Performer in a Musical for the role of Sebastian, and part of the winning cast for Best Ensemble in a Musical for The Little Mermaid.

== Theatre credits ==
The following is a list of Brian M. Love's notable stage credits.

Year	Production	Role	Category / Theatre
1997	Big River	Jim	Cain Park
1997	All Night Strut	Baritone	Cleveland Playhouse Square
1997	Ain’t Misbehavin	"Ken"	Beck Center for the Arts
1998	Kiss of the Spiderwoman	Valentin	Beck Center for the Arts
1998–1999	RENT	Benjamin Coffin III	1st National Tour
1999–2001	RENT	Benjamin Coffin III	2nd National Tour
2002–2004	The Lion King	Swing, Simba U/S, Banzai U/S	Gazelle Tour
2004	The Ten Commandments	Ensemble	Kodak Theatre
2005–2012	The Lion King	Swing, Simba U/S, Banzai U/S	Broadway
2013–2014	Sister Act	Cop, Eddie U/S, Curtis U/S, TJ U/S	1st National Tour
2018	Beauty and the Beast	Bookseller, Puppeteer, Fight Captain	Maltz Jupiter Theatre
2021	The Little Mermaid	Sebastian	Hale Centre Theatre
2023	Brooklyn’s Bridge	E.F. (Frank) Farrington	Concert, Dr. Phillips Center
2024–2025	Calendar Girls	John Clark	Theatre West End
2025	Brooklyn’s Bridge	E.F. (Frank) Farrington	Dr. Phillips Center
2025	Scott Joplin’s Treemonisha	Zodzetrick	Opera Orlando
2025	Finding Our Way Back	Mr. Jackson	Workshop, Winter Park Playhouse
2025	Catch Me If You Can	Carl Hanratty	Osceola Arts
