= Sara J. Bloomfield =

Director of the USHMM

Director of the United States Holocaust Memorial Museum
- Incumbent
- Assumed office 1999

Personal details
- Born: Cleveland, Ohio, US
- Education: Northwestern University (B.A.); John Carroll University (M.Ed.)

Sara J. Bloomfield is the director of the United States Holocaust Memorial Museum. She is originally from Cleveland, Ohio. Bloomfield holds a Bachelor of Arts degree in English literature from Northwestern University and a master's degree in Education from John Carroll University.

Bloomfield joined the planning staff of the Museum in 1986 and she singled out Dr. Joan Ringelheim in making “a very critical role in the creation” of the museum's permanent exhibit before it opened in 1993.

Bloomfield became director in 1999. Bloomfield currently serves on the board of the Auschwitz-Birkenau Foundation and is a former member of the board of the International Council of Museums. Bloomfield has contributed to The Times of Israel blog, HuffPost, and The Independent.
