= United States Holocaust Memorial Museum =

Museum in Washington, D.C., U.S.

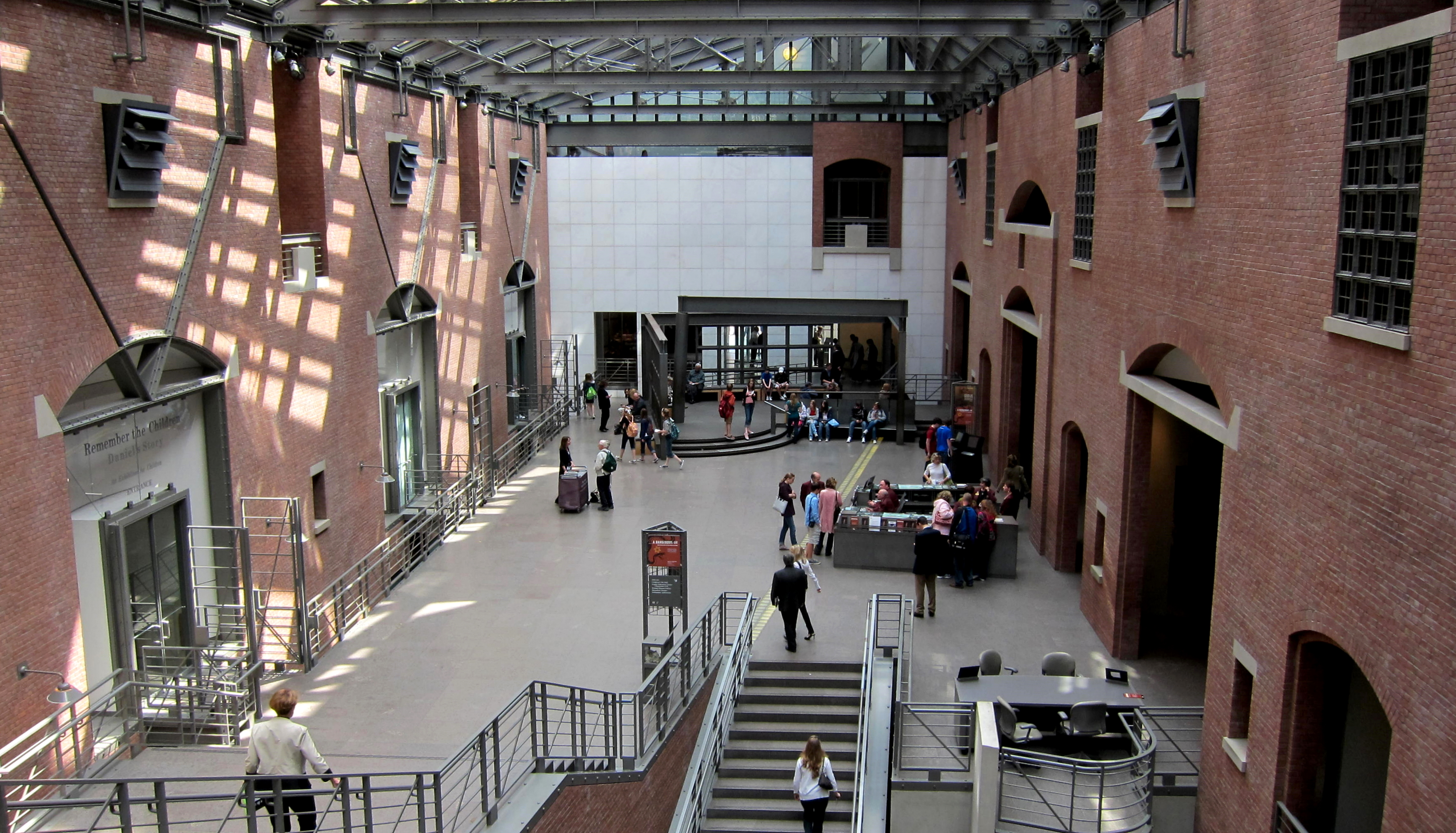
- Interior of the museum in 2010

- Location in Washington, D.C. United States Holocaust Memorial Museum (the United States)
- Established: April 22, 1993
- Location: 100 Raoul Wallenberg Place, Southwest, Washington, D.C.
- Coordinates: 38°53′12″N 77°01′57″W
- Type: Holocaust museum
- Visitors: 1.6 million (2016)
- Director: Sara J. Bloomfield
- Curator: Steven Luckert
- Public transit access: Smithsonian
- Website: www.ushmm.org

The United States Holocaust Memorial Museum (USHMM) is the United States' official memorial and museum dedicated to the history and legacy of the Holocaust. Opened in Washington, D.C. in 1993, the museum explores the Holocaust through permanent and traveling exhibitions, educational programs, survivor testimonies and archival collections. The USHMM was created with the stated purpose of helping leaders and citizens of the world confront hatred, prevent genocide, promote human dignity, and strengthen democracy.

The museum sits between 14th and 15th streets SW in Washington, D.C. with the portion of 15th street renamed Raoul Wallenberg Place. This address is in memory of Raoul Wallenberg who was a Swedish architect, businessman, diplomat, and humanitarian.

== Overview ==
In 2008, the museum had an operating budget of $120.6 million, a staff of about 400 employees, 125 contractors, 650 volunteers, 91 Holocaust survivors, and 175,000 members. It has local offices in New York City, Boston, Boca Raton, Chicago, Los Angeles, and Dallas.

As of 2024, the museum had received nearly 50 million visitors since its opening on April 22, 1993, including more than 11 million schoolchildren, 120 heads of state, and more than 3,500 foreign officials from over 132 countries and territories. According to the museum, visitors have come from all over the world, and fewer than 10 percent are Jewish. In 2024, the museum’s website received 33.9 million visits from 243 countries and territories, 57 percent of them from outside the United States.

The USHMM's collections contain more than 12,750 artifacts, 49 million pages of archival documents, 85,000 historical photographs, a list of over 200,000 registered survivors and their families, 1,000 hours of archival footage, 93,000 library items, and 9,000 oral history testimonies. Currently, USHMM's Teacher Fellowship Program has 268 fellows representing 49 states in the United States, the District of Columbia, and 11 countries. Since 1994, the museum has had almost 400 university fellows from 26 countries.

Researchers at the United States Holocaust Memorial Museum have documented 42,500 ghettos and concentration camps created by the Nazis throughout German-controlled areas of Europe from 1933 to 1945.

The museum is located geographically in the same cluster as the Smithsonian museums.

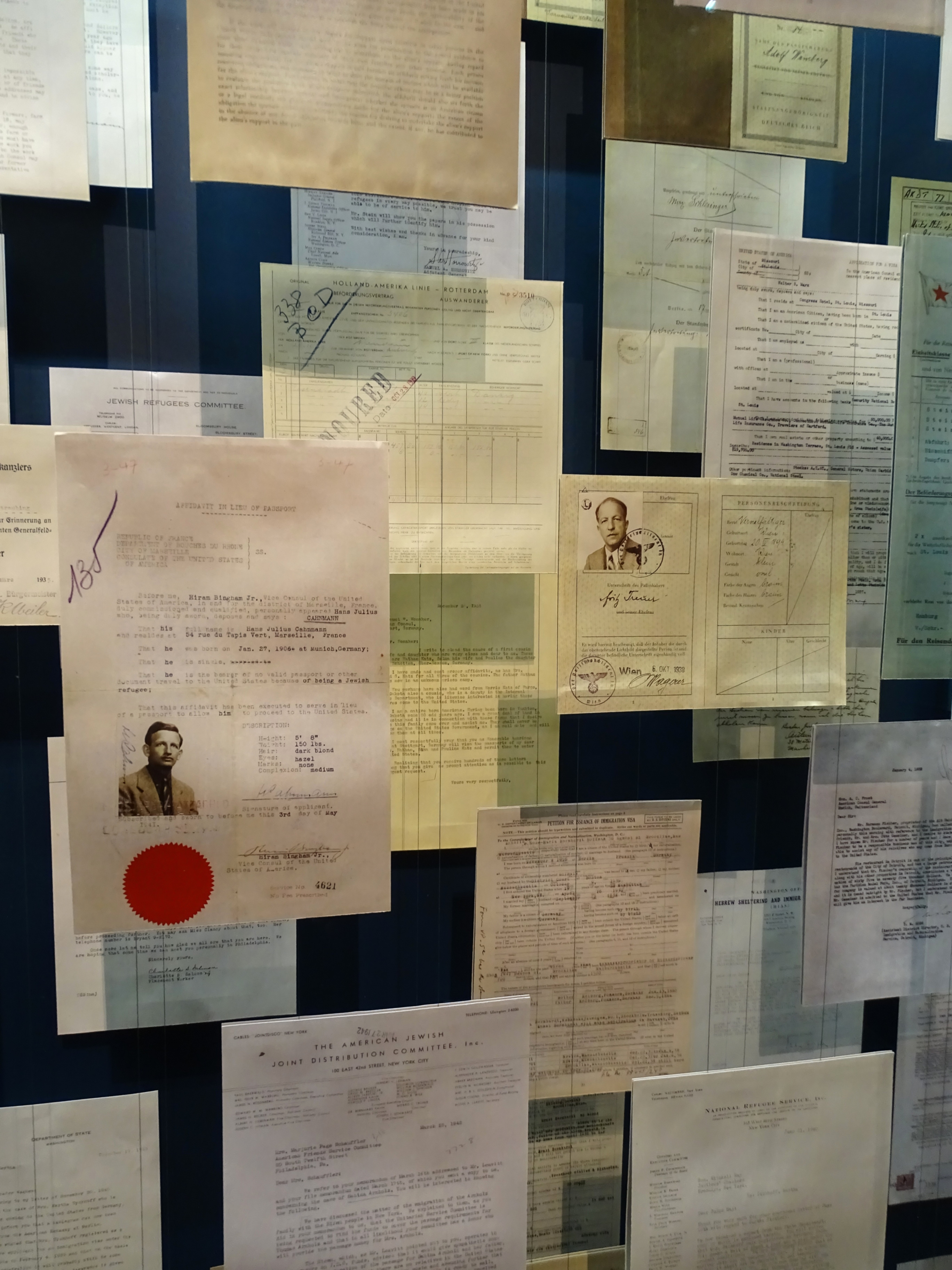
From 1933 to 1945, about 200,000 Jewish refugees escaped to the United States.

== History ==
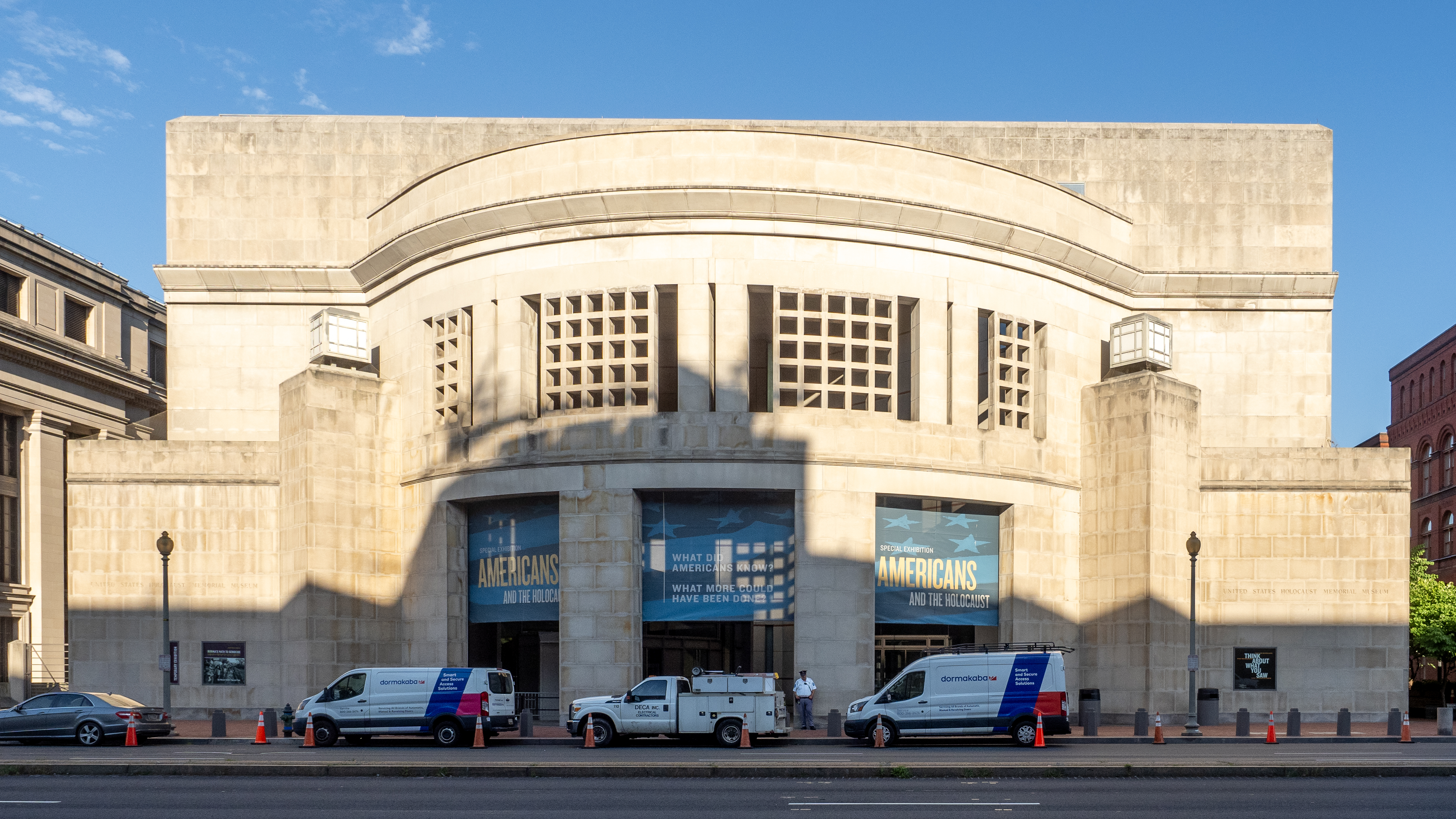
14th Street entrance of USHMM

On November 1, 1978, President Jimmy Carter established the President's Commission on the Holocaust, chaired by Elie Wiesel, a prominent author, activist, and Holocaust survivor. Its mandate was to investigate the creation and maintenance of a memorial to victims of the Holocaust and an appropriate annual commemoration to them. The mandate was a joint effort of Wiesel and Richard Krieger (the original papers are on display at the Jimmy Carter Museum). On September 27, 1979, the commission presented its report to the President, recommending the establishment of a national Holocaust memorial museum in Washington, D.C., with three main components: a national museum/memorial, an educational foundation, and a Committee on Conscience.

After a unanimous vote by the United States Congress in 1980 to establish the museum, the federal government made available 1.9 acres (0.77 ha) of land adjacent to the Washington Monument for construction. Under the founding director Richard Krieger, subsequent director Jeshajahu Weinberg and Chairman Miles Lerman, nearly $190 million was raised from private sources for building design, artifact acquisition, and exhibition creation. In October 1988, President Ronald Reagan helped lay the cornerstone of the building, designed by architect James Ingo Freed. Dedication ceremonies on April 22, 1993, included speeches by American president Bill Clinton, Israeli president Chaim Herzog, Chairman Harvey Meyerhoff, and Elie Wiesel. On April 26, 1993, the museum opened to the general public. Its first visitor was the 14th Dalai Lama of Tibet.

=== Attacks ===
In 2002, a federal jury convicted white supremacists Leo Felton and Erica Chase of planning to bomb a series of institutions associated with American Black and Jewish communities, including the USHMM.

On June 10, 2009, 88-year-old James von Brunn, an antisemite, shot Museum Special Police Officer Stephen Tyrone Johns. Special Police Officer Johns and von Brunn were seriously wounded and transported by ambulance to the George Washington University Hospital. Special Police Officer Johns later died of his injuries; he is permanently honored in an official memorial at the USHMM. Von Brunn, who had a previous criminal record, died before the conclusion of his federal criminal trial, in Butner federal prison in North Carolina.

== Exhibitions ==
The USHMM houses two exhibitions open continuously since 1993 as well as rotating exhibitions on topics related to the Holocaust and human rights.

=== Hall of Remembrance ===
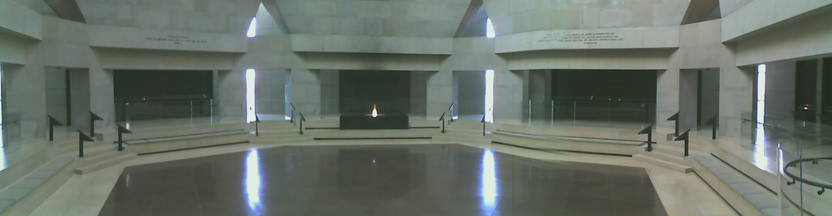
Panoramic view of the Hall of Remembrance

The Hall of Remembrance is the USHMM's official memorial to the victims and survivors of the Holocaust. Visitors can light candles and view the eternal flame in the hexagonal hall.

=== Permanent Exhibition ===
Using more than 900 artifacts, 70 video monitors, and four theaters showing historic film footage and eyewitness testimonies, the USHMM's Permanent Exhibition is the most visited exhibit at the Museum. Upon entering large industrial elevators on the first floor, visitors are given identification cards, each of which tells the story of a person such as a random victim or survivor of the Holocaust. Upon exiting these elevators on the fourth floor, visitors walk through a chronological history of the Holocaust, starting with the Nazi rise to power led by Adolf Hitler during 1933 to 1939. Topics dealt with include Aryan ideology, Kristallnacht, antisemitism, and the American response to Nazi Germany. Visitors continue walking to the third floor, where they learn about ghettos and the Final Solution – the Nazis's plan for the genocide of the Jews of Europe – during which the Nazis murdered six million Jews, many in gas chambers. The Permanent Exhibition ends on the second floor with the liberation of Nazi concentration camps by Allied forces; it includes a continuously looped film of Holocaust survivor testimony. First-time visitors spend an average of two to three hours in this self-guided exhibition. Due to certain images and subject matter, it is recommended for visitors 11 years of age and older.

=== Remember the Children: Daniel's Story ===
Remember the Children: Daniel's Story is an exhibition designed to explain the Holocaust to elementary and middle school children. Opened in 1993, it follows true stories about children during the Holocaust. Daniel is named after the son of Isaiah Kuperstein, who was the original curator of the exhibit. He worked together with Ann Lewin and Stan Woodward to create the exhibit. Because of its popularity with families, it is still open to the public today.

=== Stephen Tyrone Johns Memorial ===
In October 2009, the USHMM unveiled a memorial plaque in honor of Special Police Officer Stephen Tyrone Johns. In response to the outpouring of grief and support after the shooting on June 10, 2009, it has also established the Stephen Tyrone Johns Summer Youth Leadership Program. Each year, 50 outstanding young people from the Washington, D.C. area will be invited to the USHMM to learn about the Holocaust in honor of Johns' memory.

=== A Dangerous Lie (2006) ===
A Dangerous Lie: The Protocols of the Elders of Zion was a special exhibition about the 1903 Russian antisemitic canard, The Protocols of the Elders of Zion. The exhibit was curated by Daniel Greene.

The exhibit explained that in the early 20th century and during Hitler's rise to power in Germany, it was widely accepted that the Protocols documented an actual conspiracy by a small cabal of Jews to control the world for nefarious purposes, and that government and media in some countries continue to promote the Protocols as proof that such a Jewish conspiracy to control the world exists. It details the manner in which Henry Ford was responsible for popularizing the fake Protocols in his newspaper, The Dearborn Independent.

== Permanent collection ==
The Museum's holdings included art, books, pamphlets, advertisements, maps, film and video historical footage, audio and video oral testimonies, music and sound recordings, furnishings, architectural fragments, models, machinery, tools, microfilm and microfiche of government documents and other official records, personal effects, personal papers, photographs, photo albums, and textiles. This information can be accessed through online databases or by visiting the USHMM. Researchers from all over the world come to the USHMM Library and Archives and the Benjamin and Vladka Meed Registry of Holocaust Survivors. In March 2024, the museum announced that it acquired the Centropa collection, a collection that contains rare testimonies of Holocaust survivors living in post-war communist countries.

=== Museum gallery ===
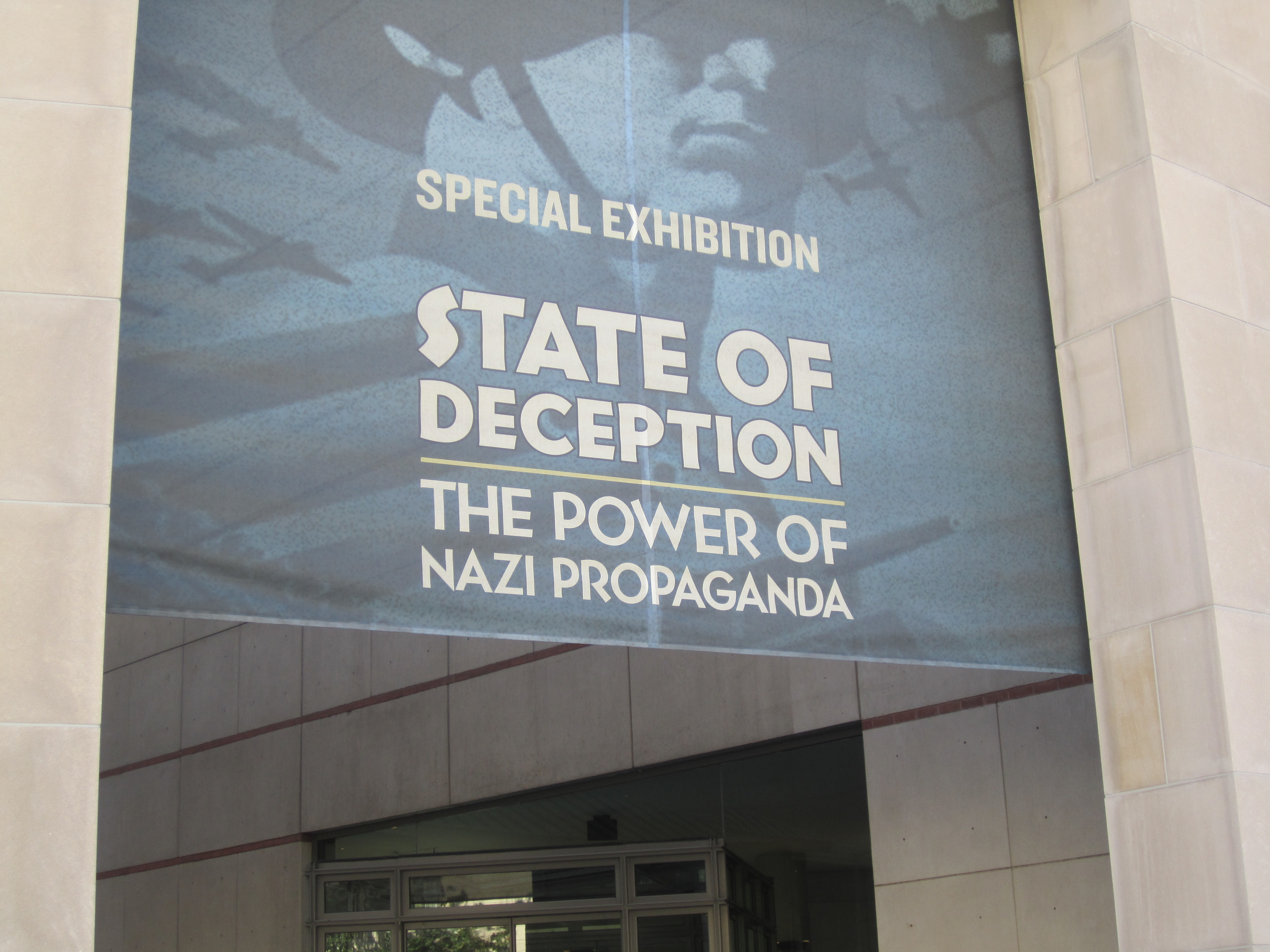
"State of Deception" Nazi propaganda exhibition at the museum in 2011

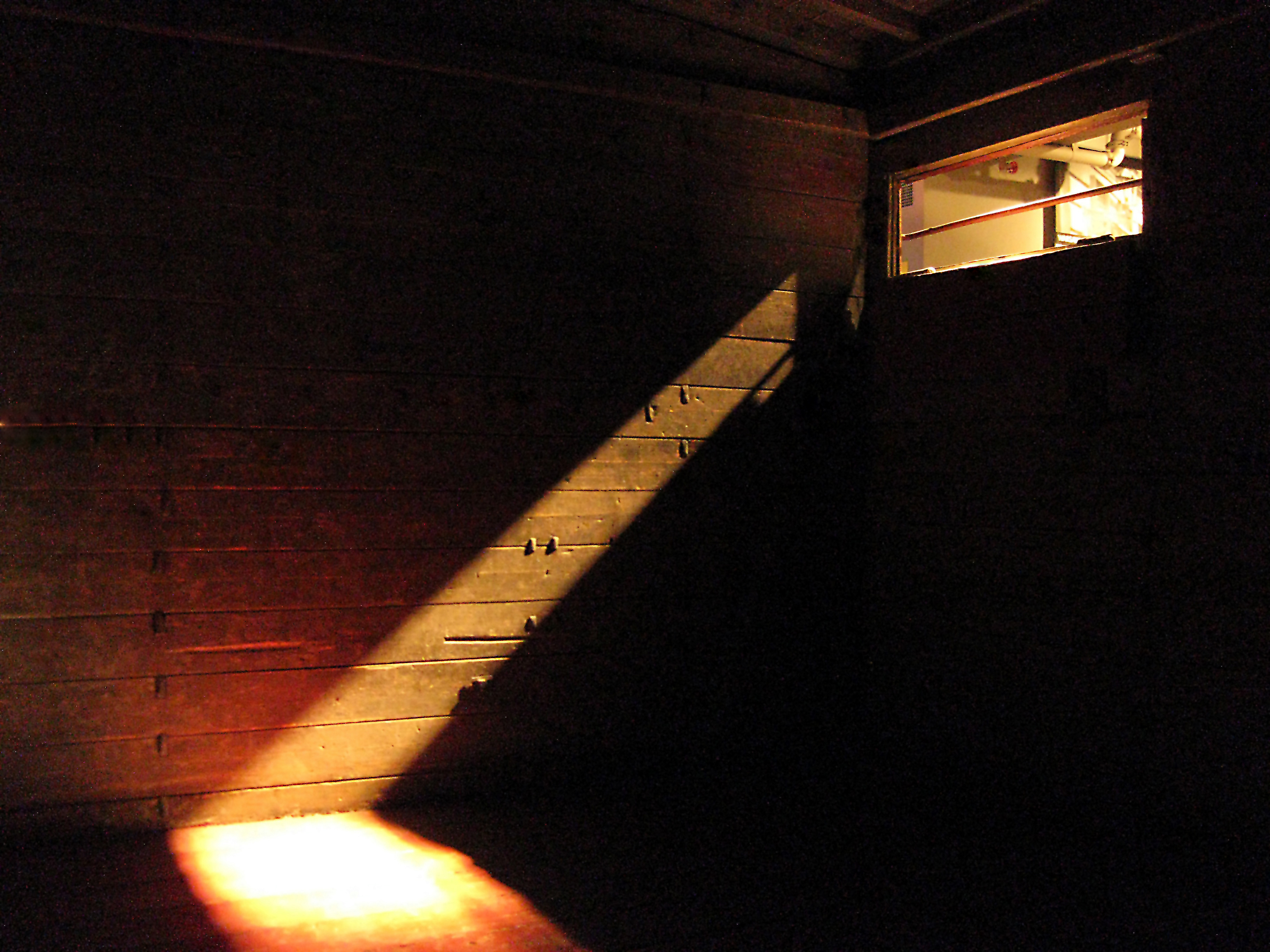
(Interior) An A2 railcar, one of several types used as Holocaust trains by Nazi Germany to transport victims

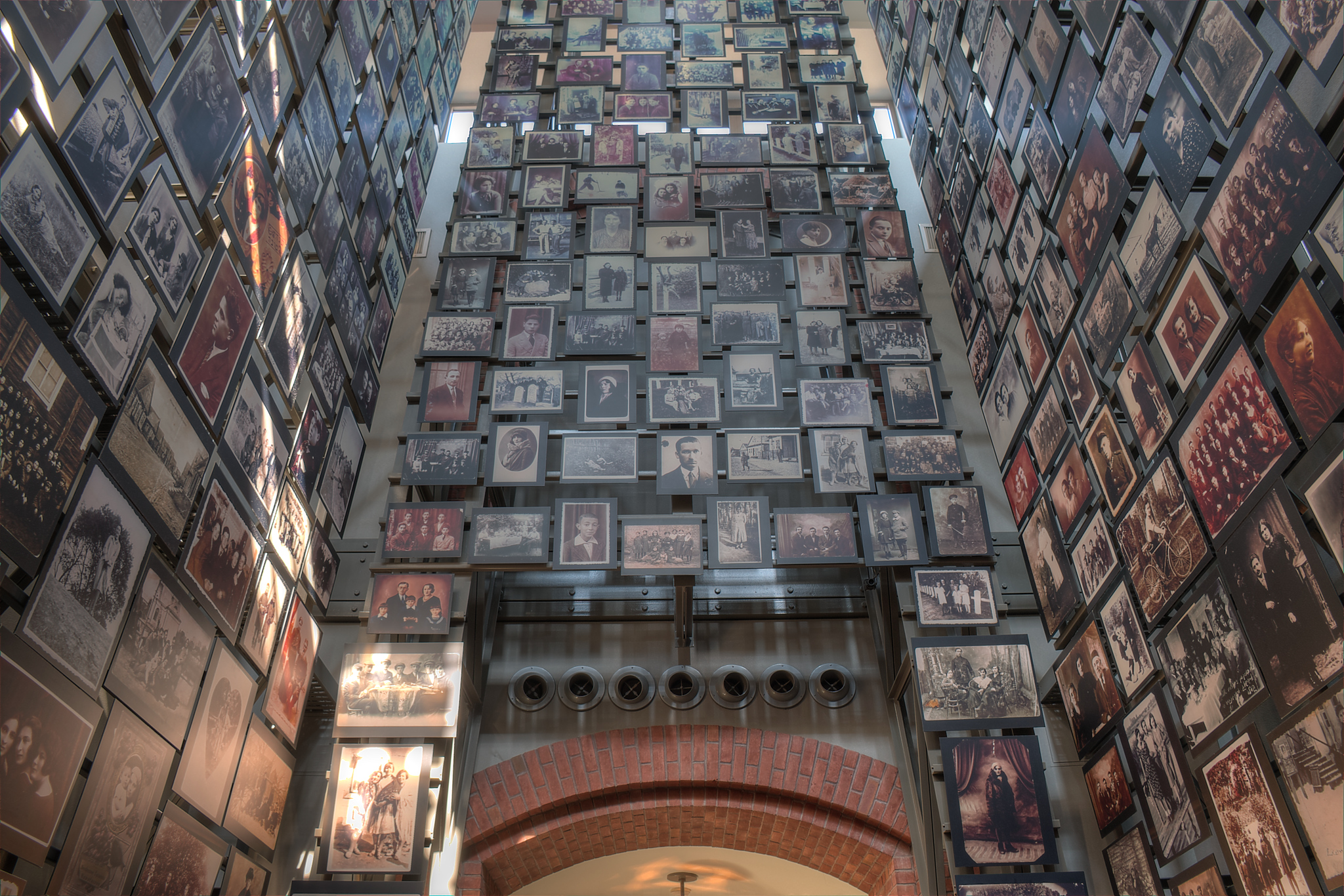
Tower of Faces

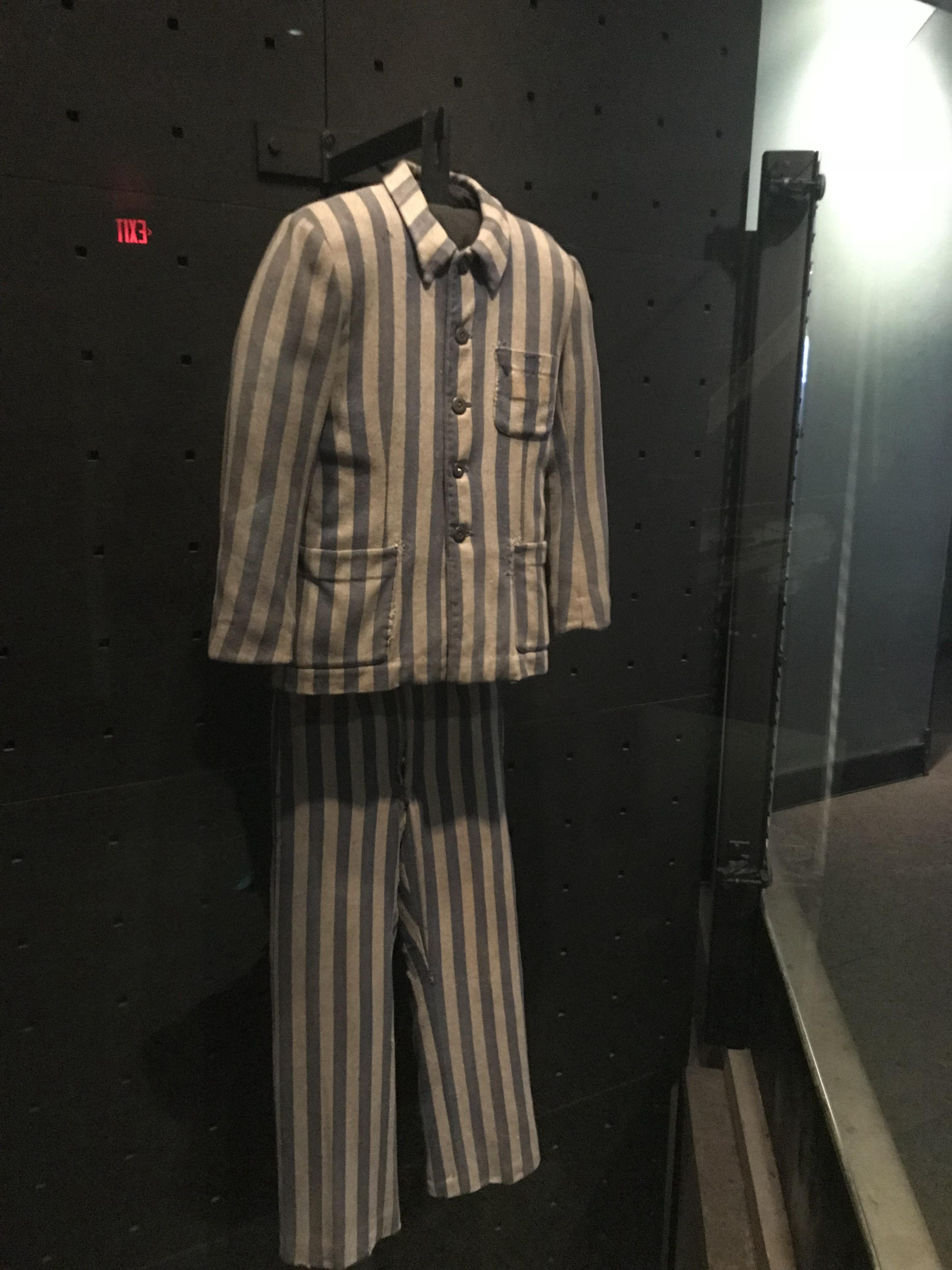
This uniform on display was worn by prisoners in Nazi concentration camps.

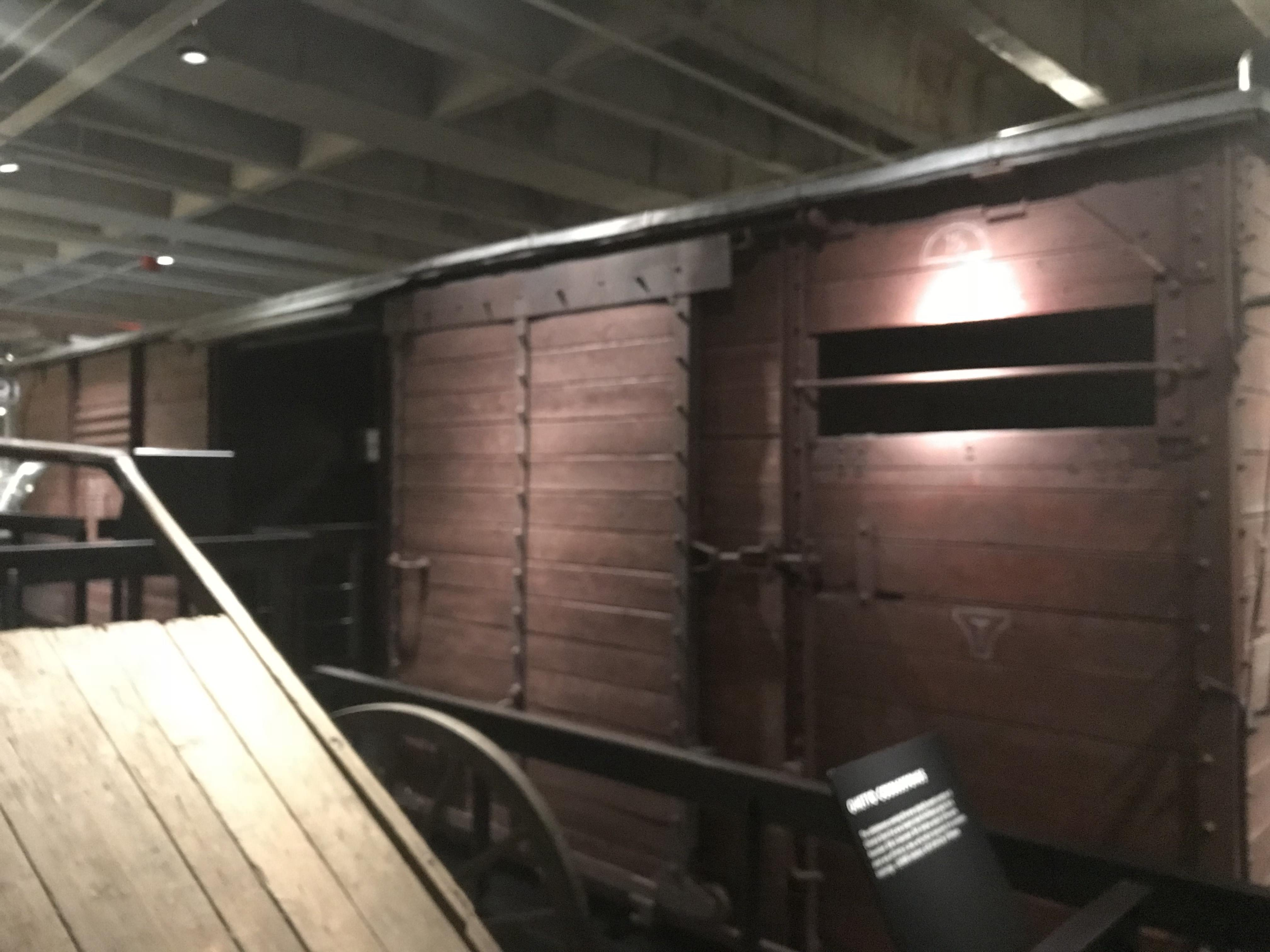
(Exterior) A2 railcar owned by Deutsche Reichsbahn and donated by the Chief Commission for the Prosecution of Crimes against the Polish Nation in 1991

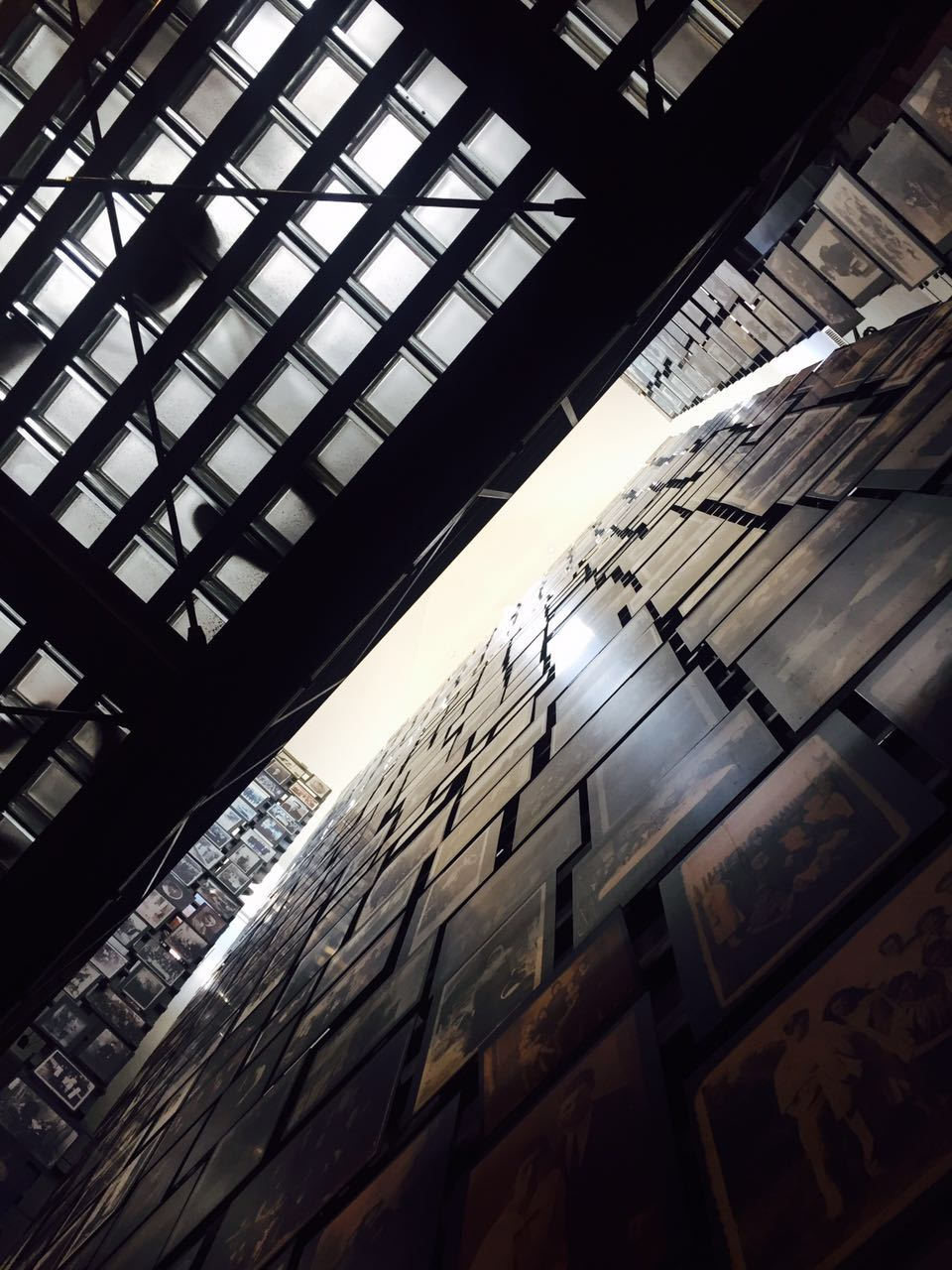
Photo Wall at the Holocaust Memorial Museum

== Architecture ==
Designed by the architect James Ingo Freed of Pei Cobb Freed & Partners, in association with Finegold Alexander & Associates, the USHMM is created to be a "resonator of memory." Born to a Jewish family in Germany, Freed came to the United States at the age of nine in 1939 with his parents, who fled the Nazi regime. The outside of the building disappears into the neoclassical, Georgian, and modern architecture of Washington, D.C. Upon entering, each architectural feature becomes a new element of allusion to the Holocaust. In designing the building, Freed researched post-World War II German architecture and visited Holocaust sites throughout Europe. The Museum building and the exhibitions within are intended to evoke deception, fear, and solemnity, in contrast to the comfort and grandiosity usually associated with Washington, D.C., public buildings.

Other partners in the construction of the USHMM included Weiskopf & Pickworth, Cosentini Associates LLP, Jules Fisher, and Paul Marantz, all from New York City. The structural engineering firm was Severud Associates. The Museum's Meyerhoff Theatre and Rubenstein Auditorium were constructed by Jules Fisher Associates of New York City. The Permanent Exhibition was designed by Ralph Appelbaum Associates.

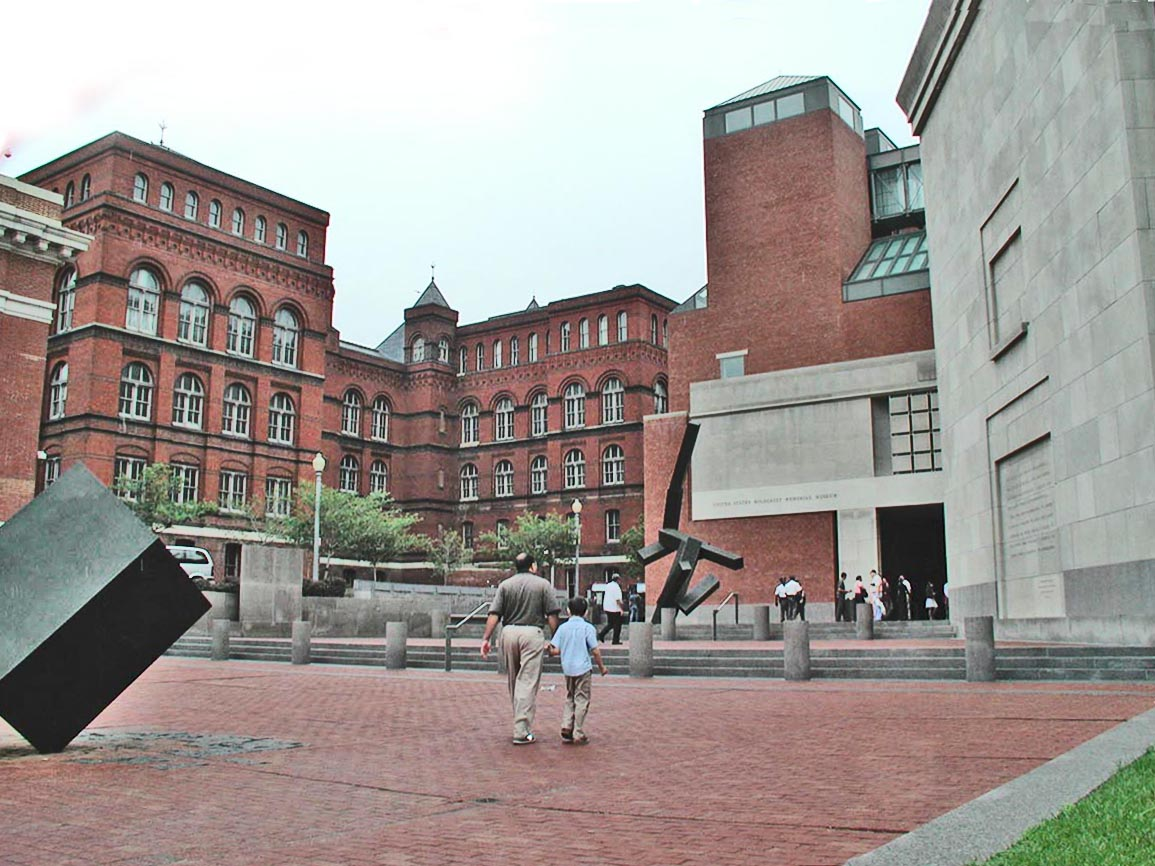
Raoul Wallenberg Place Entrance with Dwight Eisenhower Plaza in the Foreground

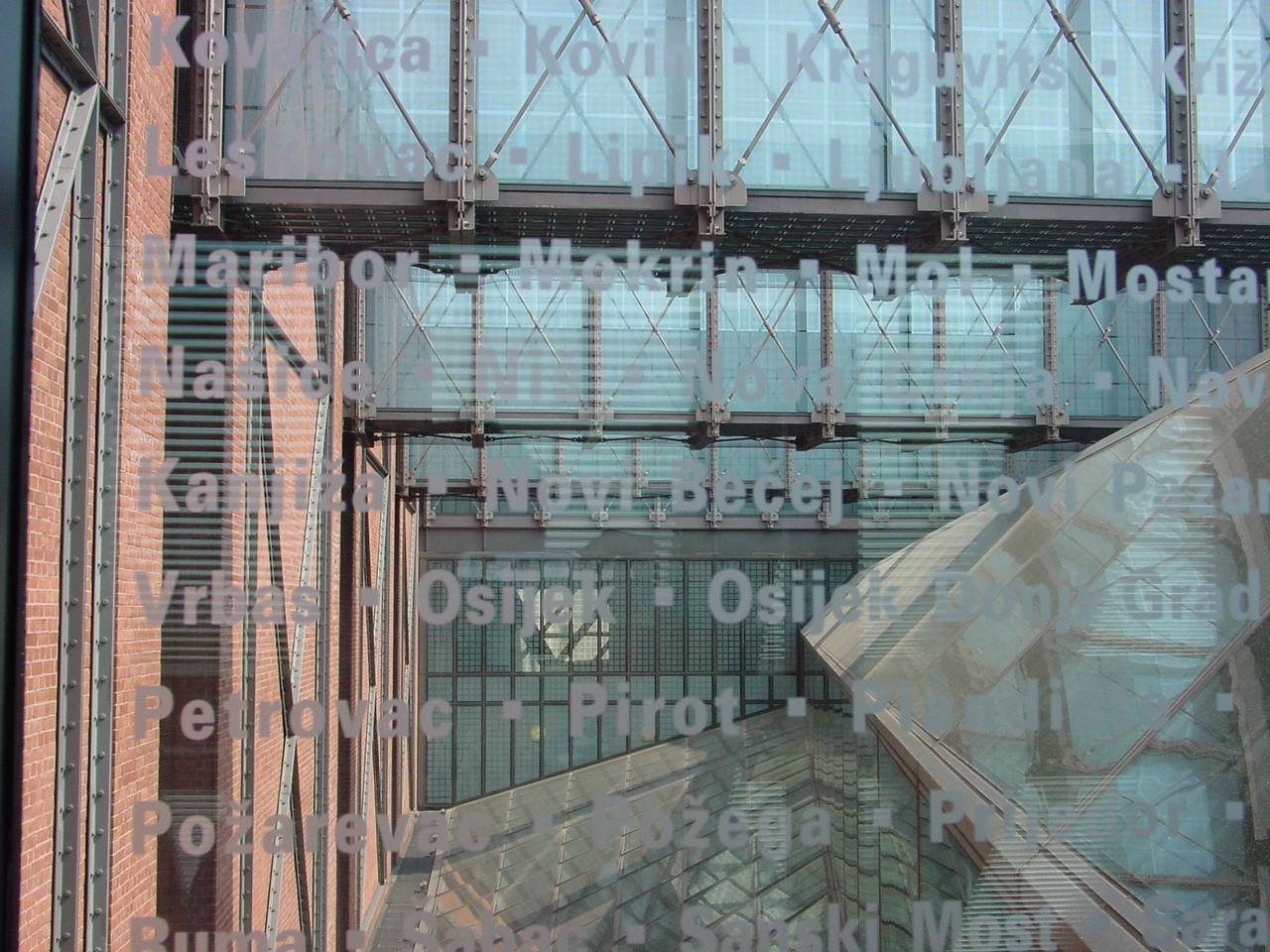
Bridges in the USHMM. Blue glass etched with names and places lost during the Holocaust.

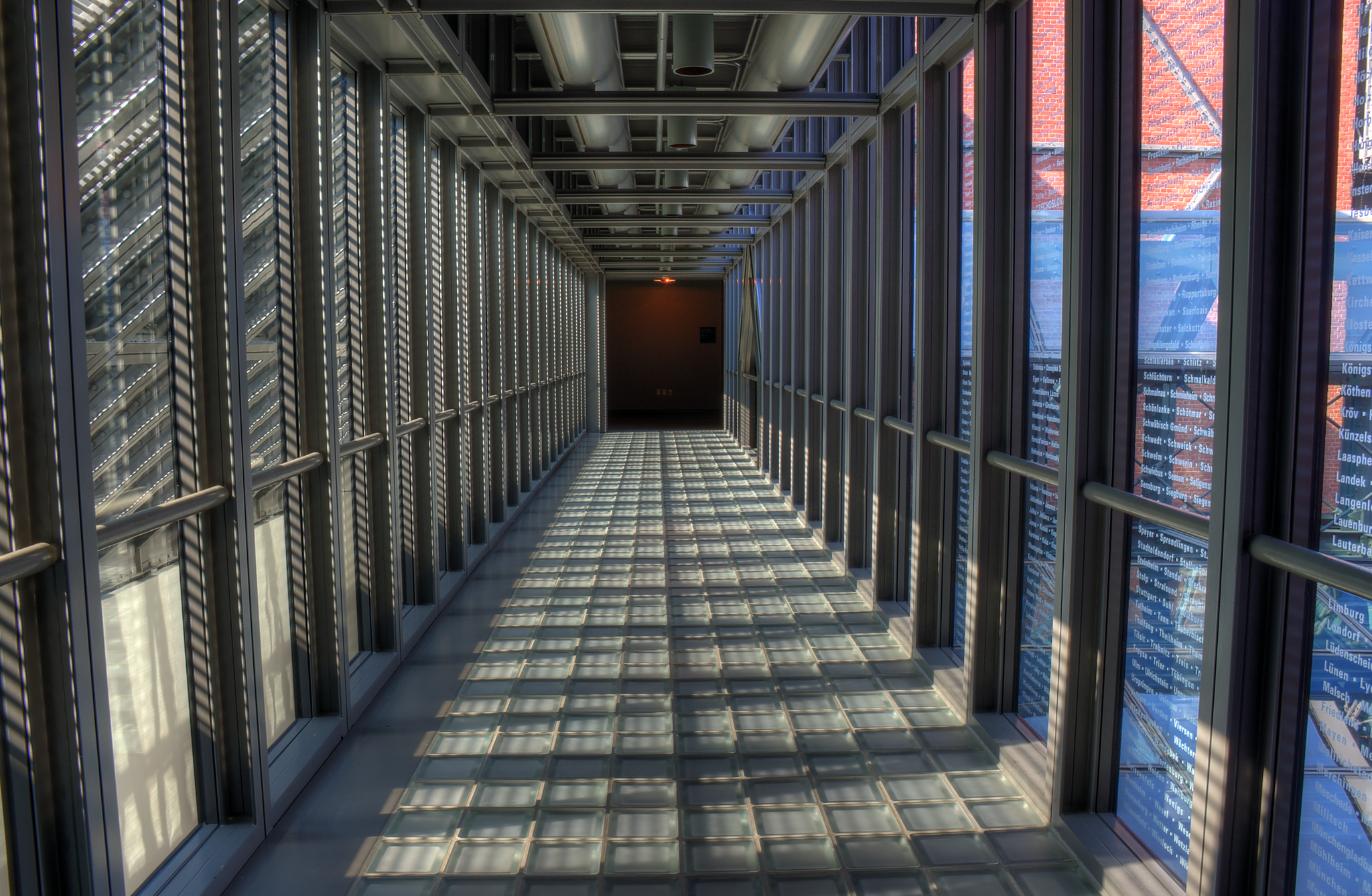
Glass bridge over the Hall of Witness

== Financial administration ==
The USHMM is primarily funded by charitable contributions and government grants. For the 2021–2022 fiscal year, the museum reported a total revenue of $184.7 million and total expenses of $143.1 million. Net assets totaled $696.9 million as of September 30, 2022.

== Center for Advanced Holocaust Studies ==
In 1998, the museum established the Center for Advanced Holocaust Studies (CAHS). Working with the Academic Committee of the United States Holocaust Memorial Council, the CAHS supports research projects and publications about the Holocaust (including a partnership with Oxford University Press to publish the scholarly journal Holocaust and Genocide Studies), helps make accessible collections of Holocaust-related archival material, supports fellowship opportunities for pre- and post- doctoral researchers, and hosts seminars, summer research workshops for academics, conferences, lectures, and symposia. The CAHS's Visiting Scholars Program and other events have made the USHMM one of the world's biggest institutions for Holocaust scholarship.

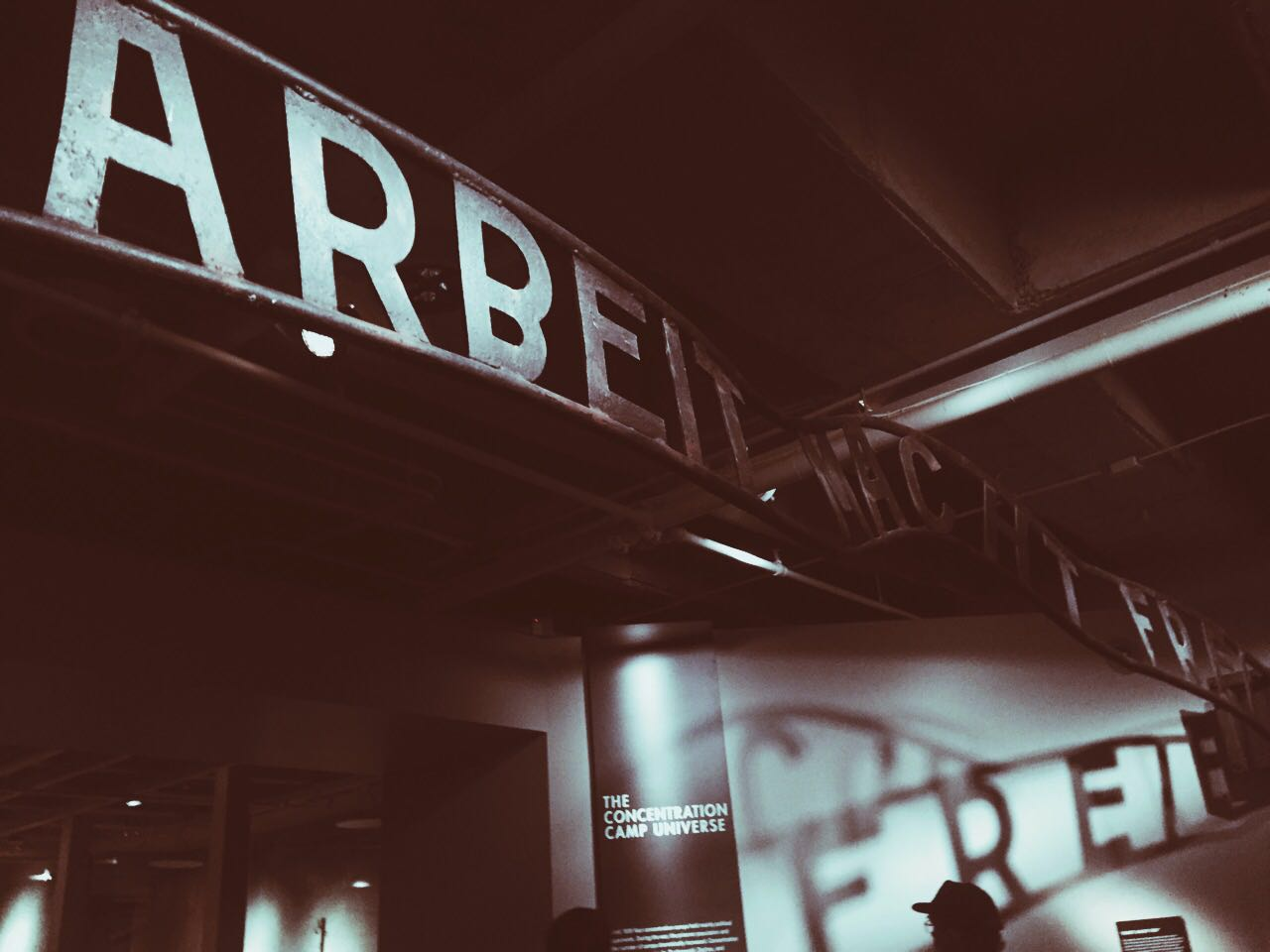
The slogan "Arbeit Macht Frei" displayed at the Holocaust Memorial Museum in Washington, D.C.

== Committee on Conscience ==
The Museum contains the offices of the Committee on Conscience (CoC), a joint United States government and privately funded think tank, which by presidential mandate engages in global human rights research. Using the Convention on the Prevention and Punishment of the Crime of Genocide, approved by the United Nations in 1948 and ratified by the United States in 1988, the CoC has established itself as a leading non-partisan commenter on the Darfur genocide, as well as the war-torn region of Chechnya in Russia, a zone that the CoC believes could produce genocidal atrocities. The CoC does not have policy-making powers and serves solely as an advisory institution to the American and other governments.

== National Days of Remembrance of the Victims of the Holocaust ==
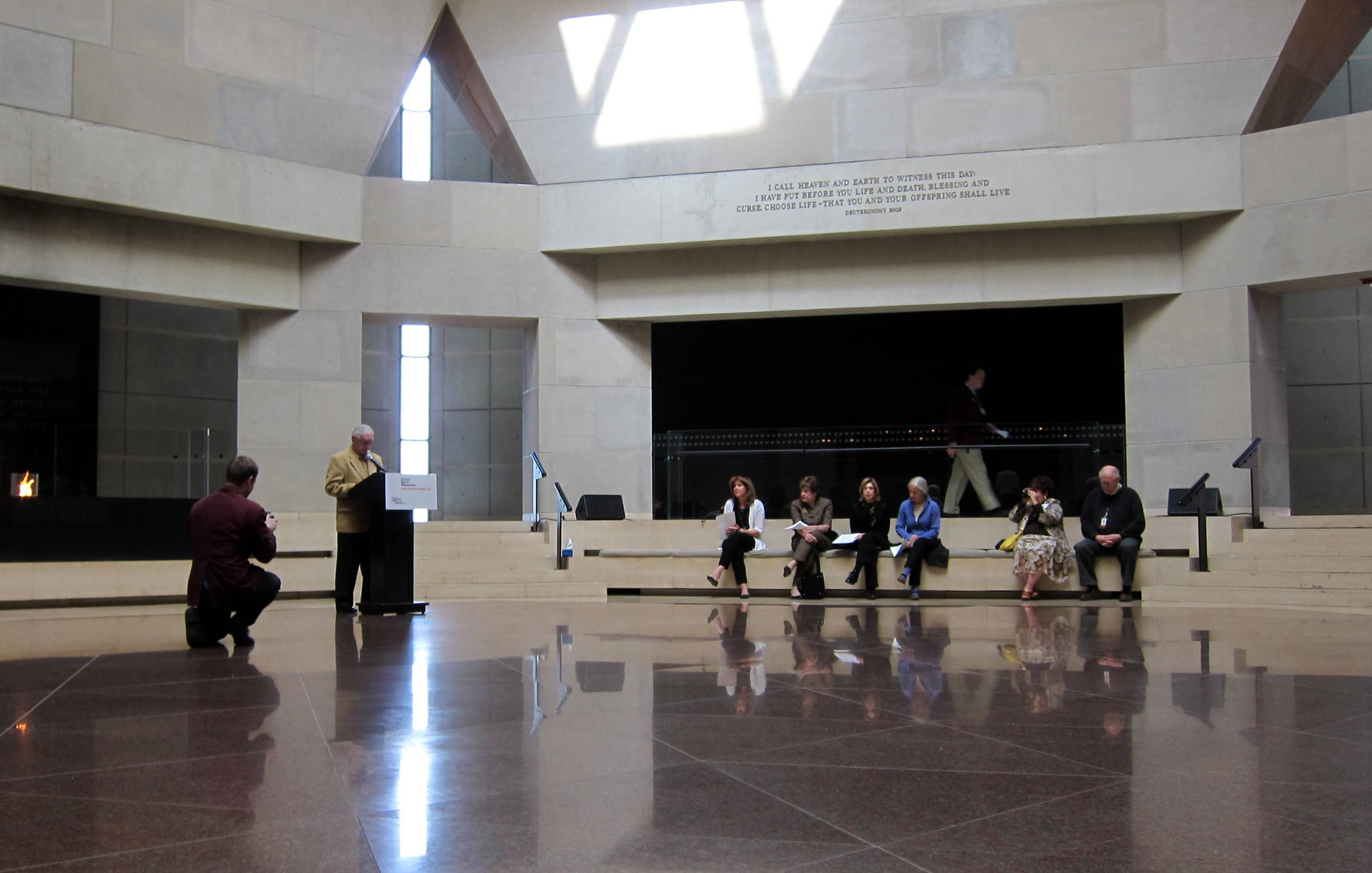
While standing inside The Hall of Remembrance, located within the United States Holocaust Memorial Museum, a volunteer reads the names of Holocaust victims during the Days of Remembrance of the Victims of the Holocaust.

In addition to coordinating the National Civic Commemoration, events are held during the week of the Days of Remembrance of the Victims of the Holocaust on a theme designated each year by the USHMM.

== National Institute for Holocaust Education ==
The USHMM conducted several programs devoted to improving Holocaust education. The Arthur and Rochelle Belfer Conference for Teachers, conducted in Washington, D.C., attracted around 200 middle school and secondary teachers from around the United States each year. The Education Division offered workshops around the United States for teachers to learn about the Holocaust, to participate in the Museum Teacher Fellowship Program (MTFP), and to join a national corps of educators who served as leaders in Holocaust education in their schools, communities, and professional organizations. Some MTFP participants also participated in the Regional Education Corps, an initiative to implement Holocaust education on a national level.

Since 1999, the USHMM also provided public service professionals, including law enforcement officers, military personnel, civil servants, and federal judges with ethics lessons based in Holocaust history. In partnership with the Anti-Defamation League, more than 21,000 law enforcement officers from worldwide and local law enforcement agencies such as the FBI and local police departments have been trained to act in a professional and democratic manner.

== Encyclopedia of Camps and Ghettos ==
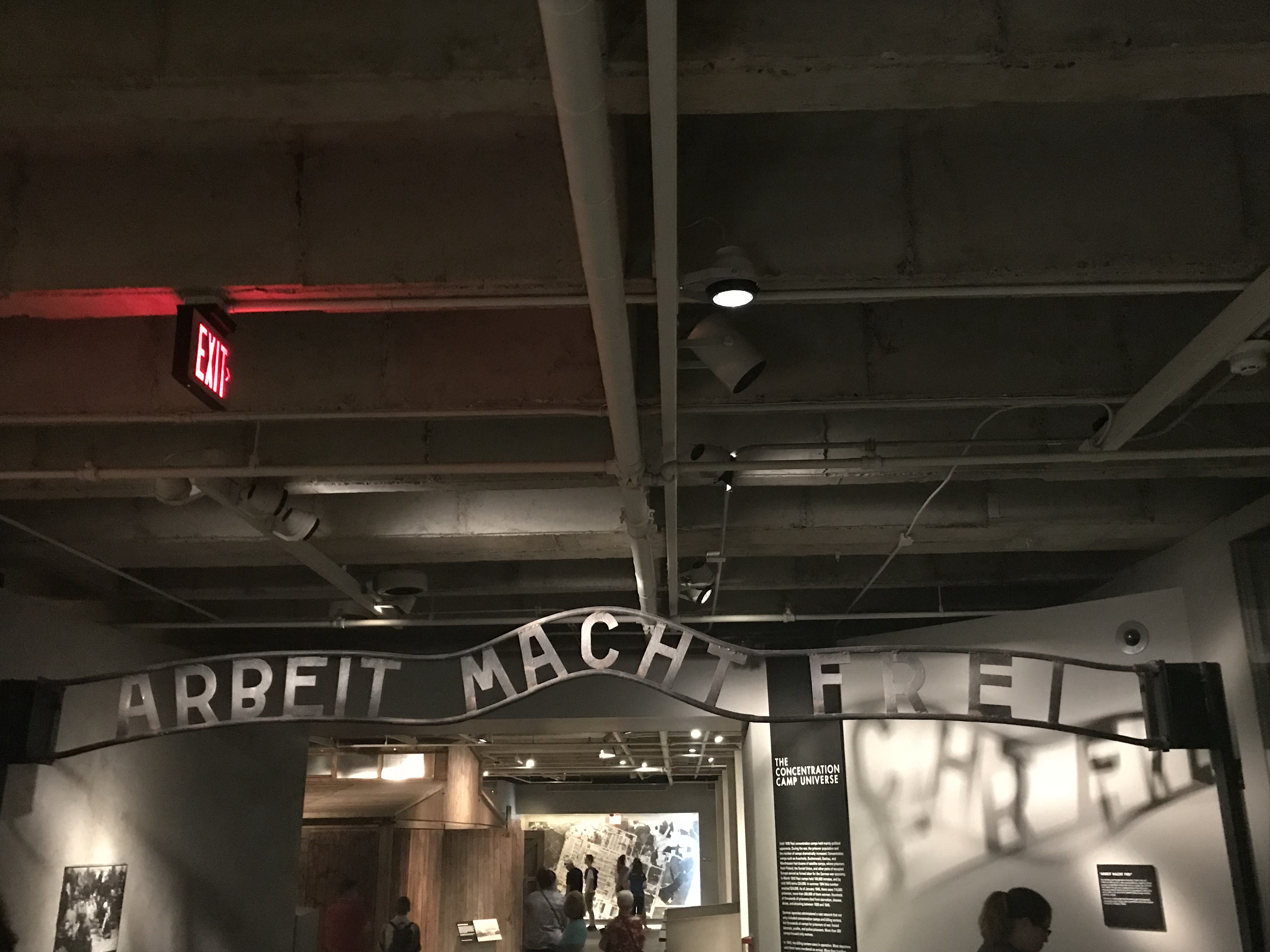
Replica of Auschwitz sign "Arbeit Macht Frei" which means "work will set you free"

The Encyclopedia of Camps and Ghettos, 1933–1945 is a seven-part encyclopedia series that explores the history of the concentration camps and the ghettos in German-occupied Europe during the Nazi era. The series is produced by the USHMM and published by the Indiana University Press. The work on the series began in 2000 by the researchers at the USHMM's Center for Advanced Holocaust Studies. Its general editor and project directory is the American historian Geoffrey P. Megargee. As of 2017, two volumes have been issued, with the third being planned for 2018.

Volume I covers the early camps that the SA and SS set up in the first year of the Nazi regime, and the camps later run by the SS Economic Administration Main Office and their numerous sub-camps. The volume contains 1,100 entries written by 150 contributors. The bulk of the volume is dedicated to cataloguing the camps, including locations, duration of operation, purpose, perpetrators and victims. Volume II is dedicated to the ghettos in German-occupied Eastern Europe and was published in 2012. In some cases, archival material now housed at the Center has allowed the post-mortem reconstruction of considerable achievements, such as the work of Lodz ghetto artist Melania Fogelbaum and others, which would otherwise have been lost to Nazi extermination and total war terror.

== Outreach ==
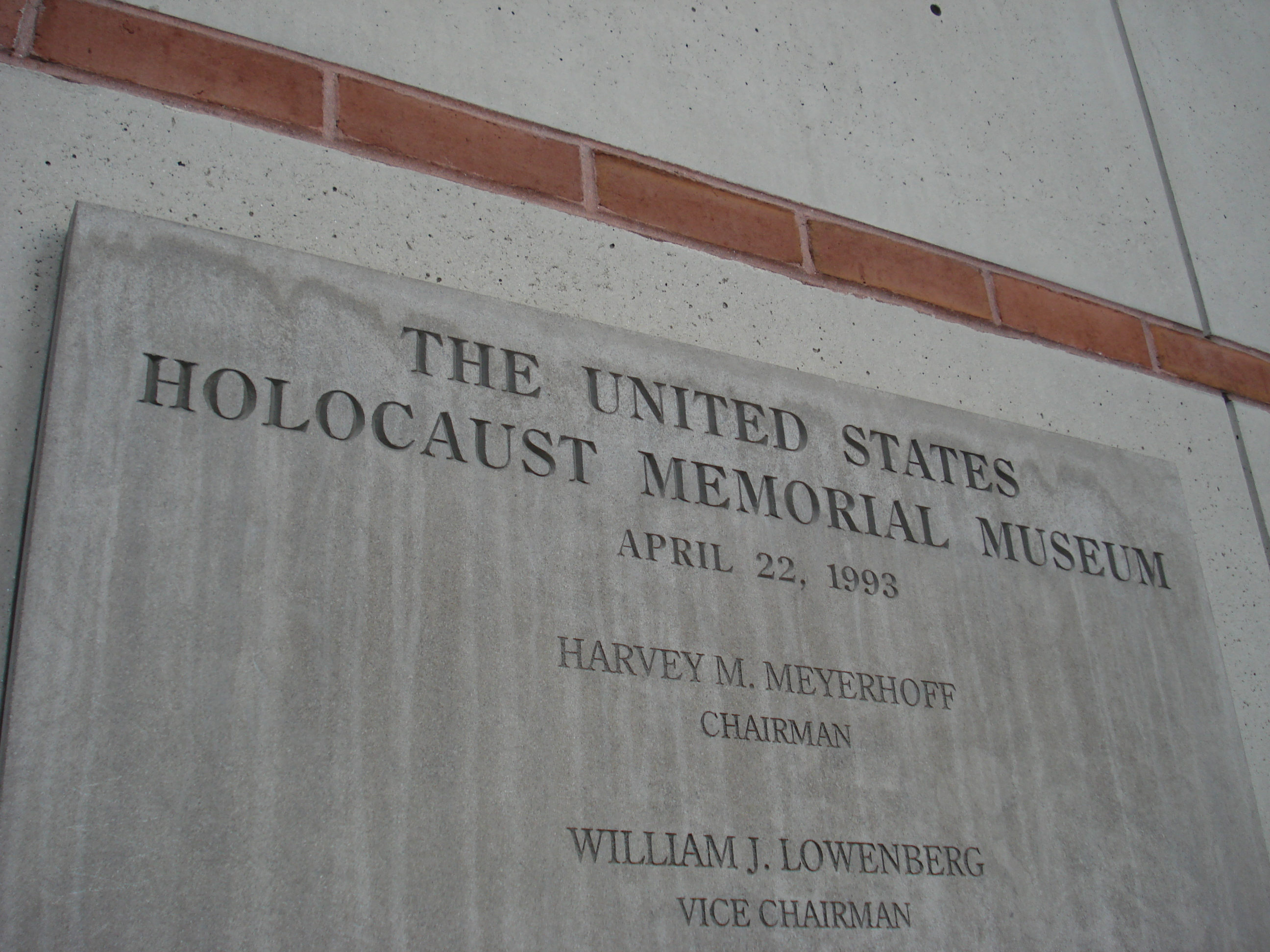
A dedication plaque outside the Museum

Through its online exhibitions, the Museum published the Holocaust Encyclopedia—an online, multilingual encyclopedia detailing the events surrounding the Holocaust. It is published in all six of the official languages of the United Nations—Arabic, Mandarin, English, French, Russian, and Spanish, as well as in Greek, Portuguese, Persian, Turkish, and Urdu. It contains thousands of entries and includes copies of the identification card profiles that visitors receive at the Permanent Exhibition.

The Genocide Prevention Mapping Initiative is a collaboration between the USHMM and Google Earth. It seeks to collect, share, and visually present to the world critical information on emerging crises that may lead to genocide or related crimes against humanity.

== Elie Wiesel Award ==
The United States Holocaust Memorial Museum Award, established in 2011, "recognizes internationally prominent individuals whose actions have advanced the Museum’s vision of a world where people confront hatred, prevent genocide, and promote human dignity." It has been renamed the Elie Wiesel Award in honor of its first recipient. Winners include:

- 2011: Elie Wiesel
- 2012: Aung San Suu Kyi (rescinded in 2018 due to the ongoing Rohingya genocide)
- 2013: Władysław Bartoszewski and the Veterans of World War II
- 2014: Lieutenant-General Roméo Dallaire
- 2015: Judge Thomas Buergenthal and Benjamin Ferencz
- 2016: US Representative John Lewis
- 2017: German Chancellor Angela Merkel
- 2018: All Holocaust survivors
- 2019: Serge and Beate Klarsfeld and Syria Civil Defense
- 2020: Maziar Bahari
- 2021: Ambassador Stuart Eizenstat and DOJ Office of Special Investigations
- 2022: The Ritchie Boys
- 2023: Museum Partners

== Governance ==
The museum is overseen by the United States Holocaust Memorial Council, which includes 55 private citizens appointed by the President of the United States, five members of the United States Senate, and five members of the House of Representatives, and three ex-officio members from the Departments of State, Education, and the Interior.

=== Council composition ===
The council has 68 members, including 55 appointed at the pleasure of the President of the United States.

Since the council was established by an act of the 96th United States Congress in 1980, it has been led by the following officers.

- Chairman Elie Wiesel; 1980–1986
- Chairman Harvey M. Meyerhoff, appointed by President Ronald Reagan; 1987–1993
- Chairman Miles Lerman and Vice Chairman Ruth B. Mandel, appointed by President Bill Clinton; 1993–2000
- Chairman Rabbi Irving Greenberg, appointed by President Clinton; 2000–2002
- Chairman Fred S. Zeidman, appointed by President George W. Bush in 2002; and Vice Chairman Joel M. Geiderman, appointed by President Bush, 2005–2010
- Chairman Tom A. Bernstein; 2010–2017
- Chairman Howard M. Lorber, appointed by President Donald J. Trump; 2017–2022
- Chairman Stuart Eizenstat, 2022–present

The council has appointed the following as directors of the museum:

- Jeshajahu Weinberg, 1987–94
- Walter Reich, 1995–98
- Sara J. Bloomfield, 1999–present

=== Council History ===
==== Quran oath controversy of the 110th United States Congress ====
In 2006, USHMC member Dennis Prager criticized Keith Ellison, the first Muslim elected to Congress, for announcing that he would use the Quran for the reenactment of his swearing in ceremony. In response, former New York City Mayor Ed Koch called for Prager to end his service on the USHMC.

The Council's executive committee subsequently issued a resolution that the Council "disassociates itself from Mr. Prager's statements as being antithetical to the mission of the [Holocaust] Museum as an institution promoting tolerance and respect for all peoples regardless of their race, religion or ethnicity".

==== Second Trump Administration ====
In April 2025, President Donald Trump fired a number of council members appointed during the previous Biden administration, including former Second Gentleman Doug Emhoff. Kevin Abel, appointed to the council in 2023, characterized the firings as part of Trump's "campaign of retribution". In May 2025, the editorial board of the Washington Jewish Week described the firings as "A political purge at the USHMC".

Trump subsequently appointed a number of members to the council, including Betty Schwartz, Fred Marcus, Rabbi Pinchos Lipschutz, Lee Lipton, Sid Rosenberg, Ariel Abergel, Barbara Feingold, Alex Witkoff, and Robert Garson. Garson previously served as Trump's attorney in his 2023 lawsuit against journalist Bob Woodward, and Witkoff is the son of Middle East envoy Steve Witkoff.

== Controversy ==
As a result of lobbying by Turkey, Israel, and American Jewish organizations, there is no mention of the Armenian genocide in the permanent exhibition. Individuals involved in the museum including Stuart Eizenstat and Monroe H. Freedman reported that Turkish diplomats told them that the safety of Jews in Turkey was not guaranteed if the museum included content on the Armenian genocide.

After U.S. Representative Alexandria Ocasio-Cortez called the detention camps along the Mexico–United States border "concentration camps", and used the phrase "never again" in June 2019, the USHMM published a statement declaring that it "unequivocally rejects efforts to create analogies between the Holocaust and other events, whether historical or contemporary." A group of historians and scholars called this "a radical position that is far removed from mainstream scholarship on the Holocaust and genocide", which "made learning from the past almost impossible."

In 2025, the museum removed materials on topics such as German society before the Nazi regime, African American Soldiers during World War II, Afro-Germans during the Holocaust, and connections between racism in the United States and Nazi Germany. Former staff stated that the museum preemptively removed content to avoid negative attention from the Trump administration.

The USHMM received sharp criticism from Norman Finkelstein, who asked why the victims of the Holocaust have a national museum but not the victims of slavery in the U.S. or the Native American genocide. He also argued that the non-Jewish victims of the Holocaust—especially the victims of the Romani Holocaust, or Porajmos—got only token recognition in the museum. In his 2000 book The Holocaust Industry, Finkelstein argued that the museum's leadership is committed to political support of the Israeli state. In 2026, Holocaust historian Raz Segal and international law scholar Luigi Daniele wrote that while the museum had immediately condemned the 7 October attacks, it had remained silent on the Gaza war and did not mention the Nakba when discussing the foundation of Israel.

== See also ==
- Auschwitz-Birkenau State Museum
- Austrian Holocaust Memorial Service
- Culture of Remembrance
- Ghetto Fighters' House
- Holocaust Memorial Center
- Illinois Holocaust Museum and Education Center
- List of Holocaust memorials and museums
- List of museums in Washington, D.C.
- Memorial to the Murdered Jews of Europe
- Montreal Holocaust Memorial Centre
- POLIN Museum of the History of Polish Jews
- Stephen Roth Institute
- Task Force for International Cooperation on Holocaust Education, Remembrance, and Research
- The Holocaust and the United Nations Outreach Programme
- Raoul Wallenberg
- Simon Wiesenthal Center
- Yad Vashem
- Yom HaShoah
