= Scott Spence =

Scott Spence is the artistic director of the Beck Center in Lakewood, Ohio. Artistic Director since 1992 (Assoc. Artistic Director 1990–1992) Graduate Degree (Master of Fine Arts) in Directing from Western Illinois Univ. (1986), BA in Theatre from Univ. of Nebraska-Lincoln (1984). Class of 1980 Lincoln Southeast High School (Lincoln Nebraska).

Produced over 250 musicals and plays since 1990 and Directed over 100 in that time. Notable productions include "Floyd Collins" (1st non Tina Landau-directed Production), "Reefer Madness" (1st production outside of LA/NYC), "The Fix" (First production outside London {Donmar Warehouse} and Wash. DC {Signature Theatre} ). Recipient of the Northern Ohio Live Award of Achievement in Theatre for 2006.

Other musicals include "Urinetown", "Parade", "Kiss of the Spider Woman", "Tommy", Miss Saigon", "The Full Monty", "Eating Raoul", "A Man of No Importance", and one of the first professional American productions of "Moby Dick, the Musical" revised by Russell Ochocki. He also recently directed productions of “Matilda” and “American Idiot". Acting roles at Beck include "Passion" (Dr. Tambouri) Victoria Bussert, Director, "Laughter on the 23rd Floor" (Ira) Carol Dunne, Director, and "Big River" (Young Fool) William Roudebush, Director. Other NE Ohio shows directed include "Noises Off" (Berea Summer Theatre and Weathervane Playhouse) and "Das Barbecu" (Lyric Opera Cleveland) w/ Composer Scott Warrender, Musical Director.
