= Robert L. Niehoff =

Robert Niehoff

24th President of John Carroll University
- In office August 22, 2005 – July 1, 2017
- Preceded by: Edward J. Glynn
- Succeeded by: Michael D. Johnson

Personal details
- Education: Gonzaga University (BA, PhD); Jesuit School of Theology (MDiv, MTS); University of Washington (MBA)

Rev. Robert L. Niehoff, S.J. (born August 14, 1953) is the President Emeritus of John Carroll University in University Heights, Ohio.

Niehoff was appointed as the 24th president of John Carroll University on April 7, 2005, and assumed the duties of presidency on August 22, 2005. Prior to his service at John Carroll, he was the Associate Provost and Vice President for Planning and Budget of the University of San Francisco.

Niehoff joined the Society of Jesus in 1972 and was ordained in 1982. He has a B.A. degree in philosophy, two master's degrees in theology, an MBA at the University of Washington, and a Ph.D. at Gonzaga University. Working on his business background, he has served as the Treasurer of the Jesuit School of Theology at Berkeley; Associate Treasurer of the Oregon Province of the Society of Jesus; Financial Officer of the Roman Catholic Archdiocese of Nassau, in the Bahamas; and Financial Analyst and Assistant to the Vice President for Student Life at Gonzaga University.

On July 1, 2017, following the longest term as president in University history, Niehoff became John Carroll's first President Emeritus.

Academic offices
Preceded by Edward J. Glynn	President of John Carroll University; 2005–2017	Succeeded by Michael D. Johnson
