= Sarah Willis (author) =

American novelist and short story writer

Sarah Willis is an American novelist and short story writer. She lives in Cleveland Heights, Ohio. Her father, Kirk Willis, was an actor and director at the Cleveland Play House. Theater and the arts have informed much of Willis’ work, especially her second novel, The Rehearsal, which is about a theater troupe preparing a performance of Of Mice and Men. Her work is often set in either Cleveland, Ohio, or Chautauqua, New York.

== Career ==
Her first novel, Some Things That Stay was listed as a New York Times Notable Book of the Year, won the Stephen Crane Award for First Fiction 2000, and was awarded The Cleveland Arts Prize in Literature 2000. Some Things That Stay was made into a movie which opened in Canada in October 2004.

She has published short fiction in Book Magazine, Confrontation, Crescent Review, (nominated for a Pushcart Prize), Vincent Brothers Review, Rockford Review, Whiskey Island Review, Riverwind, No Roses Review, Artful Dodge, The Missouri Review, and the anthology, Our Mothers Our Selves. She has published personal essays in The Plain Dealer in their Sunday magazine.

She has taught creative writing workshops at John Carroll University and Hiram College and at the Maui Writer's Conference.

Sarah Willis founded and runs the Cleveland East Side Writers.

== Novels ==
- Some Things That Stay (Farrar, Straus & Giroux, 2000)
- The Rehearsal (Farrar, Straus & Giroux 2001)
- A Good Distance (Berkley, 2004)
- The Sound of Us (Berkley 2005)
