= Chantal Strasser =

Swiss swimmer (born 1978)

Personal information
- Full name: Chantal Strasser
- Nationality: Switzerland
- Born: 21 March 1978 (age 48) Zürich
- Height: 1.80 m (5 ft 11 in)
- Weight: 64 kg (141 lb)

Sport
- Sport: Swimming
- Strokes: Freestyle
- Club: Schwimmclub Uster
Medal record
Women's swimming
European Championships (LC)
Silver medal – second place	2000 Helsinki	800 m freestyle
European Championships (SC)
Gold medal – first place	2000 Valencia	800 m freestyle
Bronze medal – third place	1996 Rostock	400 m freestyle

Chantal Strasser (born 21 March 1978 in Zürich) is a retired female freestyle swimmer from Switzerland. She competed in three consecutive Summer Olympics for her native country, starting in 1996 in Atlanta, Georgia.
