= Tennessee Volunteers women's swimming and diving =

Tennessee Volunteers
- Founded: 1971
- Athletic director: Danny White
- Head coach: Matt Kredich (19th season)
- Conference: Southeastern Conference
- Location: Knoxville, Tennessee, US
- Home pool: Allan Jones Intercollegiate Aquatic Center (capacity 3,800)
- Nickname: Lady Volunteers
- Colors: Orange, white, and smokey gray

NCAA Championship appearances
- 1978*, 1981*, 1982, 1983, 1984, 1985, 1986, 1987, 1988, 1989, 1990, 1991, 1992, 1993, 1994, 1995, 1996, 1997, 1998, 1999, 2000, 2001, 2002, 2003, 2004, 2005, 2006, 2007, 2008, 2009, 2010, 2011, 2012, 2013, 2014, 2015, 2016, 2017, 2018, 2019, 2021, 2022, 2023, 2024; Asterisk = AIAW

Conference Champions
- 2020, 2022

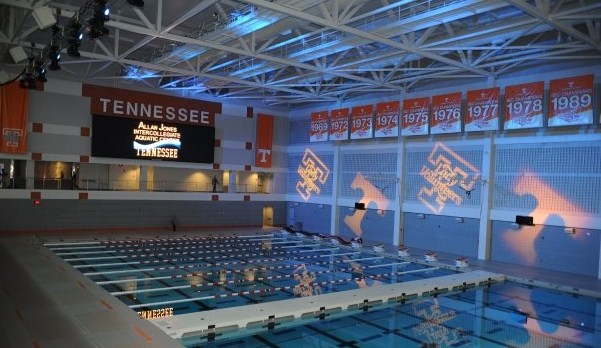
Jones Aquatic Center

The Tennessee Volunteers women's Swimming and Diving program represents the University of Tennessee located in Knoxville, Tennessee. The Volunteers are currently coached by Matt Kredich. The Lady Vols host their swim home meets in Allan Jones Intercollegiate Aquatic Center which was built in 2008. The Lady Vols compete in the SEC where they have won 2 SEC team titles (2020 and 2022), 84 individual, relay, and diving titles. Additionally, the program is one of only 3 that have scored in all 41 NCAA meets, and it has produced 8 NCAA individual and relay titles, 16 Olympians, and 3 Olympic medalists.

Along with all other UT women's sports teams, it used the nickname "Lady Volunteers" (or the short form "Lady Vols") until the 2015–16 school year, when the school dropped the "Lady" prefix from the nicknames of all women's teams except in basketball. In 2017 the university announced the return of the “Lady Volunteer” name.

== History ==
While the men's program has more historical success than the women's side, the Lady Vols lead the SEC in NCAA Championship appearances and are one of only three programs nationally (Stanford & Arizona) to score and appear in all 41 NCAA Championships since the event's inception in 1982. All time, the Lady Vols have finished in the Top 10 at the NCAAs 11 times, including a current steak of 4 straight, and in the top 5 twice.

=== Dan Colella Era ===
Lady Vols were led by Pete Raykovich from 1990 to 1993. His three teams finished 17th, 18th, and 19th respectively at the NCAAs. Dan Colella, an assistant on the team, succeeded Raykovich for the next 12 seasons before he left following the 2006 season to take the head coaching job for both of Duke's swimming teams. At UT, ten of Colella's twelve teams finished in the top 25 of the NCAA Championships; however, they finished in the top 10 just once.

=== Matt Kredich Era ===
Under current head coach Matt Kredich, the Lady Vols have become a national power, including 9 top 10 finishes at the NCAAs, a program-high 3rd place mark at the 2013 NCAA Championships, and winning SEC team titles in 2020 and 2022. When the 2020 NCAA Championships were cancelled, the Lady Vols were ranked #2 in the nation. Under Kredich's direction, the Lady Vols have broken 18-of-19 Tennessee swimming records, and had 19 different athletes garner 120 All-America awards. The Lady Vols finished in the top-15 at the NCAA Championships for a team record 11 consecutive seasons (2006–2016), and finished in the top-10 from 2018 to 2023.

== Head coaches ==
#	Coach	Years	Seasons	Record			SEC; Titles	NCAA; Top 10	NCAA; Top 5
#	Coach	Years	Seasons	Won	Lost	%	SEC; Titles	NCAA; Top 10	NCAA; Top 5
1	Frank Bryant	1971-1972	1	1	0	1.00	–	–	–
2	Allan Spreen	1972-1973	1	5	0	1.00	–	–	–
3	Ida Ezell	1973-1974	1	3	1	.750	–	–	–
4	Janie Tyler	1974-1977	3	11	7	.611	–	–	–
5	Joe Gentry	1977-1980	3	15	8	.652	–	–	–
6	Terry Carlisle	1980-1986	6	38	22	.633	–	–	–
7	Dave Roach	1986-1990	4	23	13	.500	–	1	1
8	Pete Raykovich	1990-1993	3	16	10	.615	–	–	–
9	Dan Colella	1993-2005	12	49	45	.521	–	1	–
10	Matt Kredich	2005–present	19	119	51	.700	2	10	1
Total			51	280	157	.641	2	12	2

== Yearly Record ==
Season	Coach	Meet Record	Conference Meet	NCAA Meet
Independent (AIAW)
1972	Frank Bryant	1-0	–	–
1973	Allan Spreen	5-0	–	–
1974	Ida Ezell	3-1	–	–
1975	Janie Tyler	4-1	–	–
1976	Janie Tyler	4-3	–	–
1977	Janie Tyler	3-3	–	–
1978	Joe Gentry	6-1	–	27th (AIAW)
1979	Joe Gentry	3-3	–	–
1980	Joe Gentry	6-4	–	–
Southeastern Conference
1981	Terry Carlisle	4-4	6th (385.5)	26th (AIAW)
1982	Terry Carlisle	7-4-1	4th (321)	10th (100)
1983	Terry Carlisle	9-5	4th (360)	19th (22)
1984	Terry Carlisle	7-2-1	5th (289)	11th (48)
1985	Terry Carlisle	7-6	5th (366)	33rd (11)
1986	Terry Carlisle	6-6	6th (317.5)	39th (4)
1987	Dave Roach	5-4-1	5th (450.5)	14th (85)
1988	Dave Roach	6-5	2nd (565)	11th (108)
1989	Dave Roach	6-2	2nd (664)	4th (260.5)
1990	Dave Roach	6-2	2nd (722)	18th (50)
1991	Pete Raykovich	5-2	3rd (480)	17th (52.5)
1992	Pete Raykovich	5-3	4th (454.5)	18th (50)
1993	Pete Raykovich	6-5	6th (335.5)	19th (65)
1994	Dan Colella	4-5	6th (346)	13th (96)
1995	Dan Colella	5-3	3rd (465)	12th (112)
1996	Dan Colella	5-3	3rd (472)	9th (186)
1997	Dan Colella	5-4	3rd (501.5)	11th (130)
1998	Dan Colella	4-4	5th (413)	19th (49)
1999	Dan Colella	5-4	5th (478.5)	18th (72)
2000	Dan Colella	2-4	4th (409.5)	28th (17)
2001	Dan Colella	4-5	5th (320)	20th (58)
2002	Dan Colella	3-4	7th (240)	22nd (25)
2003	Dan Colella	4-4	5th (278)	18th (60)
2004	Dan Colella	4-2	4th (264)	28th (23)
2005	Dan Colella	4-3	7th (217)	T-24th (32)
2006	Matt Kredich	5-2	5th (535)	12th (104)
2007	Matt Kredich	4-4	5th (349.5)	10th (127)
2008	Matt Kredich	5-3	4th (477)	8th (179.5)
2009	Matt Kredich	8-2	4th (394.5)	13th (107)
2010	Matt Kredich	3-4	4th (497)	13th (99.5)
2011	Matt Kredich	5-2	4th (466.5)	12th (148)
2012	Matt Kredich	6-1	2nd (629.5)	T-7th (249)
2013	Matt Kredich	8-1	4th (1018)	3rd (325.5)
2014	Matt Kredich	8-1	5th (780)	7th (223)
2015	Matt Kredich	6-5-1	4th (745.5)	11th (125)
2016	Matt Kredich	5-6	2nd (1139.5)	13th (111)
2017	Matt Kredich	4-5	4th (855)	22nd (35)
2018	Matt Kredich	6-2-1	3rd (950.5)	7th (194)
2019	Matt Kredich	5-3	4th (919.5)	8th (185)
2020	Matt Kredich	8-0	1st (1108)	N/A
2021	Matt Kredich	4-2	5th (934)	10th (153)
2022	Matt Kredich	15-1	1st (1313.5)	10th (127)
2023	Matt Kredich	7-4	2nd (950.5)	8th (214)
2024	Matt Kredich	7-3	2nd (1190)	4th (277)
Total		280-157-6	2	0

Note: The 2020 season was canceled after the SEC Championships due to the Coronavirus Pandemic, the NCAA Championships were not held.

== NCAA Individual & Relay champions ==
The Lady Vols have won 8 NCAA Individual & Relay titles all time, including 3 relay titles in 2013.

Individual & Diving
Year	Name	Event	Time/Score
1995	Tracy Bonner	3-Meter Diving	580.20
1996	Nicole DeMan	50 Freestyle	22.59
1998	Kathy Pesek	Platform Diving	659.65
2008	Christine Magnuson	100 Butterfly	50.70

Relay
Year	Name	Event	Time
2013	Caroline Simmons, Faith Johnson, Lindsay Gendron, Kelsey Floyd	200 Freestyle Relay	1:27.14
2013	Lauren Solernou, Molly Hannis, Kelsey Floyd, Faith Johnson	200 Medley Relay	1:34.95
2013	Lauren Solernou, Molly Hannis, Kelsey Floyd, Lindsay Gendron	400 Medley Relay	3:28.51
2019	Meghan Small, Nikol Popov, Madeline Banic, Erika Brown	200 Medley Relay	1:34.10

== Conference Individual Event Champions ==
The Lady Vols have won 99 total SEC individual, relay, and diving titles throughout their history.

Event	Titles
50 Freestyle	12
100 Freestyle	6
200 Freestyle	2
500 Freestyle	1
1650 Freestyle	5
100 Backstroke	2
100 Breaststroke	6
200 Breaststroke	5
100 Butterfly	9
200 Butterfly	2
200 Individual Medley	5
400 Individual Medley	2
1-Meter Diving	4
3-Meter Diving	4
Platform Diving	8
200 Freestyle Relay	6
400 Freestyle Relay	2
800 Freestyle Relay	2
200 Medley Relay	9
400 Medley Relay	7

== Tennessee Lady Volunteers Olympians ==
The Lady Vol swimming program has had 16 Olympians compete since the 1980s, winning 5 medals total. The following list include all of the former and current Olympic participants through the end of the 2024 Paris Olympics.

=== Medalists ===
Athlete	Country	Olympics	Event	Medal
Erika Connolly	United States	2020 Tokyo	4 × 100 m medley relay	Silver
Erika Connolly	United States	2020 Tokyo	4 × 100 m freestyle relay	Bronze
Erika Connolly	United States	2024 Paris	4 × 100 m freestyle relay	Silver
Christine Magnuson	United States	2008 Beijing	100 m butterfly	Silver
Christine Magnuson	United States	2008 Beijing	4 × 100 m medley relay	Silver
Mona McSharry	Ireland	2024 Paris	100 m breaststroke	Bronze
Julia Stowers	United States	2000 Sydney	4 × 200 m free relay	Gold

=== Participants ===
Athlete	Country	Olympics
Tessa Cieplucha	Canada	2020 Tokyo
Annabel Droussiotis	Cyprus	1980 Moscow
Molly Hannis	United States	2016 Rio de Janeiro
Mona McSharry	Ireland	2020 Tokyo
Mona McSharry	Ireland	2024 Paris
Fabiola Molina	Brazil	2000 Sydney
Fabiola Molina	Brazil	2008 Beijing
Fabiola Molina	Brazil	2012 London
Teresa Moodie	Zimbabwe	1996 Atlanta
Martina Moravcikova	Czech Republic	2012 London
Martina Moravcikova	Czech Republic	2016 Rio de Janeiro
Julie Parks	Ireland	1984 Los Angeles
Tjaša Pintar	Slovenia	2016 Rio de Janeiro
Tjaša Pintar	Slovenia	2024 Paris
Cherelle Thompson	Trinidad and Tobago	2020 Tokyo
Kira Toussaint	Netherlands	2016 Rio de Janeiro
Kira Toussaint	Netherlands	2024 Paris
Ellen Walshe	Ireland	2020 Tokyo
Ellen Walshe	Ireland	2024 Paris

== See also ==
- Tennessee Volunteers men's swimming and diving
- Swimming at the Summer Olympics
