= 2005 NCAA Division I Women's Swimming and Diving Championships =

American college aquatic sports competition

- Host city: West Lafayette, Indiana
- Date: March 2005
- Venue(s): Boilermaker Aquatic Center; Purdue University

The 2005 NCAA Women's Division I Swimming and Diving Championships were contested at the 24th annual NCAA-sanctioned swim meet to determine the team and individual national champions of Division I women's collegiate swimming and diving in the United States.

This year's events were hosted by Purdue University at the Boilermaker Aquatic Center in West Lafayette, Indiana.

After three consecutive second-place finishes, Georgia returned to the top of the team standings, finishing 117.5 points ahead of three-time defending champions Auburn. This was the Bulldogs' fourth women's team title.

== Team standings ==
- Note: Top 10 only
- (H) = Hosts
- ^{(DC)} = Defending champions
- Full results

Rank	Team	Points
1st place, gold medalist(s)	Georgia	609 1/2
2nd place, silver medalist(s)	Auburn ^{(DC)}	492
3rd place, bronze medalist(s)	Arizona	440
4	Florida	355
5	Stanford	313
6	Texas	218
7	SMU	170
8	California	149
9	Indiana	112
10	USC	108
17	Purdue (H)	59

== Swimming results ==
Event	Gold		Silver		Bronze	
50 freestyle	Kara Lynn Joyce; Georgia	21.97	Sarah Wanezek; Texas	22.27	Amanda Weir; Georgia	22.28
100 freestyle	Kara Lynn Joyce; Georgia	47.50	Lacey Nymeyer; Arizona	48.56	Jana Kolukanova; Auburn	48.71
200 freestyle	Margaret Hoelzer; Auburn	1:44.60	Amanda Weir; Georgia	1:45.07	Caroline Burckle; Florida	1:46.96
500 freestyle	Emily Mason; Arizona	4:37.11	Caroline Burckle; Florida	4:38.89	Elizabeth Hill; Georgia	4:39.25
1650 freestyle	Flavia Rigamonti; SMU	15:46.84	Hayley Peirsol; Auburn	15:52.48	Laura Conway; Georgia	15:54.97
100 backstroke	Marshi Smith; Arizona	52.82	Margaret Hoelzer; Auburn	52.99	Jenna Gresdal; Arizona	53.33
200 backstroke	Kirsty Coventry; Auburn	1:50.54	Margaret Hoelzer; Auburn	1:52.14	Jessica Hayes; Arizona	1:54.56
100 breaststroke	Caroline Bruce; Stanford	59.55	Lindsey Ertter; Georgia	59.85	Sarah Poewe; Georgia	1:00.19
200 breaststroke	Caroline Bruce; Stanford	2:08.67	Anne Poleska; Alabama	2:09.63	Lindsey Ertter; Georgia	2:09.97
100 butterfly	Mary DeScenza; Georgia	52.11	Whitney Myers; Arizona	52.74	Candace Weiman; Florida	52.75
200 butterfly	Mary DeScenza; Georgia	1:54.19	Emily Mason; Arizona	1:54.79	Kim Vandenberg; UCLA	1:55.08
200 IM	Kirsty Coventry; Auburn	1:54.37	Whitney Myers; Arizona	1:56.43	Caroline Bruce; Stanford	1:57.66
400 IM	Kirsty Coventry; Auburn	4:04.48	Emily Mason; Arizona	4:08.09	Leah Retrum; Florida	4:08.32
200 freestyle relay	Georgia; Kara Lynn Joyce (21.89); Paige Kearns (21.95); Andrea Georoff (22.26); Amanda Weir (22.00)	1:28.10; US, AR	Arizona; Jenna Gresdal (22.41); Marshi Smith (22.31); Courtney Cashion (22.15); Lacey Nymeyer (21.63)	1:28.50	Auburn; Jana Kolukanova (22.68); Kirsty Coventry (22.12); Jenni Anderson (22.37); Kara Denby (22.16)	1:29.33
400 freestyle relay	Georgia; Kara Lynn Joyce (48.02); Paige Kearns (49.08); Mary DeScenza (48.74); Amanda Weir (47.72)	3:13.56	Auburn; Jana Kolukanova (48.87); Margaret Hoelzer (48.45); Emily Kukors (48.56); Kirsty Coventry (48.06)	3:13.94	Arizona; Jenna Gresdal (48.93); Courtney Cashion (48.75); Jessica Hayes (48.81); Lacey Nymeyer (47.81)	3:14.30
800 freestyle relay	Georgia; Mary DeScenza (1:44.14); Kara Lynn Joyce (1:45.42); Elizabeth Hill (1:46.13); Amanda Weir (1:45.34)	7:01.03; AR	Arizona; Emily Mason (1:45.77); Whitney Myers (1:45.29); Jessica Hayes (1:46.55); Lacey Nymeyer (1:45.19)	7:02.80	Auburn; Kirsty Coventry (1:44.48); Emily Kukors (1:46.05); Jana Kolukanova (1:48.02); Margaret Hoelzer (1:45.20)	7:03.75
200 medley relay	Georgia; Samantha Arsenault (24.73); Sarah Poewe (27.94); Mary DeScenza (23.55); Kara Lynn Joyce (21.59)	1:37.81	Texas; Hayley McGregory (25.17); Elizabeth Tinnon (27.33); Connie Brown (24.08); Sarah Wanezek (21.48)	1:38.06	Arizona; Marshi Smith (24.80); Erin Sieper (28.01); Whitney Myers (23.88); Jenna Gresdal (21.72)	1:38.41
400 medley relay	Georgia; Samantha Arsenault (54.01); Sarah Poewe (1:00.29); Mary DeScenza (51.40); Amanda Weir (48.19)	3:33.89	Florida; Maureen Farrell (53.64); Vipa Bernhardt (1:00.30); Candace Weiman (52.36); Caroline Burckle (48.43)	3:34.73	Stanford; Brooke Bishop (54.35); Caroline Bruce (59.51); Dana Kirk (52.53); Lacey Boutwell (48.43)	3:34.82

Legend: US – U.S. Open record; AR – American record;

== Diving results ==
Event	Gold		Silver		Bronze	
1 m diving	QiongJie Huang; Hawaii	327.00	Blythe Hartley; USC	324.90	Nancilea Underwood; Iowa	321.40
3 m diving	Blythe Hartley; USC	586.15	Nancilea Underwood; Iowa	561.84	Carrie McCambridge; Auburn	558.90
Platform diving	Cassandra Cardinell; Kentucky	501.45	Anna Kiess; Houston	478.95	Rui Wang; Hawaii	466.15

== See also ==
- List of college swimming and diving teams
