= 2008 NCAA Division I Women's Swimming and Diving Championships =

American college aquatic sports competition

- Host city: Columbus, Ohio
- Date: March 20–22, 2008
- Venue(s): McCorkle Aquatic Pavilion; Ohio State University

The 2008 NCAA Women's Division I Swimming and Diving Championships were contested at the 27th annual NCAA-sanctioned swim meet to determine the team and individual national champions of Division I women's collegiate swimming and diving in the United States.

This year's events were hosted by the Ohio State University at the McCorkle Aquatic Pavilion in Columbus, Ohio.

Arizona topped the team standings for the first time, finishing 136 points (484–348) ahead of two-time defending champions Auburn. This was the Wildcats' first women's team title. Arizona also captured the 2008 men's title.

== Team standings ==
- Note: Top 10 only
- (H) = Hosts
- ^{(DC)} = Defending champions
- Full results

Rank	Team	Points
1st place, gold medalist(s)	Arizona	484
2nd place, silver medalist(s)	Auburn ^{(DC)}	348
3rd place, bronze medalist(s)	Stanford	343
4	Texas A&M	315
5	California	291
6	Florida	277 1/2
7	Georgia	198
8	Tennessee	179 1/2
9	Michigan	130
10	Indiana	128
15	Ohio State (H)	85

== Swimming results ==
Event	Gold		Silver		Bronze	
50 freestyle	Lara Jackson; Arizona	21.69	Michele King; Tennessee	21.86	Anne Marie May; California	22.00
100 freestyle	Lacey Nymeyer; Arizona	47.50	Julia Wilkinson; Texas A&M	47.56	Christine Magnuson; Tennessee	48.15
200 freestyle	Caroline Burckle; Florida	1:43.10	Lacey Nymeyer; Arizona	1:43.33	Julia Wilkinson; Texas A&M	1:43.64
500 freestyle	Caroline Burckle; Florida	4:33.60; NC	Maggie Bird; Auburn	4:39.15	Kristen Heiss; Texas A&M	4:40.03
1650 freestyle	Emily Brunemann; Michigan	15:53.69	Whitney Sprague; North Carolina	15:57.77	Kelsey Ditto; Georgia	15:59.01
100 backstroke	Gemma Spofforth; Florida	51.78	Hailey Degolia; Arizona	51.89	Kateryna Zubkova; Indiana	52.02
200 backstroke	Gemma Spofforth; Florida	1:50.70	Kateryna Zubkova; Indiana	1:53.17	Kristen Heiss; Texas A&M	1:53.52
100 breaststroke	Rebecca Soni; USC	59.19	Jillian Tyler; Minnesota	59.87	Annie Chandler; Wisconsin	59.98
200 breaststroke	Rebecca Soni; USC	2:06.32; MR	Elizabeth Smith; Stanford	2:08.73	Alia Atkinson; Texas A&M	2:09.48
100 butterfly	Christine Magnuson; Tennessee	50.70	Dana Vollmer; California	51.32	Hailey Degolia; Arizona	51.59
200 butterfly	Saori Haruguchi; Oregon State	1:52.39; MR	Elaine Breeden; Stanford	1:53.27	Ava Ohlgren; Auburn	1:54.64
200 IM	Ava Ohlgren; Auburn	1:53.94	Ariana Kukors; Washington	1:55.26	Emily Kukors; Auburn	1:55.28
400 IM	Julia Smit; Stanford	4:02.41	Ava Ohlgren; Auburn	4:04.07	Ariana Kukors; Washington	4:04.82
200 freestyle relay	Arizona; Lara Jackson (21.92); Lacey Nymeyer (21.46); Anna Turner (21.83); Taylor Baughman (21.69)	1:26.90; US, AR	California; Madison Kennedy (22.08); Hannah Wilson (22.19); Emily Silver (21.56); Dana Vollmer (21.69)	1:27.52	Auburn; Ava Ohlgren (22.58); Kara Denby (21.60); Emily Kukors (22.35); Emile Ewing (22.26)	1:28.79
400 freestyle relay	Arizona; Lacey Nymeyer (47.60); Anna Turner (48.03); Lara Jackson (47.95); Taylor Baughman (47.76)	3:11.34; US, AR	California; Madison Kennedy (48.38); Hannah Wilson (48.61); Emily Silver (48.24); Dana Vollmer (47.80)	3:13.03	Texas A&M; Christine Marshall (48.82); Codie Hansen (48.76); Julia Wilkinson (47.10); Triin Aljand (48.40)	3:13.08
800 freestyle relay	Arizona; Justine Schluntz (1:45.59); Lacey Nymeyer (1:43.55); Leone Vorster (1:44.92); Taylor Baughman (1:44.63)	6:58.69; MR	Texas A&M; Christine Marshall (1:44.72); Kristen Heiss (1:45.80); Codie Hansen (1:45.60); Julia Wilkinson (1:43.38)	6:59.50	California; Dana Vollmer (1:44.90); Lauren Boyle (1:45.82); Madison Kennedy (1:45.53); Emily Silver (1:44.84)	7:01.09
200 medley relay	Arizona; Hailey Degolia (23.67); Annie Chandler (26.89); Lara Jackson (23.12); Anna Turner (21.61)	1:35.29; US, AR	Stanford; Fiona O'Donnell-McCarthy (25.24); Caroline Bruce (27.59); Elaine Breeden (23.16); Brooke Bishop (21.64)	1:37.63	Texas A&M; Julia Wilkinson (24.86); Alia Atkinson (27.84); Triin Aljand (22.68); Sarah Woods (22.34)	1:37.72
400 medley relay	Arizona; Hailey Degolia (51.67); Annie Chandler (58.32); Ana Agy (52.06); Lacey Nymeyer (47.01)	3:29.06; US, AR	Auburn; Margo McCawley (52.94); Kara Denby (1:00.00); Ava Ohlgren (51.68); Emily Kukors (48.22)	3:32.84	Stanford; Julia Smit (53.87); Caroline Bruce (1:00.08); Elaine Breeden (51.44); Brooke Bishop (48.38)	3:33.87

Legend: US – U.S. Open record; NC – NCAA record; MR – Meet record; AR – American record;

== Diving results ==
Event	Gold		Silver		Bronze	
1 m diving	Emma Friesen; Hawaii	336.20	Mary Yarrison; Texas	331.60	Brittney Feldman; Indiana	323.75
3 m diving	Chelsea Davis; Ohio State	365.85	Bianca Alvarez; Ohio State	354.50	Kathryn Kelly; Texas	353.15
Platform diving	Brittany Viola; Miami	362.60	Margaret Hassan; Stanford	347.20	Kara Cook; Purdue	311.00

== See also ==
- List of college swimming and diving teams
