= 2007 NCAA Division I Women's Swimming and Diving Championships =

American college aquatic sports competition

- Host city: Minneapolis, Minnesota
- Date: March 8–10, 2007
- Venue(s): University Aquatic Center; University of Minnesota

The 2007 NCAA Women's Division I Swimming and Diving Championships were contested at the 26th annual NCAA-sanctioned swim meet to determine the team and individual national champions of Division I women's collegiate swimming and diving in the United States.

This year's events were hosted by the University of Minnesota at the University Aquatic Center in Minneapolis, Minnesota.

Defending champions Auburn again topped the team standings, finishing 58 points (535−477) ahead of Arizona. This was the Tigers' fifth women's team title and fifth in six seasons.

== Team standings ==
- Note: Top 10 only
- (H) = Hosts
- ^{(DC)} = Defending champions
- Full results

Rank	Team	Points
1st place, gold medalist(s)	Auburn ^{(DC)}	535
2nd place, silver medalist(s)	Arizona	477
3rd place, bronze medalist(s)	California	372 1/2
4	Stanford	333
5	Georgia	290
6	Texas	220
7	Florida	203
8	Texas A&M	198
9	Michigan	191
10	Tennessee	127
13	Minnesota (H)	59

== Swimming results ==
Event	Gold		Silver		Bronze	
50 freestyle	Kara Lynn Joyce; Georgia	21.71	Lara Jackson; Arizona	21.73	Lacey Nymeyer; Arizona	21.80
100 freestyle	Kara Lynn Joyce; Georgia	47.24	Lacey Nymeyer; Arizona	47.34	Emily Silver; California	47.45
200 freestyle	Lacey Nymeyer; Arizona	1:43.49	Emily Kukors; Auburn	1:43.72	Erin Reilly; California	1:44.66
500 freestyle	Adrienne Binder; Auburn	4:36.96	Caroline Burckle; Florida	4:38.28	Alicia Aemisegger; Princeton	4:38.88
1650 freestyle	Hayley Peirsol; Auburn	15:45.92	Adrienne Binder; Auburn	15:53.44	Whitney Sprague; North Carolina	15:58.74
100 backstroke	Rachel Goh; Auburn	51.97	Hailey Degolia; Arizona	52.60	Leila Vaziri; Indiana	52.02
200 backstroke	Gemma Spofforth; Florida	1:52.96	Julia Smit; Stanford	1:53.39	Aleksandra Putra; Georgia	1:53.71
100 breaststroke	Jessica Hardy; California	59.43	Annie Chandler; Wisconsin	1:00.03	Elizabeth Tinnon; Texas	1:00.32
200 breaststroke	Rebecca Soni; USC	2:08.23	Siow Yi Ting; Wisconsin	2:10.42	Caroline Bruce; Stanfordd	2:11.06
100 butterfly	Dana Vollmer; California	50.69	Elaine Breeden; Stanford	51.72	Caitlin Andrew; Arizona State	52.02
200 butterfly	Elaine Breeden; Stanford	1:53.02; MR	Whitney Myers; Arizona	1:53.75	Dana Vollmer; California	1:54.30
200 IM	Whitney Myers; Arizona	1:54.89	Ava Ohlgren; Auburn	1:55.67	Julia Smit; Stanford	1:56.43
400 IM	Ava Ohlgren; Auburn	4:04.08	Alicia Aemisegger; Princeton	4:04.80	Julia Smit; Stanford	4:06.10
200 freestyle relay	Arizona; Lara Jackson (21.91); Lacey Nymeyer (21.24); Anna Turner (22.27); Lindsey Kelly (21.81)	1:27.23; US, AR	Georgia; Kara Lynn Joyce (21.69); Jessica Cole (22.07); Anne-Marie Botek (22.51); Anna Miller (22.17)	1:28.44	Michigan; Kaitlyn Brady (22.40); Margaret Kelly (22.16); Hannah Smith (22.29); Lindsay Smith (21.95)	1:28.80
400 freestyle relay	California; Emily Silver (48.24); Erin Reilly (48.72); Jessica Hardy (48.05); Dana Vollmer (47.12)	3:12.13; US, AR	Arizona; Lacey Nymeyer (48.05); Lindsey Kelly (48.49); Anna Turner (48.83); Whitney Meyers (47.99)	3:13.36	Georgia; Jessica Cole (48.90); Anna Miller (49.02); Kelly McNichols (49.39); Kara Lynn Joyce (47.00)	3:14.31
800 freestyle relay	California; Dana Vollmer (1:44.18); Emily Silver (1:44.98); Blake Hayter (1:48.07); Erin Reilly (1:43.66)	7:00.89; AR	Auburn; Ava Ohlgren (1:45.64); Emile Ewing (1:46.68); Emily Kukors (1:43.39); Adrienne Binder (1:45.34)	7:01.05	Georgia; Claire Maust; Jessica Cole; Anna Miller (1:46.55); Kara Lynn Joyce (1:43.88)	7:02.97
200 medley relay	Arizona; Hailey Degolia (24.24); Annie Chandler (27.18); Lara Jackson (22.77); Lindsey Kelly (21.90)	1:36.09; US, AR	California; Lauren Rogers (24.90); Jessica Hardy (27.00); Dana Vollmer (22.92); Emily Silver (21.78)	1:36.60	Auburn; Rachel Goh (24.43); Kara Denby (27.41); Margo McCawley (24.14); Emily Kukors (22.08)	1:38.06
400 medley relay	California; Lauren Rogers (53.40); Jessica Hardy; Dana Vollmer; Emily Silver (47.59)	3:30.18; US, AR	Arizona; Hailey Degolia (52.53); Annie Chandler (59.70); Whitney Meyers (51.64); Lacey Nymeyer (47.02)	3:30.89	Stanford; Julia Smit (53.95); Caroline Bruce (1:00.33); Elaine Breeden (51.92); Brooke Bishop (48.66)	3:34.86

Legend: US – U.S. Open record; MR – Meet record; AR – American record;

== Diving results ==
Event	Gold		Silver		Bronze	
1 m diving	Cassidy Krug; Stanford	361.55	Christina Loukas; Indiana	360.35	Jenna Dreyer; Miami	350.55
3 m diving	Cassidy Krug; Stanford	407.10	Anastasia Pozdniakova; Houston	367.15	Jessica Livingston; Texas	353.75
Platform diving	Jessica Livingston; Texas	357.85	Lindsay Weigle; Indiana	356.55	Taryn Ignacio; Kentucky	332.80

== See also ==
- List of college swimming and diving teams
