= 2006 NCAA Division I Women's Swimming and Diving Championships =

American college aquatic sports competition

- Host city: (Georgia (U.S. state)) Athens, Georgia
- Date: March 2006
- Venue(s): Gabrielsen Natatorium; University of Georgia

The 2006 NCAA Women's Division I Swimming and Diving Championships were contested at the 25th annual NCAA-sanctioned swim meet to determine the team and individual national champions of Division I women's collegiate swimming and diving in the United States.

This year's events were hosted at Gabrielsen Natatorium at the University of Georgia in Athens, Georgia.

Auburn returned to the top of the team standings after a one year absence, finishing a mere three points (518.5−515.5) ahead of hosts and defending champions Georgia. This was the Tigers' fourth women's team title and fourth in five seasons.

== Team standings ==
- Note: Top 10 only
- (H) = Hosts
- ^{(DC)} = Defending champions
- Full results

Rank	Team	Points
1st place, gold medalist(s)	Auburn	518 1/2
2nd place, silver medalist(s)	Georgia (H) ^{(DC)}	515 1/2
3rd place, bronze medalist(s)	Arizona	415
4	California	291
5	Stanford	209
6	USC	193
7	SMU	161 1/2
8	Texas	151
9	Wisconsin	146
10	Florida	135

== Swimming results ==
Event	Gold		Silver		Bronze	
50 freestyle	Kara Lynn Joyce; Georgia	21.63; US, AR	Lacey Nymeyer; Arizona	22.10	Brooke Bishop; Stanford	22.17
100 freestyle	Kara Lynn Joyce; Georgia	47.41	Lacey Nymeyer; Arizona	48.43	Emily Silver; California	48.47
200 freestyle	Kara Lynn Joyce; Georgia	1:43.96	Erin Reilly; California	1:44.63	Emily Kukors; Auburn	1:44.66
500 freestyle	Laura Conway; Georgia	4:40.01	Hayley Peirsol; Auburn	4:41.78	Erin Reilly; California	4:41.84
1650 freestyle	Hayley Peirsol; Auburn	15:49.48	Flavia Rigamonti; SMU	15:54.67	Adrienne Binder; Auburn	15:57.64
100 backstroke	Rachel Goh; Auburn	52.35	Jenna Gresdal; Arizona	52.74	Brielle White; Virginia	52.76
200 backstroke	Helen Silver; Florida	1:53.01	Aleksandra Putra; Georgia	1:54.59	Kelly Harrigan; Rutgers	1:54.77
100 breaststroke	Jessica Hardy; California	1:00.02	Rebecca Soni; USC	1:00.07	Vipa Bernhardt; Florida	1:00.43
200 breaststroke	Rebecca Soni; USC	2:09.37	Vipa Bernhardt; Florida	2:10.13	Alicia Jensen; Auburn	2:10.81
100 butterfly	Mary DeScenza; Georgia	51.56	Caitlin Andrew; Arizona State	52.23	Dana Kirk; Stanford	52.63
200 butterfly	Mary DeScenza; Georgia	1:53.78	Kim Vandenberg; UCLA	1:56.02	Whitney Myers; Arizona	1:56.26
200 IM	Whitney Myers; Arizona	1:54.88	Tricia Harm; Georgia	1:57.28	Emily Kukors; Auburn	1:57.50
400 IM	Whitney Myers; Arizona	4:06.32	Julie Stupp; Auburn	4:09.22	Kristen Caverly; Stanford	4:09.70
200 freestyle relay	Arizona; Courtney Cashion (22.57); Jenna Gresdal (21.82); Anna Turner (22.16); Lacey Nymeyer (21.43)	1:27.98; US	Georgia; Kara Lynn Joyce (21.69) =US, =AR; Tricia Harm (22.29); Anna Miller (22.51); Jessica Cole (22.30)	1:28.79	Auburn; Kara Denby (22.72); Jana Kolukanova (22.27); Hannah Smith (22.63); Emily Kukors (22.63)	1:30.25
400 freestyle relay	Arizona; Courtney Cashion (48.87); Jenna Gresdal (48.26); Whitney Myers (48.21); Lacey Nymeyer (47.43)	3:12.77; US	Georgia; Mary DeScenza (48.31); Tricia Harm (49.06); Jessica Cole (49.09); Kara Lynn Joyce (46.92)	3:13.38; AR	Auburn; Kara Denby (49.35); Jana Kolukanova (48.37); Jeri Moss (48.67); Emily Kukors (48.61)	3:15.00
800 freestyle relay	Georgia; Mary DeScenza (1:44.63); Jessica Cole (1:47.38); Claire Maust (1:46.73); Kara Lynn Joyce (1:45.01)	7:03.75	Arizona; Whitney Myers (1:45.59); Lacey Nymeyer (1:45.07); Courtney Cashion (1:47.96); Anna Turner (1:48.48)	7:07.10	Auburn; Jana Kolukanova (1:48.10); Emily Kukors (1:45.97); Jeri Moss (1:46.40); Adrienne Binder (1:46.65)	7:07.12
200 medley relay	Georgia; Tricia Harm (24.63); Sarah Poewe (28.00); Mary DeScenza (23.22); Kara Lynn Joyce (21.39)	1:37.24	Arizona; Jenna Gresdal (25.05); Erin Sieper (27.53); Lara Jackson (24.08); Courtney Cashion (22.12)	1:38.78	Florida State; Christie Raleigh (24.98); Lauren Sparg (27.52); Lauren Brick (24.29); Carrie Ellis (22.18)	1:38.97
400 medley relay	Arizona; Jenna Gresdal (52.52); Erin Sieper (59.95); Whitney Myers (51.90); Lacey Nymeyer (47.33)	3:31.70	USC; Hayley McGregory (53.53); Rebecca Soni (58.94); Kristen Lahey (53.42); Rhi Jeffrey (48.08)	3:33.97	California; Helen Silver (53.97); Jessica Hardy (58.77); Erin Reilly (52.75); Emily Silver (48.61)	3:34.10

Legend: US – U.S. Open record; AR – American record;

== Diving results ==
Event	Gold		Silver		Bronze	
1 m diving	Blythe Hartley; USC	353.50	Allison Brennan; South Carolina	326.10	QiongJie Huang; Hawaii	324.05
3 m diving	Blythe Hartley; USC	373.15	Christina Loukas; Indiana	371.40	Corey Gerlach; Auburn	365.65
Platform diving	Taryn Ignacio; Kentucky	335.30	Rui Wang; Hawaii	320.00	Lindsay Weigle; Indiana	317.05

== See also ==
- List of college swimming and diving teams
