= Tashy Bohm =

American swimmer

Personal information
- Born: 1978 or 1979 (age 47–48)^{a}
- Height: 5 ft 11 in (1.80 m)

Sport
- Sport: Swimming
- Strokes: Backstroke, freestyle & butterfly
- College team: Northwestern University

Tashiana "Tashy" Bohm is an American former backstroke, freestyle and butterfly competition swimmer who swam collegiately for the Northwestern Wildcats. Bohm was raised in New Jersey and attended West Morris Central High School.

While in high school, Bohm became a 2-time National YMCA Swimming Champion and a high school All-American. Bohm established national, state and local records in high school. She held the American public high school short course 100-meter backstroke record for 7 years. Bohm was a three-time New Jersey State Interscholastic Athletic Association (NJSIAA) state champion in the 100-yard backstroke.

Bohm set several school records as at Northwestern University and is a three-time (1999–2001) Big Ten Conference champion in the women's 200-yard backstroke. She is also recognized as a 3-time NCAA All-American honorable mention honoree (2000 and 2001 200-yard backstroke, and 2001 4x200-yard freestyle relay).

== High school career ==
Raised in the Long Valley section of Washington Township, Morris County, New Jersey, Bohm attended West Morris Central High School. Her time of 1:04.62 stood as a national public high school short course 100-meter backstroke record from February 8, 1997, until Lauren English posted a 1:04.23 time on February 7, 2004, at the Morris County Championships, according to the National Interscholastic Swimming Coaches Association (NISCA). The record had been previously officially set in 1997 by New Jersian Jennelle Ritchie at 1:04.86 and surpassed by New Jersian Kelly Hecking in an unrecognized hand-timed 1:03.10. Prior to Ritchie, New Jersian Lisa Iori had held the record since 1980. Bohm had several Morris County Championship records that were eventually broken.

Bohm won the 100-yard backstroke in consecutive years at the NJSIAA Meet of Champions from 1994 through 1996. In both 1995 and 1996, Hecking finished second. In the 1997 NJSIAA meet 3-time defending champion Bohm finished second to Hecking who eclipsed Bohm's 56.99 state record with a 55.94 in the prelims before beating Bohm by a 55.64 to 56.84 margin in the finals. At the same NJSIAA championship meet, Bohm touched second to Shannon Lynch in the 100-yard butterfly by a margin of 0.10 seconds.

Outside of scholastic competition, Bohm placed 1st in the 100- and 200-meter backstroke swimming for the Somerset Hills YMCA at the 1995 National YMCA Swimming Long Course Championship. Despite having the fourth-fastest seeding run in the 50-meter she did not post times in the trials or finals. She also placed 11th in the 100 meter butterfly. Bohm had placed 3rd, 3rd and 6th, respectively, in the 50-, 100- and 200-meter backstrokes in the 1994 National YMCA Long course championship. Bohm placed 7th and 3rd, respectively, in the 100- and 200-yard backstroke events at the 1995 YMCA Nationals (short course). She had placed 5th and 11th in the 1994 YMCA Nationals (short course). Bohm did not return to contest the backstroke at either the long course or short course National YMCA championships in 1996 or 1997.

As a senior, she was a 1997 All-American selection by the NISCA in the 100-yard backstroke. She was an All-American honorable mention in the 100-yard butterfly.

== College career ==
Bohm established several records at Northwestern University. Bohm's personal best collegiate performances included 1:57.34 in the 200-yard backstroke in 2001, 55.05 in the 100-yard backstroke in 2000 and 3:37.99 as a member of the 2000 4x100-yard medley relay team (Bohm, Amy Balcerzak, Merritt Adams, Courtney Allen). Her 200-yard time was eventually surpassed by Genny Szymanski whose best time was 1:56.13 in 2009. The medley record time was surpassed by several 2019 relay combinations. Bohm's 100-yard backstroke time was 0.10 off of Dominique Diezi's 1998 school record time of 54.95 and remained the second-fastest time until Liza Engstrom posted a 54.81 time in 2008. During Bohm's time at Northwestern, although the team finished in 3rd place at the Big Ten Championships from 1998 to 2000 and 4th place in 2001, they finished in the top 10 in the NCAA championship tournament and first or second among Big Ten teams in 1998 (10th/2nd), 1999 (9th/2nd) and 2000 (6th/1st), each of which was an all-time best finish in school history. Bohm competed at the 2000 United States Olympic trials, placing 47th in the 100-meter backstroke (1:05.75) and 59th in the 200-meter backstroke (2:21.76).

Bohm earned the 200-yard backstroke championship at the 1999 Big Ten Championship with a time of 1:58.12. At the 2001 Big Ten Championships, Bohm defended her 1999 and 2000 200-yard backstroke championships with a new school record time of 1:57.61, while being the team's stylistic jester. At the 2001 NCAA Division I Women's Swimming and Diving Championships, she achieved her second 200-yard backstroke All-American Honorable mention in 12th place with a time of 1:57.49 (after a prelims time of 1:57.34) and ahead of Hecking who finished 13th and matched her 12th place finish the subsequent year.

== Notes ==
^a Cited competitions results show ages for Bohm from National YMCA competitions and a U.S. Olympic Trial. I.e., Bohm was listed as age 16 for August 1–4, 1995, and April 5–6, 1995, competition dates and age 15 for August 2–5, 1994, and April 13–14, 1994, competition dates at YMCA Nationals. She was listed as age 21 for both of her events at the August 9–16, 2000, U.S. Olympic trials. All ages are consistent and suggest she was born between August 1978 and April 5, 1979, if the ages in the results represent the age on the date of the competitions. The exact August date to start the range depends on the date of the latest of her competitions at the Olympic trials.
