= 2009 NCAA Division I Women's Swimming and Diving Championships =

American college aquatic sports competition

- Host city: College Station, Texas
- Date: March 19–21, 2009
- Venue(s): Student Recreation Center Natatorium; Texas A&M University

The 2009 NCAA Women's Division I Swimming and Diving Championships were contested from March 19–21, 2009 at the 28th annual NCAA-sanctioned swim meet to determine the team and individual national champions of Division I women's collegiate swimming and diving in the United States.

This year's events were hosted by Texas A&M University at the Student Recreation Center Natatorium in College Station, Texas.

California topped the team standings for the first time, finishing 11 points (411.5–400.5) ahead of Georgia. This was the Golden Bears' first women's team title.

== Team standings ==
- Note: Top 10 only
- (H) = Hosts
- ^{(DC)} = Defending champions
- Full results

Rank	Team	Points
1st place, gold medalist(s)	California	411 1/2
2nd place, silver medalist(s)	Georgia	400 1/2
3rd place, bronze medalist(s)	Arizona ^{(DC)}	389
4	Stanford	312 1/2
5	Texas	307
6	Auburn	281 1/2
7	Florida	239 1/2
8	Texas A&M (H)	186
9	USC	157
10	Indiana	152

== Swimming results ==
Event	Gold		Silver		Bronze	
50 freestyle	Lara Jackson; Arizona	21.40	Anne-Marie Botek; Georgia	21.80	Michele King; Tennessee	21.82
100 freestyle	Dana Vollmer; California	47.17	Karlee Bispo; Texas	47.48	Julia Smit; Stanford	47.64
200 freestyle	Dana Vollmer; California	1:42.01; MR	Morgan Scroggy; Georgia	1:42.90	Allison Schmitt; Georgia	1:43.09
500 freestyle	Allison Schmitt; Georgia	4:35.17	Wendy Trott; Georgia	4:36.20	Maggie Bird; Auburn	4:36.89
1650 freestyle	Wendy Trott; Georgia	15:45.49	Whitney Sprague; North Carolina	15:46.57	Alicia Aemisegger; Princeton	15:50.60
100 backstroke	Gemma Spofforth; Florida	50.55	Rachel Goh; Auburn	51.61	Ana Agy; Arizona	51.65
200 backstroke	Gemma Spofforth; Florida	1:49.11; MR	Teresa Crippen; Florida	1:51.59	Stephanie Proud; Florida	1:51.81
100 breaststroke	Rebecca Soni; USC	58.36; MR	Jillian Tyler; Minnesota	58.53	Ashley Wanland; Wisconsin	59.14
200 breaststroke	Rebecca Soni; USC	2:05.52	Alia Atkinson; Texas A&M	2:06.99	Jillian Tyler; Minnesota	2:07.92
100 butterfly	Amanda Sims; California	51.28	Elaine Breeden; Stanford	51.34	Hannah Wilson; California	51.47
200 butterfly	Elaine Breeden; Stanford	1:50.98; MR	Kathleen Hersey; Texas	1:51.18	Katinka Hosszú; USC	1:53.45
200 IM	Julia Smit; Stanford	1:52.79; US, AR	Kathleen Hersey; Texas	1:53.33	Ava Ohlgren; Auburn	1:54.08
400 IM	Julia Smit; Stanford	4:00.56; US, AR	Katinka Hosszú; USC	4:01.49	Kathleen Hersey; Texas	4:01.91
200 freestyle relay	Arizona; Lara Jackson (21.27) US, AR; Lindsey Kelly (21.75); Justine Schluntz (21.59); Taylor Baughman (21.59)	1:26.20; US, AR	California; Liv Jensen (22.09); Hannah Wilson (21.70); Madison Kennedy (21.54); Dana Vollmer (21.15)	1:26.48	Auburn; Arianna Vanderpool-Wallace (22.10); Emile Ewing (21.81); Melissa Marik (21.90); Caitlin Geary (21.67)	1:27.48
400 freestyle relay	California; Hannah Wilson (47.91); Liv Jensen (47.53); Erica Dagg (47.98); Dana Vollmer (46.46)	3:09.88; US	Stanford; Kate Dwelley (47.50); Samantha Woodward (48.10); Elaine Breeden (48.32); Julia Smit (47.22)	3:11.14; AR	Texas; Karlee Bispo (47.56); Chang Hee-jin (47.79); Katie Riefenstahl (48.59); Kathleen Hersey (47.75)	3:11.69
800 freestyle relay	California; Sara Isaković (1:43.15); Hannah Wilson (1:44.15); Liv Jensen (1:43.64); Dana Vollmer (1:41.75)	6:52.69; US	Georgia; Allison Schmitt (1:43.53); Chelsea Nauta (1:43.50); Aleksandra Putra (1:44.47); Morgan Scroggy (1:43.55)	6:55.05	Texas; Karlee Bispo (1:44.32); Leah Gingrich (1:45.12); Katie Riefenstahl (1:45.13); Kathleen Hersey (1:43.86)	6:58.43
200 medley relay	Georgia; Kristen Shickora (24.48); Kelly McNichols (26.84); Lisa Caprioglio (23.71); Anne-Marie Botek (21.42)	1:36.45	Wisconsin; Maggie Meyer (24.45); Ashley Wanland (27.01); Christine Zwiegers (23.74); Rebecca Thompson (21.33)	1:36.53	Tennessee; Jenny Connolly (24.03); Jamie Saffer (27.34); Tricia Weaner (24.03); Michele King (21.42)	1:36.82
400 medley relay	Arizona; Ana Agy (51.13); Annie Chandler (57.95); Lara Jackson (51.80); Justine Schluntz (47.43)	3:28.81; US, AR	California; Lauren Rogers (51.96); Alexandra Ellis (1:00.18); Hannah Wilson (51.49); Dana Vollmer (46.64)	3:30.27	USC; Kristen Lahey (52.11); Rebecca Soni (58.07); Katinka Hosszú (51.23); Rachael Waller (49.26)	3:30.67

Legend: US – U.S. Open record; MR – Meet record; AR – American record;

== Diving results ==
Event	Gold		Silver		Bronze	
1 m diving	Anastasia Pozdniakova; Houston	351.15	Christina Loukas; Indiana	339.80	Emma Friesen; Hawaii	331.35
3 m diving	Christina Loukas; Indiana	337.75	Anastasia Pozdniakova; Houston	386.10	Brittney Feldman; Indiana	366.90
Platform diving	Kristen Davies; NC State	339.65	Jessica Livingston; Texas	321.50	Shelby Cullinan; Texas	310.70

== See also ==
- List of college swimming and diving teams
