= 2002 NCAA Division I Women's Swimming and Diving Championships =

American college aquatic sports competition

- Host city: Austin, Texas
- Date: March 2002
- Venue(s): Lee and Joe Jamail Texas Swimming Center; University of Texas

The 2002 NCAA Women's Division I Swimming and Diving Championships were contested at the 21st annual NCAA-sanctioned swim meet to determine the team and individual national champions of Division I women's collegiate swimming and diving in the United States.

This year's events were hosted by the University of Texas at the Lee and Joe Jamail Texas Swimming Center in Austin, Texas.

Auburn topped the team standings for the first time, finishing 58 points ahead of three-time defending champions Georgia. It was the Tigers' first and the first for coach David Marsh.

== Team standings ==
- Note: Top 10 only
- (H) = Hosts
- ^{(DC)} = Defending champions
- Full results

| Rank | Team | Points |
|---|---|---|
| 1st place, gold medalist(s) | Auburn | 474 |
| 2nd place, silver medalist(s) | Georgia ^{(DC)} | 386 |
| 3rd place, bronze medalist(s) | Stanford | 301 |
| 4 | USC | 300 1/2 |
| 5 | Arizona | 291 |
| 6 | Texas (H) | 267 1/2 |
| 7 | Florida | 249 |
| 8 | California | 245 |
| 9 | SMU | 178 |
| 10 | Arizona State; Indiana | 136 |

== Swimming results ==
| Event | Gold | | Silver | | Bronze | |
|---|---|---|---|---|---|---|
| 50 freestyle | Maritza Correia; Georgia | 21.69; US, AR | Mandy Mularz; Rice | 22.17 | Eileen Coparropa; Auburn | 22.39 |
| 100 freestyle | Maritza Correia; Georgia | 47.56; US, AR | Stefanie Williams; Georgia | 48.37 | Sarah Tolar; Arizona | 48.78 |
| 200 freestyle | Sarah Tolar; Arizona | 1:44.66 | Stefanie Williams; Georgia | 1:44.88 | Jessi Perruquet; North Carolina | 1:45.65 |
| 500 freestyle | Flavia Rigamonti; SMU | 4:40.13 | Jessica Foschi; Stanford | 4:41.10 | Magda Dyszkiewicz; Auburn | 4:41.98 |
| 1650 freestyle | Flavia Rigamonti; SMU | 15:52.28 | Janelle Atkinson; Florida | 16:01.01 | Cara Lane; Virginia | 16:04.54 |
| 100 backstroke | Natalie Coughlin; California | 49.97; US, AR | Susan Woessner; Indiana | 53.23 | Beth Botsford; Arizona | 53.45 |
| 200 backstroke | Natalie Coughlin; California | 1:49.52; US, AR | Alenka Kejžar; SMU | 1:54.18 | Kirsty Coventry; Auburn | 1:54.37 |
| 100 breaststroke | Tara Kirk; Stanford | 59.03 | Maggie Bowen; Auburn | 59.94 | Anne Poleska; Alabama | 1:00.08 |
| 200 breaststroke | Tara Kirk; Stanford | 2:07.36; US, AR | Ágnes Kovács; Arizona State | 2:07.64 | Anne Poleska; Alabama | 2:07.86 |
| 100 butterfly | Natalie Coughlin; California | 50.01; US, AR | Shelly Ripple; Stanford | 51.50 | Joscelin Yeo; Texas | 52.52 |
| 200 butterfly | Shelly Ripple; Stanford | 1:53.23 | Georgina Lee; USC | 1:54.92 | Rebecca Harper; Florida | 1:55.66 |
| 200 IM | Maggie Bowen; Auburn | 1:53.91; US, AR | Shelly Ripple; Stanford | 1:55.58 | Alenka Kejžar; SMU | 1:56.38 |
| 400 IM | Maggie Bowen; Auburn | 4:04.69 | Alenka Kejžar; SMU | 4:06.70 | Mirjana Boševska; Virginia | 4:09.75 |
| 200 freestyle relay | Georgia; Stefanie Williams (22.39); Neka Mabry (22.45); Paige Kearns (22.68); Maritza Correia (21.22) | 1:28.74; US, AR | Auburn; Becky Short (22.42); Maggie Bowen (22.28); Cassidy Maxwell (22.39); Eileen Coparropa (21.83) | 1:28.92 | Texas; Joscelin Yeo (22.66); Sarah Wanezek (22.31); Kelley Robins (22.38); Erin Phenix (21.91) | 1:29.26 |
| 400 freestyle relay | Georgia; Stefanie Williams (48.35); Neka Mabry (49.13); Paige Kearns (49.20); Maritza Correia (47.03) | 3:13.71; US, AR | Auburn; Becky Short (48.79); Eileen Coparropa (47.87); Kirsty Coventry (49.06); Maggie Bowen (48.16) | 3:13.88 | Arizona; Jenny Vanker (49.82); Sarah Tolar (48.23); Jessica Hayes (49.38); Katie Zimbone (49.31) | 3:16.74 |
| 800 freestyle relay | Arizona; Emily Mason (1:46.14); Jenny Vanker (1:47.65); Jessica Hayes (1:47.48); Sarah Tolar (1:43.83) | 7:05.10 | Auburn; Magda Dyszkiewicz (1:47.82); Heather Kemp (1:46.35); Cassidy Maxwell (1:48.17); Maggie Bowen (1:44.36) | 7:06.70 | Georgia; Stefanie Williams (1:46.65); Julie Hardt (1:48.91); Paige Kearns (1:45.76); Maritza Correia (1:45.45) | 7:06.77 |
| 200 medley relay | Stanford; Amy Wagner (25.25); Tara Kirk (26.96); Shelly Ripple (23.33); Lacey Boutwell (22.25) | 1:37.79; AR | California; Natalie Coughlin (23.41); Staciana Stitts (27.31); Alice Henriques (24.60); Danielle Becks (22.56) | 1:37.88 | Auburn; Jenni Anderson (25.37); Laura Swander (27.11); Demeraeso Christianson (23.75); Eileen Coparropa (21.71) | 1:37.94 |
| 400 medley relay | Stanford; Amy Wagner (53.80); Tara Kirk (58.16); Shelly Ripple (51.32); Lacey Boutwell (48.46) | 3:31.74; US, AR | California; Natalie Coughlin (50.57); Staciana Stitts (59.68); Alice Henriques (53.76); Danielle Becks (48.54) | 3:32.55 | Auburn; Kirsty Coventry (54.52); Maggie Bowen (58.62); Demeraeso Christianson (52.55); Eileen Coparropa (48.84) | 3:34.53 |

Legend: US – U.S. Open record; AR – American record;

== Diving results ==
| Event | Gold | | Silver | | Bronze | |
|---|---|---|---|---|---|---|
| 1 m diving | Blythe Hartley; USC | 350.85 | Yuliya Pakhalina; Houston | 320.40 | Sara Reiling; Indiana | 320.15 |
| 3 m diving | Yuliya Pakhalina; Houston | 625.05 | Sara Reiling; Indiana | 581.90 | Blythe Hartley; USC | 567.80 |
| Platform diving | Blythe Hartley; USC | 460.35 | Megahn Zack; Texas A&M | 435.90 | Nicole Pohorenec; Texas | 430.00 |

== See also ==
- List of college swimming and diving teams
