= 1996 NCAA Division I Women's Swimming and Diving Championships =

American college aquatic sports competition

- Host city: Ann Arbor, Michigan
- Date(s): March 1996
- Venue(s): Donald B. Canham Natatorium; University of Michigan

The 1996 NCAA Women's Division I Swimming and Diving Championships were contested at the 15th annual NCAA-sanctioned swim meet to determine the team and individual national champions of Division I women's collegiate swimming and diving in the United States.

This year's events were hosted by the University of Michigan at the Donald B. Canham Natatorium in Ann Arbor, Michigan.

Four-time defending champions Stanford again topped the team standings, finishing 81 points ahead of SMU. It was the Cardinal's eighth overall women's team title.

== Team standings ==
- Note: Top 10 only
- (H) = Hosts
- ^{(DC)} = Defending champions
- Full results

Rank	Team	Points
1st place, gold medalist(s)	Stanford ^{(DC)}	478
2nd place, silver medalist(s)	SMU	397
3rd place, bronze medalist(s)	Michigan (H)	363 1/2
4	USC	356
5	Georgia	268
6	Arizona	256
7	Florida	220
8	Texas	189
9	Tennessee	186
10	Nebraska	167

== See also ==
- List of college swimming and diving teams
