= 2013 NCAA Division I Women's Swimming and Diving Championships =

American college aquatic sports competition

- Host city: Indianapolis, Indiana
- Date: March 2013
- Venue: Indiana University Natatorium

The 2013 NCAA Women's Division I Swimming and Diving Championships were contested at the 32nd annual NCAA-sanctioned swim meet to determine the team and individual national champions of Division I women's collegiate swimming and diving in the United States.

This year's events were hosted at the Indiana University Natatorium in Indianapolis, Indiana.

Georgia, runners up at the two previous championships, topped this year's team standings, finishing 84 points ahead of two-time defending champions California. This was the Lady Bulldogs' fifth women's team title.

== Team standings ==
- Note: Top 10 only
- ^{(DC)} = Defending champions
- Full results

Rank	Team	Points
1st place, gold medalist(s)	Georgia	477
2nd place, silver medalist(s)	California ^{(DC)}	393
3rd place, bronze medalist(s)	Tennessee	325 1/2
4	Texas A&M	323 1/2
5	Arizona	311
6	Florida	305
7	USC	291
8	Stanford	246
9	Texas	186
10	Minnesota	141

== Swimming results ==
Event	Gold		Silver		Bronze	
50 freestyle	Margo Geer; Arizona	21.73	Megan Romano; Georgia	21.88	Faith Johnson; Tennessee	21.89
100 freestyle	Margo Geer; Arizona	47.19	Megan Romano; Georgia	47.47	Natalie Hinds; Florida	47.73
200 freestyle	Allison Schmitt; Georgia	1:41.85	Elizabeth Pelton; California	1:42.13	Megan Romano; Georgia	1:42.64
500 freestyle	Haley Anderson; USC	4:34.66	Amber McDermott; Georgia	4:34.86	Shannon Vreeland; Georgia	4:35.95
1650 freestyle	Haley Anderson; USC	15:45.98	Sarah Henry; Texas A&M	15:46.41	Lindsay Vrooman; Indiana	15:50.73
100 backstroke	Rachel Bootsma; California	50.13	Sinead Russell; Florida	51.46	Brooke Snodgrass; Indiana	51.52
200 backstroke	Elizabeth Pelton; California	1:47.84; US, AR	Dominique Bouchard; Missouri	1:50.06	Elizabeth Beisel; Florida	1:51.17
100 breaststroke	Breeja Larson; Texas A&M	57.63; MR	Kasey Carlson; USC	58.36	Katie Meili; Columbia	59.14
200 breaststroke	Laura Sogar; Texas	2:05.41	Haley Spencer; Minnesota	2:06.15	Breeja Larson; Texas A&M	2:06.24
100 butterfly	Olivia Scott; Auburn	51.64	Rachel Bootsma; California	51.68	Ellese Zalewski; Florida	51.69
200 butterfly	Cammile Adams; Texas A&M	1:52.61	Lauren Harrington; Georgia	1:54.39	Carolyn Blalock; UNC	1:54.65
200 IM	Caitlin Leverenz; California	1:53.39	Elizabeth Pelton; California	1:53.82	Maya DiRado; Stanford	1:53.86
400 IM	Elizabeth Beisel; Florida	4:00.49	Maya DiRado; Stanford	4:01.02	Caitlin Leverenz; California	4:02.98
200 freestyle relay	Tennessee; Caroline Simmons (22.11); Faith Johnson (21.73); Lindsay Gendron (21.82); Kelsey Floyd (21.48)	1:27.14	Georgia; Madeline Locus (22.70); Chantal Van Landeghem (21.67); Jessica Graber (21.93); Megan Romano (21.08)	1:27.38	Arizona; Margo Geer (21.71); Kaitlyn Flederbach (21.79); Megan Lafferty (21.53); Alana Pazevic (22.48)	1:27.51
400 freestyle relay	Georgia; Shannon Vreeland (48.20); Chantal Van Landeghem (47.79); Allison Schmitt (47.16); Megan Romano (46.25)	3:09.40; US	Arizona; Megan Lafferty (48.30); Margo Geer (46.67); Kaitlyn Flederbach (48.24); Monica Drake (47.42)	3:10.63; AR	California; Elizabeth Pelton (47.78); Kaylin Bing (48.35); Rachael Acker (47.74); Rachel Bootsma (47.71)	3:11.58
800 freestyle relay	Georgia; Shannon Vreeland (1:44.13); Megan Romano (1:43.00); Brittany MacLean (1:44.27); Allison Schmitt (1:43.03)	6:54.43	Arizona; Bonnie Brandon (1:44.79); Margo Geer (1:43.01); Grace Finnegan (1:45.40); Monica Drake (1:44.06)	6:57.26	California; Rachael Acker (1:45.54); Caroline Piehl (1:45.41); Catherine Breed (1:44.33); Elizabeth Pelton (1:42.16)	6:57.44
200 medley relay	Tennessee; Lauren Solernou (24.40); Molly Hannis (26.15); Kelsey Floyd (22.92); Faith Johnson (21.48)	1:34.95	California; Rachel Bootma (23.40); Caitlin Leverenz (26.97); Cindy Tran (23.15); Kaylin Bing (22.01)	1:35.53	Arizona; Lauren Smart (24.57); Ellyn Baumgardner (26.63); Megan Lafferty (23.29); Margo Geer (21.20)	1:35.69
400 medley relay	Tennessee; Lauren Solernou (52.88); Molly Hannis (57.38); Kelsey Floyd (50.98); Lindsay Gendron (47.37)	3:28.51	Arizona; Lauren Smart (52.39); Ellyn Baumgardner (56.16); Megan Lafferty (51.67); Margo Geer (46.61)	3:28.83	California; Cindy Tran (52.38); Caitlin Leverenz (58.06); Rachel Bootsma (51.27); Elizabeth Pelton (47.76)	3:29.43

Legend: US – U.S. Open record; MR – Meet record; AR – American record;

== Diving Results ==
Event	Gold		Silver		Bronze	
1 m diving	Samantha Pickens; Arizona	348.45	Maggie Keefer; Minnesota	338.20	Jodie McGroarty; Tennessee	335.75
3 m diving	Casey Matthews; Purdue	386.55	Hailey Casper; Arizona State	377.70	Kelly Hendricks; Eastern Michigan	356.05
Platform diving	Haley Ishimatsu; USC	396.75; MR	Tori Lamp; Tennessee	328.60	Amy Cozad; Indiana	325.20

Legend: MR – Meet record;

== See also ==
- List of college swimming and diving teams
