= 1989 NCAA Division I Women's Swimming and Diving Championships =

American college aquatic sports competition

- Host city: Indianapolis, Indiana
- Date(s): March 1989
- Venue(s): Indiana University Natatorium

The 1989 NCAA Women's Division I Swimming and Diving Championships were contested at the eighth annual NCAA-sanctioned swim meet to determine the team and individual national champions of Division I women's collegiate swimming and diving in the United States.

This year's events were hosted at the Indiana University Natatorium in Indianapolis, Indiana.

Stanford topped the team standings, finishing just 63.5 points ahead of five-time defending champions Texas; it was the Cardinal's second overall title and first since 1983.

== Team standings ==
- Note: Top 10 only
- ^{(DC)} = Defending champions
- Full results

Rank	Team	Points
1st place, gold medalist(s)	Stanford	610 1/2
2nd place, silver medalist(s)	Texas ^{(DC)}	547
3rd place, bronze medalist(s)	Florida	536
4	Tennessee	260 1/2
5	California	234
6	Michigan; UCLA	172
8	Arizona State	145
9	Clemson	142
10	Georgia	126

== See also ==
- List of college swimming and diving teams
