= Foschi =

Foschi is an Italian surname. Notable people with the name include:

- Francesco Foschi (1710–1780), Italian painter best known for painting winter landscapes
- Franco Foschi (1931-2007), Italian writer and politician
- J. P. Foschi (born 1982), American football player
- Jessica Foschi (born 1980), American competition swimmer
- Luciano Foschi (born 1967), Italian footballer
- Massimo Foschi (born 1938), Italian actor and voice actor, father of Marco
- Marco Foschi (born 1977), Italian film and television actor, son of Massimo
- Pier Francesco Foschi (1502–1567), Italian painter active in Florence
- Sigismondo Foschi (fl. 1520-1532), Italian painter of the Renaissance period
- Tiziana Foschi, (born 1964), Italian actress
