= 2001 NCAA Division I Women's Swimming and Diving Championships =

American college aquatic sports competition

- Host city: (New York (state)) East Meadow, New York
- Date: March 2001
- Venue: Nassau County Aquatic Center

The 2001 NCAA Women's Division I Swimming and Diving Championships were contested at the 20th annual NCAA-sanctioned swim meet to determine the team and individual national champions of Division I women's collegiate swimming and diving in the United States.

This year's events were hosted at the Nassau County Aquatic Center in East Meadow, Long Island, New York.

Two-time defending champions Georgia once again topped the team standings for the first time, finishing a mere 1 1/2 points ahead of Stanford. This was the Bulldogs' third women's team title.

== Team standings ==
- Note: Top 10 only
- ^{(DC)} = Defending champions
- Full results

Rank	Team	Points
1st place, gold medalist(s)	Georgia ^{(DC)}	389
2nd place, silver medalist(s)	Stanford	387 1/2
3rd place, bronze medalist(s)	Texas	350 1/2
4	Auburn	324
5	Arizona	304
6	USC	255
7	California	248
8	Florida	214
9	North Carolina	175
10	SMU	155 1/2

== Swimming results ==
Event	Gold		Silver		Bronze	
50 freestyle	Colleen Lanne; Texas	21.99	Haley Cope; California	22.34	Jennifer Cristy; Indiana	22.47
100 freestyle	Colleen Lanne; Texas	48.29	Maritza Correia; Georgia	48.49	Stefanie Williams; Georgia	48.75
200 freestyle	Sarah Tolar; Arizona	1:45.21	Colleen Lanne; Texas	1:45.27	Ellen Stonebraker; Wisconsin	1:45.88
500 freestyle	Jessica Foschi; Stanford	4:37.81	Janelle Atkinson; Florida	4:39.44	Cara Lane; Virginia	4:39.61
1650 freestyle	Cara Lane; Virginia	15:53.86	Jessica Foschi; Stanford	16:03.47	Janelle Atkinson; Florida	16:07.34
100 backstroke	Natalie Coughlin; California	51.23; US, AR	Misty Hyman; Stanford	53.04	Haley Cope; California	53.06
200 backstroke	Natalie Coughlin; California	1:51.02; US, AR	Beth Botsford; Arizona	1:55.65	Anu Koivisto; SMU	1:55.85
100 breaststroke	Tara Kirk; Stanford	59.18	Ashley Roby; Georgia	59.91	Kristen Woodring; Penn State	59.96
200 breaststroke	Amanda Beard; Arizona	2:09.09	Tara Kirk; Stanford	2:10.24	Anne Poleska; Alabama	2:10.99
100 butterfly	Natalie Coughlin; California	51.18	Misty Hyman; Stanford	51.51	Shona Kitson; Texas	53.34
200 butterfly	Misty Hyman; Stanford	1:53.63	Shelly Ripple; Stanford	1:54.95	Michala Kwasny; USC	1:55.08
200 IM	Maggie Bowen; Auburn	1:55.49; US, AR	Shelly Ripple; Stanford	1:56.24	Michala Kwasny; USC	1:57.60
400 IM	Maggie Bowen; Auburn	4:07.26	Michala Kwasny; USC	4:10.61	Jaime Ellis; Florida	4:11.36
200 freestyle relay	Texas; Colleen Lanne (22.09); Tanica Jamison (22.32); Kelley Robins (22.36); Erin Phenix (22.12)	1:28.89; US, AR	California; Michelle Harper (23.10); Natalie Coughlin (22.00); Adrienne Mattos (23.11); Haley Cope (21.84)	1:30.05	Auburn; Becky Short (23.10); Eileen Coparropa (22.29); Cassidy Maxwell (22.63); Cortnee Adams (22.29)	1:30.31
400 freestyle relay	Texas; Colleen Lanne (48.14); Tanica Jamison (49.86); Shona Kitson (48.54); Erin Phenix (47.98)	3:14.52; US, AR	Georgia; Stefanie Williams (49.32); Neka Mabry (49.68); Katie Parmenter (49.78); Maritza Correia (47.75)	3:16.53	Arizona; Jenny Vanker (49.71); Caroline Kilian (49.38); Sarah Tolar (48.52); Michelle Engelsman (49.65)	3:17.26
800 freestyle relay	Georgia; Stefanie Williams (1:46.64); Kim Black (1:47.50); Julie Hardt (1:46.48); Maritza Correia (1:45.86)	7:06.48	Stanford; Jessica Foschi (1:46.56); Misty Hyman (1:45.97); Shelly Ripple (1:46.01); Lauren Thies (1:49.10)	7:07.64	Auburn; Heather Kemp (1:49.04); Maggie Bowen (1:46.19); Cassidy Maxwell (1:47.15); Magda Dyszkiewicz (1:47.28)	7:09.66
200 medley relay	Stanford; Shelly Ripple (25.10); Tara Kirk (27.20); Misty Hyman (23.39); Siobhan Cropper (22.74)	1:38.43	California; Haley Cope (24.57); Staciana Stitts (28.15); Natalie Coughlin (23.34); Michelle Harper (22.38)	1:38.44; AR	Texas; Kelley Robins (25.58); Kelley Robins (27.67); Shona Kitson (23.75); Colleen Lanne (21.46)	1:38.46
400 medley relay	Stanford; Shelly Ripple (53.35); Tara Kirk (58.77); Misty Hyman (50.80); Siobhan Cropper (49.51)	3:32.43; US	California; Haley Cope (53.32); Staciana Stitts (1:00.51); Natalie Coughlin (51.09); Danielle Becks (49.91)	3:34.83; AR	Arizona; Beth Botsford (54.04); Amanda Beard (59.80); Erin Vogt (53.44); Sarah Tolar (47.93)	3:35.21

Legend: US – U.S. Open record; AR – American record;

== Diving results ==
Event	Gold		Silver		Bronze	
1 m diving	Yuliya Pakhalina; Houston	329.60	Katie Beth Bryant; USC	324.75	Jamie Sanger; Indiana	315.15
3 m diving	Yuliya Pakhalina; Houston	573.20	Jenny Keim; Miami	544.30	Nicci Fusaro; USC	537.85
Platform diving	Erin Sones; Stanford	463.05	Ashley Culpepper; LSU	453.45	Danielle Stramandi; Princeton	445.15

== See also ==
- List of college swimming and diving teams
