= 1995 NCAA Division I Women's Swimming and Diving Championships =

American college aquatic sports competition

- Host city: Austin, Texas
- Date(s): March 1995
- Venue(s): Texas Swimming Center; University of Texas

The 1995 NCAA Women's Division I Swimming and Diving Championships were contested at the 14th annual NCAA-sanctioned swim meet to determine the team and individual national champions of Division I women's collegiate swimming and diving in the United States.

This year's events were hosted by the University of Texas at the Texas Swimming Center in Austin, Texas.

Stanford once again topped the team standings, finishing 19 points ahead of Michigan. It was the Cardinal's fourth consecutive and seventh overall women's team title.

== Team standings ==
- Note: Top 10 only
- (H) = Hosts
- ^{(DC)} = Defending champions
- Full results

Rank	Team	Points
1st place, gold medalist(s)	Stanford ^{(DC)}	497 1/2
2nd place, silver medalist(s)	Michigan	478 1/2
3rd place, bronze medalist(s)	Texas (H)	355
4	SMU	306 1/2
5	Arizona	250
6	Georgia	247
7	USC	208
8	Florida	191
9	Nebraska	170
10	UCLA	148

== See also ==
- List of college swimming and diving teams
