= Hecking =

Hecking is a German language surname. Notable people with the name include:

- Dieter Hecking (1964), German football manager
- Kelly Hecking (1980), American former backstroke and freestyle competition swimmer
