= 1992 NCAA Division I Women's Swimming and Diving Championships =

American college aquatic sports competition

- Host city: Austin, Texas
- Date(s): March 1992
- Venue(s): Texas Swimming Center; University of Texas

The 1992 NCAA Women's Division I Swimming and Diving Championships were contested at the 11th annual NCAA-sanctioned swim meet to determine the team and individual national champions of Division I women's collegiate swimming and diving in the United States.

This year's events were hosted by the University of Texas at the Texas Swimming Center in Austin, Texas.

Stanford upset hosts and two-time defending champions Texas to claim the team title, the Cardinal's third.

== Team standings ==
- Note: Top 10 only
- (H) = Hosts
- ^{(DC)} = Defending champions
- Full results

Rank	Team	Points
1st place, gold medalist(s)	Stanford	735 1/2
2nd place, silver medalist(s)	Texas (H) ^{(DC)}	651
3rd place, bronze medalist(s)	Florida	294 1/2
4	SMU	285
5	Arizona	272
6	UCLA	206 1/2
7	Michigan	188
8	Auburn	154
9	Georgia	130
10	Minnesota	117 1/2

== See also ==
- List of college swimming and diving teams
