= 2010 NCAA Division I Women's Swimming and Diving Championships =

American college aquatic sports competition

- Host city: West Lafayette, Indiana
- Date: March 2010
- Venue(s): Boilermaker Aquatic Center; Purdue University

The 2010 NCAA Women's Division I Swimming and Diving Championships were contested at the 29th annual NCAA-sanctioned swim meet to determine the team and individual national champions of Division I women's collegiate swimming and diving in the United States.

This year's events were hosted by Purdue University at the Boilermaker Aquatic Center in West Lafayette, Indiana.

For the first time since 1982, Florida topped the team standings, finishing a mere 2.5 points (382–379.5) ahead of Stanford. This was the Gators' second women's team title.

== Team standings ==
- Note: Top 10 only
- (H) = Hosts
- ^{(DC)} = Defending champions
- Full results

Rank	Team	Points
1st place, gold medalist(s)	Florida	382
2nd place, silver medalist(s)	Stanford	379 1/2
3rd place, bronze medalist(s)	California ^{(DC)}	363
4	Arizona	359 1/2
5	Georgia	342 1/2
6	Texas A&M	311
7	USC	251
8	Auburn	153
9	Virginia	151
10	Indiana	133
16	Purdue (H)	57

== Swimming results ==
Event	Gold		Silver		Bronze	
50 freestyle	Liv Jensen; California	22.04	Elizabeth Webb; Stanford	22.07	Anne-Marie Botek; Georgia	22.14
100 freestyle	Julia Wilkinson; Texas A&M	47.61	Morgan Scroggy; Georgia	47.72	Liv Jensen; California	47.77
200 freestyle	Allison Schmitt; Georgia	1:42.84	Morgan Scroggy; Georgia	1:42.94	Julia Wilkinson; Texas A&M	1:44.12
500 freestyle	Allison Schmitt; Georgia	4:34.13	Lauren Boyle; California	4:37.18	Wendy Trott; Georgia	4:37.50
1650 freestyle	Wendy Trott; Georgia	15:48.87	Alicia Aemisegger; Princeton	15:57.02	Lauren Boyle; California	15:59.57
100 backstroke	Gemma Spofforth; Florida	51.30	Kateryna Fesenko; Indiana	51.51	Presley Bard; USC	51.89
200 backstroke	Kateryna Fesenko; Indiana	1:49.92	Gemma Spofforth; Florida	1:50.24	Teresa Crippen; Florida	1:50.99
100 breaststroke	Ann Chandler; Arizona	58.06; NC	Ashley Danner; George Mason	59.29	Ellyn Baumgardner; Arizona	59.44
200 breaststroke	Alia Atkinson; Texas A&M	2:07.38	Elizabeth Smith; Stanford	2:07.50	Ann Chandler; Arizona	2:07.68
100 butterfly	Elaine Breeden; Stanford	51.43	Lyndsay DePaul; USC	51.72	Amanda Sims; California	51.85
200 butterfly	Elaine Breeden; Stanford	1:52.39	Katinka Hosszú; USC	1:52.52	Lyndsay DePaul; USC	1:53.19
200 IM	Julia Smit; Stanford	1:53.56	Julia Wilkinson; Texas A&M	1:54.45	Morgan Scroggy; Georgia	1:54.62
400 IM	Julia Smit; Stanford	4:00.90	Teresa Crippen; Florida	4:02.91	Katinka Hosszú; USC	4:03.65
200 freestyle relay	Florida; Shara Stafford (22.29); Gemma Spofforth (21.46); Stephanie Napier (22.18); Sarah Bateman (21.86)	1:27.79	Stanford; Elizabeth Webb (22.13); Samantha Woodward (22.34); Kate Dwelley (22.14); Julia Smit (21.77)	1:28.38	California; Hannah Wilson (22.53); Colleen Fotsch (22.50); Erica Dagg (22.29); Liv Jensen (21.65)	1:28.97
400 freestyle relay	Stanford; Kate Dwelley (48.32); Samantha Woodward (48.36); Elizabeth Webb (48.04); Julia Smit (47.60)	3:12.32	California; Hannah Wilson (48.35); Sara Isaković (48.51); Erica Dagg (48.40); Liv Jensen (47.41)	3:12.67	Florida; Elizabeth Kemp (49.18); Shara Stafford (47.50); Gemma Spofforth (47.76); Jamie Bohunicky (48.99)	3:13.43
800 freestyle relay	Georgia; Morgan Scroggy (1:43.63); Megan Romano (1:44.20); Chelsea Nauta (1:44.68); Allison Schmitt (1:43.10)	7:00.00	California; Hannah Wilson (1:45.87); Sara Isaković (1:44.61); Lauren Boyle (1:45.13); Liv Jensen (1:44.39)	7:01.53	Florida; Shara Stafford (1:45.03); Jamie Bohunicky (1:45.75); Teresa Crippen (1:44.80); Melani Costa (1:45.95)	7:02.55
200 medley relay	Arizona; Ana Agy (24.39); Ann Chandler (26.30); Erin Campbell (23.38); Justine Schluntz (21.68)	1:35.75	Tennessee; Jenny Connolly (24.41); Alex Barsanti (27.28); Kelsey Floyd (23.77); Michele King (21.44)	1:36.90	Florida; Gemma Spofforth (23.92); Lindsay Rogers (27.82); Jemma Lowe (23.47); Sarah Bateman (21.80)	1:37.01
400 medley relay	Arizona; Ana Agy (51.81); Ann Chandler (58.32); Whitney Lopus (52.21); Justine Schluntz (47.42)	3:29.76	Stanford; Elizabeth Webb (52.39); Julia Smit (59.04); Elaine Breeden (51.01); Kate Dwelley (48.01)	3:30.45	Florida; Gemma Spofforth (50.84); Lindsay Rogers (1:01.38); Jemma Lowe (51.66); Shara Stafford (47.81)	3:31.69

Legend: NC – NCAA record;

== Diving Results ==
Event	Gold		Silver		Bronze	
1 m diving	Anastasia Pozdniakova; Houston	356.20	Kelci Bryant; Minnesota	352.65	Jaele Patrick; Texas A&M	340.60
3 m diving	Kelci Bryant; Minnesota	415.50	Anastasia Pozdniakova; Houston	406.45	Jaele Patrick; Texas A&M	381.75
Platform diving	Chen Ni; Purdue	325.50	Carrie Dragland; Alabama	323.05	Kara Salamone; Florida	307.45

== See also ==
- List of college swimming and diving teams
