= 1993 NCAA Division I Women's Swimming and Diving Championships =

American college aquatic sports competition

- Host city: Minneapolis, Minnesota
- Date(s): March 1993
- Venue(s): University Aquatic Center; University of Minnesota

The 1993 NCAA Women's Division I Swimming and Diving Championships were contested at the 12th annual NCAA-sanctioned swim meet to determine the team and individual national champions of Division I women's collegiate swimming and diving in the United States.

This year's events were hosted at the University Aquatic Center at the University of Minnesota in Minneapolis, Minnesota.

Stanford repeated as team champions, finishing 228.5 points ahead of Florida in the point standings. It was the Cardinal's second consecutive and fourth overall team title.

== Team standings ==
- Note: Top 10 only
- (H) = Hosts
- ^{(DC)} = Defending champions
- Full results

Rank	Team	Points
1st place, gold medalist(s)	Stanford ^{(DC)}	649 1/2
2nd place, silver medalist(s)	Florida	421
3rd place, bronze medalist(s)	Texas	407
4	SMU	273
5	Michigan	251
6	Arizona	250
7	UCLA	240
8	Auburn	174
9	Arizona State	132
10	Alabama	130
21	Minnesota (H)	39

== See also ==
- List of college swimming and diving teams
