= Swimming at the 2011 Pan American Games – Women's 50 metre freestyle =

Women's 50 metre freestyle at the 2011 Pan American Games
- Venue: Scotiabank Aquatics Center
- Dates: October 21 (preliminaries and finals)
- Competitors: 19 from 14 nations

Medalists
Gold medal	Lara Jackson	United States
Silver medal	Graciele Herrmann	Brazil
Bronze medal	Madison Kennedy	United States

The women's 50 metre freestyle competition of the swimming events at the 2011 Pan American Games took place on October 21 at the Scotiabank Aquatics Center in the municipality of Zapopan, near Guadalajara, Mexico. The defending Pan American Games champion is Arlene Semeco of Venezuela.

This race consisted of one length of the pool in freestyle.

== Records ==
Prior to this competition, the existing world and Pan American Games records were as follows:

World record	Britta Steffen (GER)	23.73	Rome, Italy	August 2, 2009
Pan American Games record	Arlene Semeco (VEN)	25.14	Rio de Janeiro, Brazil	July 18, 2007

== Qualification ==
Each National Olympic Committee (NOC) was able to enter up to two entrants providing they had met the A standard (26.4) in the qualifying period (January 1, 2010 to September 4, 2011). NOCs were also permitted to enter one athlete providing they had met the B standard (27.2) in the same qualifying period.

== Results ==
All times are in minutes and seconds.

KEY:	q	Fastest non-qualifiers	Q	Qualified	GR	Games record	NR	National record	PB	Personal best	SB	Seasonal best

=== Heats ===
The first round was held on October 21.

Rank	Heat	Lane	Name	Nationality	Time	Notes
1	1	5	Graciele Herrmann	Brazil	25.28	QA
2	3	4	Lara Jackson	United States	25.39	QA
3	2	4	Madison Kennedy	United States	25.40	QA
4	3	5	Arlene Semeco	Venezuela	25.58	QA
5	1	4	Vanessa García	Puerto Rico	25.64	QA
6	2	5	Flavia Delaroli-Cazziolato	Brazil	25.77	QA
7	1	6	Nadia Colovini	Argentina	26.04	QA, NR
8	3	3	Jennifer Beckberger	Canada	26.05	QA
9	3	2	Liliana Ibáñez	Mexico	26.34	QB
10	3	6	Carolina Colorado Henao	Colombia	26.64	QB
11	2	3	Caroline Lapierre	Canada	26.66	QB
12	1	2	Ariel Weech	Bahamas	26.76	QB
13	2	6	Ximena Vilar	Venezuela	26.84	QB
14	1	3	Chinyere Pigot	Suriname	26.89	QB
15	3	7	Allyson Ponson	Aruba	27.16	QB
16	2	7	Karen Torrez	Bolivia	27.24	QB
17	1	7	Kiera Aitken	Bermuda	27.27	
18	2	2	Debra Rodriguez	Puerto Rico	27.28	
19	3	1	Karin O'Reilly	Netherlands Antilles	31.41	

=== B Final ===
The B final was also held on October 21.

Rank	Lane	Name	Nationality	Time	Notes
9	4	Liliana Ibáñez	Mexico	26.17	
10	6	Ariel Weech	Bahamas	26.49	
11	3	Caroline Lapierre	Canada	26.53	
12	5	Carolina Colorado Henao	Colombia	26.65	
13	2	Ximena Vilar	Venezuela	26.80	
14	1	Allyson Ponson	Aruba	26.93	
15	8	Karen Torrez	Bolivia	27.03	
16	7	Chinyere Pigot	Suriname	27.32	

=== A Final ===
The A final was also held on October 21.

Rank	Lane	Name	Nationality	Time	Notes
1st place, gold medalist(s)	5	Lara Jackson	United States	25.09	GR
2nd place, silver medalist(s)	4	Graciele Herrmann	Brazil	25.23	
3rd place, bronze medalist(s)	3	Madison Kennedy	United States	25.24	
4	2	Vanessa García	Puerto Rico	25.39	
5	6	Arlene Semeco	Venezuela	25.57	
6	7	Flavia Delaroli-Cazziolato	Brazil	25.94	
7	1	Nadia Colovini	Argentina	26.08	
8	8	Jennifer Beckberger	Canada	26.12	
