= Lauren English =

American swimmer

Personal information
- Full name: Lauren Anne English
- National team: United States
- Born: April 22, 1989 (age 37) Glen Ridge, New Jersey, U.S.

Sport
- Sport: Swimming
- Strokes: Backstroke
- College team: University of Georgia
Medal record
Representing United States
Summer Universiade
Silver medal – second place	2007 Bangkok	4x100m medley relay

Lauren Anne English (born April 22, 1989) is an American swimmer who represented the United States at the Pan Pacific Championships (2006), the World University Games (2007) and the Junior Pan Pacific Games (2005). English was born in Glen Ridge, New Jersey and resides in Lincoln Park, New Jersey. She set the United States Open Record in the 50 Meter Backstroke. She swam collegiately for the University of Georgia. Upon her retirement from higher level swimming she enrolled at New York University in nursing and later received a master's degree as an advanced practice nurse from Seton Hall University. She is now a Director of Patient Care at Columbia Presbyterian Hospital in New York City.

== High school ==
Growing up in Montville, New Jersey, she attended Montville Township High School and was a four-time state champion in the 100 yard Backstroke, where she holds the state record. She was also state champion and held the New Jersey record in the 50 yard freestyle. She also surpassed Kelly Hecking's 55.64 100 yard backstroke New Jersey record with a 55.57 in 2005. She set the 100 meter (short course) backstroke national public high school record surpassing Tashy Bohm. English was New Jersey Swimmer of the year twice and was named high school swimmer of the year by the National High School Coaches Association in 2007. She was a nine-time High School All American and a multiple Academic All American. In addition to swimming for her high school team, she swam for the Cougar Aquatic Club.

At the turn of the decade, she was named one of the ten most outstanding female high school athletes in New Jersey of the past ten years. In 2017 Lauren was inducted into the Montville High School Hall of Fame.

== College ==
At the University of Georgia she swam on their nationally ranked swim team under coach Jack Bauerle. As a Freshman, though she reached the finals of the SEC Championships, made the all Freshman SEC team in two events, and made NCAA cuts she labored the entire year under a serious shoulder injury and was unable to compete at the NCAA's. However, as a result of her academic and athletic performances she was named an Academic All American. She did not compete in her sophomore year while rehabbing from an operation to correct the shoulder injury. She was a member of the University of Georgia team which won the SEC Championships in 2010 and which was the runner - up in the NCAA Championships, her junior year. She was co-captain of the 2011-2012 team.

== National competitions ==
English came in ninth in the 2004 Olympic Trials in the 100 Backstroke at the age of 15. In 2005 she gained a Silver at the U.S. Open. In 2006 she won a Bronze at the Spring Championships and got a Silver in the 100 Backstroke at the Summer Nationals. She broke the US Open Record for the 50 Backstroke in 2007 at the Toyota Grand Prix at the University of Missouri, winning a Gold in the event. As of 2016, she still held the YMCA long course 50 backstroke record she set in 2004. In National competitions she swam for the Cougar Aquatic Club in Montclair, New Jersey under Coach Kit Ashenfelter.

== International competitions ==
She won a Silver in the 100 backstroke, a bronze in the 200 backstroke, and a Bronze in the 400 Medley Relay at the 2005 Junior Pan Pacific Meet. She was a member of USA's Pan Pacific team and was a finalist in the 100 backstroke at the 2006 Pan Pacific Meet. At the World University Games in 2007 she helped the United States team to a Silver in the 400 Medley Relay (pr) and was a finalist in the 50 Back.

== Post-retirement ==
She went on to fight the COVID-19 pandemic in the United States as a neurology nurse at Columbia University Irving Medical Center.
