= 1982 NCAA Division I Women's Swimming and Diving Championships =

American college aquatic sports competition

- Host city: Gainesville, Florida
- Date(s): March 1982
- Venue(s): O'Connell Center

The 1982 NCAA Women's Division I Swimming and Diving Championships were the first annual NCAA-sanctioned swim meet to determine the team and individual national champions of Division I women's collegiate swimming and diving in the United States. The inaugural event was hosted at the O'Connell Center at the University of Florida in Gainesville, Florida. The men's and women's titles would not be held at the same site until 2006.

Hosts Florida topped the team standings and took home the inaugural NCAA women's team title.

== Team standings ==
- Note: Top 10 only
- (H) = Hosts
- Full results

Rank	Team	Points
1st place, gold medalist(s)	Florida (H)	505
2nd place, silver medalist(s)	Stanford	383
3rd place, bronze medalist(s)	North Carolina	285
4	Auburn	253
5	USC	199
6	Arizona	179
7	Arizona State	166
8	NC State	123
9	Alabama	115
10	Tennessee	100

== Individual events ==
=== Swimming events ===
Event	Gold	Silver	Bronze
50 yard freestyle			
100 yard freestyle			
200 yard freestyle			
500 yard freestyle			
1,650 yard freestyle			
50 yard backstroke			
100 yard backstroke			
200 yard backstroke			
50 yard breaststroke			
100 yard breaststroke			
200 yard breaststroke			
50 yard butterfly			
100 yard butterfly			
200 yard butterfly			
100 yard IM			
200 yard IM			
400 yard IM			

=== Diving events ===
Event	Gold	Silver	Bronze
One-meter diving			
Three-meter diving			

== See also ==
- List of college swimming and diving teams
