= 1999 NCAA Division I Women's Swimming and Diving Championships =

American college aquatic sports competition

- Host city: (Georgia (U.S. state)) Athens, Georgia
- Date: March 1999
- Venue(s): Gabrielsen Natatorium; University of Georgia

The 1999 NCAA Women's Division I Swimming and Diving Championships were contested at the 18th annual NCAA-sanctioned swim meet to determine the team and individual national champions of Division I women's collegiate swimming and diving in the United States.

This year's events were hosted at Gabrielsen Natatorium at the University of Georgia in Athens, Georgia.

Hosts Georgia topped the team standings for the first time, finishing 63.5 points ahead of defending champion Stanford, and claimed the Bulldogs' first women's team title.

== Team standings ==
- Note: Top 10 only
- (H) = Hosts
- ^{(DC)} = Defending champions
- Full results

Rank	Team	Points
1st place, gold medalist(s)	Georgia (H)	504 1/2
2nd place, silver medalist(s)	Stanford ^{(DC)}	441
3rd place, bronze medalist(s)	SMU	370 1/2
4	Arizona	332
5	California	315
6	USC	245
7	Michigan	163
8	Florida	147
9	Northwestern	145
10	Virginia	140

== Swimming results ==
Event	Gold		Silver		Bronze	
50 freestyle	Catherine Fox; Texas	22.13	Courtney Allen; Northwestern	22.47	Karen Campbell; USC	22.52
100 freestyle	Martina Moravcová; SMU	48.05	Courtney Shealy; Georgia	48.49	Rania Elwani; SMU	48.58
200 freestyle	Martina Moravcová; SMU	1:43.84	Sarah Tolar; Arizona	1:45.71	Lindsay Benko; USC	1:46.31
500 freestyle	Lindsay Benko; USC	4:40.22	Ellen Stonebraker; Wisconsin	4:41.26	Trina Jackson; Arizona	4:42.88
1650 freestyle	Julie Varozza; Georgia	15:59.66	Rachel Komisarz; Kentucky	16:04.42	Ellen Stonebraker; Wisconsin	16:13.08
100 backstroke	Marylyn Chiang; California	52.36; US	Catherine Fox; Stanford	52.77	Courtney Shealy; Georgia	52.97
200 backstroke	Keegan Walkley; Georgia	1:53.63	Misty Hyman; Stanford	1:54.10	Lindsay Benko; USC	1:55.71
100 breaststroke	Kristy Kowal; Georgia	59.25	Danica Wizniuk; Virginia	1:00.45	Kristin MacGregor; USC	1:00.67
200 breaststroke	Kristy Kowal; Georgia	2:07.66; US, AR	Elin Austevoll; Stanford	2:09.99	Maddy Crippen; Villanova	2:11.66
100 butterfly	Misty Hyman; Stanford	51.77	Liu Limin; Nevada	51.96	Marylyn Chiang; California	52.40
200 butterfly	Liu Limin; Nevada	1:53.36; US	Misty Hyman; Stanford	1:53.60	Karen Campbell; USC	1:57.43
200 IM	Martina Moravcová; SMU	1:55.64	Marylyn Chiang; California	1:57.83	Kristy Kowal; Georgia	1:58.14
400 IM	Maddy Crippen; Villanova	4:06.76	Keegan Walkley; Georgia	4:07.06	Jennifer Hommert; Florida	4:10.80
200 freestyle relay	SMU; Martina Moravcová (22.22); Rania Elwani (22.24); Alison Wimer (22.40); Katina Maistrellis (22.08)	1:28.94	Stanford; Siobhan Cropper (23.11); Misty Hyman (22.52); Gabrielle Rose (22.65); Catherine Fox (22.01)	1:30.29	Michigan; Jennie Eberwein (22.91); Jen Crisman (22.15); Missy Sugar (23.10); Shannon Shakespeare (22.39)	1:30.55
400 freestyle relay	Arizona; Lindsey Farella (49.36); Trina Jackson (49.57); Emily Mastin (49.14); Sarah Tolar (48.42)	3:16.49	California; Marylyn Chiang (49.85); Haley Cope (49.16); Anya Kolbisen (49.13); Joscelin Yeo (48.42)	3:16.56	Michigan; Jennie Eberwein (49.42); Jen Crisman (49.61); Missy Sugar (49.29); Shannon Shakespeare (48.26)	3:16.58
800 freestyle relay	Stanford; Misty Hyman (1:45.40); Gabrielle Rose (1:46.47); Sylvia Bereknyei (1:47.33); Catherine Fox (1:47.02)	7:06.22	Arizona; Trina Jackson (1:47.72); Lindsey Farella (1:48.20); Emily Mastin (1:46.90); Sarah Tolar (1:46.37)	7:09.19	SMU; Naoko Imoto (1:47.42); Katherine Inskeep (1:48.79); Elizabeth Myers (1:49.12); Martina Moravcová (1:44.77)	7:10.10
200 medley relay	Stanford; Shelly Ripple (25.00); Whitney Leatherwood (27.57); Misty Hyman (23.08); Gabrielle Rose (22.12)	1:37.77; US	Georgia; Courtney Shealy (25.05); Kristy Kowal (27.00); Beth Timmons (24.42); Stefanie Williams (22.19)	1:38.66	California; Haley Cope (25.01); Joscelin Yeo (28.12); Marylyn Chiang (24.22); Adrienne Mattos (22.41)	1:39.76
400 medley relay	Stanford; Shelly Ripple (53.35); Elin Austevoll (59.91); Misty Hyman (52.15); Catherine Fox (48.34)	3:33.75	SMU; Lia Oberstar (54.93); Katie McClelland (1:00.37); Martina Moravcová (51.76); Rania Elwani (48.76)	3:35.42	Georgia; Amanda Adkins (54.32); Kristy Kowal (59.11); Beth Timmons (54.01); Courtney Shealy (48.18)	3:35.62

Legend: US – U.S. Open record; AR – American record;

== Diving results ==
Event	Gold		Silver		Bronze	
1 m diving	Jenny Lingamfelter; SMU	444.40	Lang Rao; Nevada	439.05	Jenny Keim; Miami	435.60
3 m diving	Yuliya Pakhalina; Houston	573.20	Jenny Keim; Miami	544.30	Nicci Fusaro; USC	537.85
Platform diving	Laura Wilkinson; Texas	664.75	Jenny Keim; Miami	635.10	Natalia Diea; Texas	619.50

== See also ==
- List of college swimming and diving teams
