= 1983 NCAA Division I Women's Swimming and Diving Championships =

American college aquatic sports competition

- Host city: Lincoln, Nebraska
- Date(s): March 1983
- Venue(s): Bob Devaney Sports Center

The 1983 NCAA Women's Division I Swimming and Diving Championships were contested at the second annual NCAA-sanctioned swim meet to determine the team and individual national champions of Division I women's collegiate swimming and diving in the United States. This year's event was hosted at the Bob Devaney Sports Center at the University of Nebraska–Lincoln in Lincoln, Nebraska. The men's and women's titles would not be held at the same site until 2006.

Stanford topped defending champions Florida by 29 points in the team standings, capturing the Cardinal's first team title.

== Team standings ==
- Note: Top 10 only
- (H) = Hosts
- ^{(DC)} = Defending champions
- Full results

Rank	Team	Points
1st place, gold medalist(s)	Stanford	418 1/2
2nd place, silver medalist(s)	Florida ^{(DC)}	389 1/2
3rd place, bronze medalist(s)	Texas	314
4	USC	223
5	Alabama	185
6	North Carolina	180
7	Kansas	148
8	Auburn	131
9	Southern Illinois	123
10	Ohio State	89

== See also ==
- List of college swimming and diving teams
