= J. P. Foschi =

American football player (born 1982)

John Paul Foschi
No. 49, 84, 88
- Position: Tight end

Personal information
- Born: May 19, 1982 (age 44); Queens, New York, U.S.
- Listed height: 6 ft 3 in (1.91 m)
- Listed weight: 265 lb (120 kg)

Career information
- High school: Chaminade (Mineola, New York)
- College: Georgia Tech
- NFL draft: 2004: undrafted

Career history
- New York Jets (2004)*; Denver Broncos (2004)*; Minnesota Vikings (2004)*; Oakland Raiders (2004–2006); Kansas City Chiefs (2008); Oakland Raiders (2009)*; Cincinnati Bengals (2009); Buffalo Bills (2010)*; Cincinnati Bengals (2010)
- * Offseason or practice squad member only

Career NFL statistics
- Receptions: 33
- Receiving yards: 297
- Receiving touchdowns: 2
- Stats at Pro Football Reference

John Paul Marino "J. P." Foschi (pronounced Fos-ki) (born May 19, 1982) is an American former professional football player who was a tight end in the National Football League (NFL). He played college football for the Georgia Tech Yellow Jackets.

Foschi was signed by the New York Jets as an undrafted free agent in 2004. He was also a member of the Denver Broncos, Minnesota Vikings, Oakland Raiders, Kansas City Chiefs, Cincinnati Bengals, and Buffalo Bills.

== Early life ==
Foschi is from Long Island, New York. He attended Friends Academy Middle School in Locust Valley, NY and Chaminade High School. in Mineola, New York and was a four-year letterman in football and basketball.

== Professional career ==
Pre-draft measurables
Height	Weight	Arm length	Hand span	40-yard dash	10-yard split	20-yard split	20-yard shuttle	Three-cone drill	Vertical jump	Broad jump	Bench press
6 ft 3 7/8 in (1.93 m)	266 lb (121 kg)	33 1/4 in (0.84 m)	10 1/8 in (0.26 m)	5.03 s	1.78 s	2.94 s	4.35 s	7.49 s	30.5 in (0.77 m)	9 ft 3 in (2.82 m)	24 reps
All values from NFL Combine

== Personal life ==
John Paul is the son of Margaret and Robert Foschi. His father graduated from Columbia University in 1976 where he played basketball and studied engineering. J. P. has two sisters who were Division I college swimmers, one of whom is Jessica Foschi.
