= Jenna Gresdal =

Canadian swimmer (born 1984)

Personal information
- Full name: Jenna Marie Gresdal
- National team: Canada
- Born: September 19, 1984 (age 41) Terrace Bay, Ontario
- Height: 1.70 m (5 ft 7 in)
- Weight: 56 kg (123 lb)

Sport
- Sport: Swimming
- Strokes: Freestyle
- Club: Etobicoke Swim Club
- College team: University of Arizona (U.S.)

Jenna Marie Gresdal (born September 19, 1984) is a Canadian former competitive swimmer who specialized in sprint freestyle events. She became one of the youngest athletes (aged 15) to be selected for the Canadian team at the 2000 Summer Olympics. While studying in the United States, she earned six All-American honors for the University of Arizona at the NCAA Championships.

Gresdal started swimming at the age of 7, and later trained for Kevin Thorburn at the Etobicoke Swim Club in Toronto. After graduating from high school at Silverthorn Collegiate Institute, Gresdal received an athletic scholarship to attend the University of Arizona in Tucson, Arizona, where she majored in education and swam for the Arizona Wildcats swimming and diving team under head coach Frank Busch. While swimming for the Wildcats, she received six All-American honors for the team relays at the NCAA Women's Swimming and Diving Championships, and also set team records in the 50-yard freestyle (23.23) at the Pac-12 Conference championships.

Gresdal also competed in the women's 50-metre freestyle, as a 15-year-old, at the 2000 Summer Olympics in Sydney. She achieved a FINA A-standard of 25.93 from the Canadian Olympic Trials in Winnipeg, Manitoba. She challenged seven other swimmers in heat ten, including Dutch rising star Inge de Bruijn and defending Olympic champion Amy Van Dyken. She rounded out the field to last place in 26.79, just 2.33 seconds off an Olympic record, set by De Bruijn. Gresdal failed to advance into the semifinals, as she placed thirty-eighth overall out of 74 swimmers in the prelims.
