= Nancilea Foster =

American diver

Personal information
- Full name: Nancilea Marie Underwood-Foster
- Born: September 14, 1983 (age 42) Conroe, Texas, U.S.
- Home town: The Woodlands, Texas, U.S.
- Height: 5 ft 7 in (1.70 m)
- Weight: 134 lb (61 kg)

Sport
- Country: United States
- Sport: Diving
- Event: Springboard
- Club: Woodlands Diving Academy
- Team: Iowa Hawkeyes
- Partner: Cassidy Krug
- Coached by: Ken Armstrong

Nancilea Marie Foster (née Underwood, born September 14, 1983, in Conroe, Texas) is an American diver, who specialized in springboard events. She is a four-time national diving champion in the individual and synchronized springboard events (along with her partner Cassidy Krug). She also won a bronze medal for the same category at the second meet of the 2007 FINA Diving World Series in Mexico City, Mexico.

== Diving career ==
Foster started out her sporting career as a gymnast at age five, until she was encouraged by her mother to take up diving. She later became a member of the diving team at the Woodlands Diving Academy in The Woodlands, Texas, where she worked and trained under head coach Ken Armstrong. At age fourteen, Foster's worst fear as a diver came true, when her head slammed against the springboard, while flipping and twisting with a reverse two and a half somersault. Despite a sudden accident, Foster decided to progress her training through high school, until she was admitted to the University of Iowa and subsequently dove for the Iowa Hawkeyes Diving and Swimming Team.

While attending the University, Foster became the lone five-time all-American in the school's swimming and diving history. She placed second on the springboard at the 2005 NCAA Championships, and followed it up with a fourth-place finish by the following year. Foster also opted to take the Olympic redshirt during the 2003–2004 season, but missed out of her bid for the 2004 Summer Olympics in Athens, when she placed fourth in the trials. In 2006, she graduated from the University of Iowa with a bachelor's degree in international studies.

Foster made her international debut at the 2005 FINA World Diving Championships in Montreal, Quebec, Canada, where she placed ninth in the women's 3 m springboard event. She also claimed five gold medals at the Speedo USA Diving Spring National Diving Championships, including four from the individual and synchronized springboard (along with her partner Cassidy Krug). In 2007, Foster reached her breakthrough in diving, when she won the silver medal for her category at the Kaiser Permanente National Diving Championships in Stanford, California, and bronze at the second meet of the FINA Diving World Series in Mexico City, Mexico. She eventually followed her success with a sixth-place finish, and posted a score of 312.70 in the women's springboard at the FINA World Diving Championships in Melbourne, Australia.

Foster qualified for the women's springboard at the 2008 Summer Olympics in Beijing, by placing second from the U.S. Olympic Diving Team Trials in Indianapolis, Indiana. She was ranked eleventh out of thirty divers in the preliminary rounds, until a much better performance in the semi-finals left Foster in fourth position, posting a score of 338.90. Foster, however, finished only in eighth place in the final by one point ahead of her teammate Christina Loukas, with a score of 316.70, keeping the Americans without an Olympic diving medal for the second consecutive time.

== Personal life ==
Foster currently resides in The Woodlands, Texas, with her husband Matthew and daughter Anna. Being raised in a Christian community, she is an active member of Needham Road Baptist Church in her birthplace Conroe, where she teaches children's church.

Foster also came from a sporting family, where her sister Holly Jo was a successful Big Ten diver at Ohio State University, and her father Olen Underwood, a retired state administrative judge, played for the New York Giants, Houston Oilers, and Denver Broncos in the National Football League (NFL).
