= 1998 NCAA Division I Women's Swimming and Diving Championships =

American college aquatic sports competition

- Host city: Minneapolis, Minnesota
- Date(s): March 1998
- Venue(s): University Aquatic Center; University of Minnesota

The 1998 NCAA Women's Division I Swimming and Diving Championships were contested at the 17th annual NCAA-sanctioned swim meet to determine the team and individual national champions of Division I women's collegiate swimming and diving in the United States.

This year's events were hosted at the University Aquatic Center at the University of Minnesota in Minneapolis, Minnesota.

Stanford topped the team standings, finishing 44 points ahead of Arizona. It was the Cardinal's record eighth national title and their sixth in seven seasons.

== Team standings ==
- Note: Top 10 only
- (H) = Hosts
- ^{(DC)} = Defending champions
- Full results

Rank	Team	Points
1st place, gold medalist(s)	Stanford	422
2nd place, silver medalist(s)	Arizona	378
3rd place, bronze medalist(s)	Georgia	368
4	SMU	339
5	USC ^{(DC)}	277
6	Auburn	269 1/2
7	Michigan	249 1/2
8	California	237
9	Texas	211
10	Northwestern	149
16	Minnesota (H)	65

== See also ==
- List of college swimming and diving teams
