= Jessica Foschi =

American competition swimmer (born 1980)

Personal information
- Born: 1980 (age 45–46)
- Education: Stanford University; Duke Law School (JD)

Sport
- Sport: Swimming
- Club: Long Island Aquatic Club

Jessica Kate Foschi (born 1980) is an American former competition swimmer.

== Early life and education ==
Foschi is from Old Brookville, New York, and started swimming competitively at five years old at the Long Island Aquatic Club. By the age of 12 she was setting regional age group records. In 1992, she made the Junior National Team and won three national freestyle events.

She graduated from Friends Academy high school in 1998, and went on to attend Stanford University. She graduated from Duke Law School in 2007. While at Duke, she wrote a 2006 law review note on the general issues of doping and sports in the Duke Journal of Comparative & International Law that is described as "impressive" in a 2015 textbook about sports law that also reviews and analyzes her experience with USA Swimming, the American Arbitration Association, FINA, and the Court of Arbitration for Sport that began in 1995.

== Swimming career ==
In March 1995, at age 14, Foschi placed second in the 800 freestyle at the Spring Nationals to Janet Evans by less than a half-second. By November 1995, Foschi had a global ranking of 13th in the 800 freestyle, and according to Newsday was considered by "most swimming observers" to be a "longshot" for the 1996 Olympics team but otherwise "a clear candidate for elite status later in her career."

In November 1995, The Atlanta Journal-Constitution reported that Foschi tested positive for steroids after coming in third place for the 1500-meter freestyle at the August 1995 Summer Nationals championships in Pasadena, California. The steroid found in her urine, mesterolone, was not legally available in the United States and was found in her sample at one of the highest levels measured in a male or female athlete.

In November 1995, a three-member USA Swimming panel, by a vote of 2–1, put Foschi on probation, which meant she continued to be eligible to compete, including for the 1996 Olympics. After Foschi, her parents, and coach submitted polygraph tests supporting their denials of knowledge about the use of steroids, the panel found Foschi either had no knowledge of consuming the steroid or had been sabotaged. Medical evidence was submitted to the panel that found chronic steroid use "very improbable" and showed all subsequent tests were negative for the steroid. The sabotage finding was the first in United States sports, and panel members who believed Foschi was a victim of sabotage noted the high level of the steroid found in her test result.

After the probation decision, Foschi set New York State records in the 200-yard freestyle and the 500-yard freestyle in November 1995. According to the Buffalo News, Foschi received "polite applause" at the awards ceremony, and commented about the impact of the probation decision, "It's a little more difficult than it normally would be, but I'm basically trying to focus on my swimming, and not try to worry too much about that. It only messes up my focus."

In February 1996, the president of USA Swimming appealed the probation decision to the USA Swimming board, seeking an automatic suspension because of the duty of an athlete to guard against sabotage, and there was a hearing in which Foschi testified and denied knowingly consuming banned substances. During the hearing, it was stipulated that Foschi did not knowingly take mesterolone, and the issue to be decided was whether international swimming guidelines permitted a lack of knowledge to serve as a defense. In February 1996, USA Swimming changed the sanction to a two-year suspension, which made her ineligible to compete in the Olympic trials. FINA, the organization that administers international swimming competitions, then imposed a lighter sanction on another swimmer in a similar case, and the USA Swimming president then again appealed the suspension decision to the USA Swimming board, which in late February 1996, removed the suspension and restored the two-year probation.

Before the suspension was decided, Foschi's parents filed a lawsuit in the United States federal court system on her behalf against USA Swimming and the United States Olympic Committee to contest the suspension, and the case was moved to a New York trial court. (Note: This lawsuit later resulted in a settlement agreement for USA Swimming to pay $92,000 for legal costs incurred on behalf of Foschi.) After USA Swimming restored the probation, Foschi competed in the U.S. Olympics trials in March 1996. Foschi finished the trials without qualifying for the U.S. Olympic team, placing 4th in the 800-meter freestyle, 5th in the 400 freestyle, and 9th in the 200 freestyle. After the trials, Foschi commented, "I wasn't that concerned about not making the team, I just wanted to swim the fastest time."

Before competing in the Olympics trials, Foschi had filed an appeal pursuant to the Amateur Sports Act of 1978 and testified before an American Arbitration Association panel. In April 1996, the AAA panel removed all United States sanctions and in its ruling stated "the imposition of any sanction on [Foschi] so deeply offends our deeply rooted and historical concepts of fundamental fairness so as to be arbitrary and capricious", and found FINA strict liability rules to be unenforceable. The AAA decision also noted the recent FINA decision to impose lighter sanctions in a similar case.

In June 1996, FINA imposed a retroactive two-year international suspension against Foschi as of August 1995. In August 1996, Foschi won the national 5K open water championship in Ft. Lauderdale, Florida. Shortly before the open water competition, Foschi placed 9th in the 1500 meter freestyle at the United States Swimming National Championships, and referring to the FINA decision, said, "It finally all caught up with me. I didn't feel it before at all and now it finally hit me." Foschi appealed the FINA decision to the Court of Arbitration for Sport, which decided Foschi had failed to affirmatively disprove any responsibility for the results of the steroid test, reduced the suspension to six months and ordered $10,000 paid to Foschi for legal costs.

Foschi swam in college with the Stanford University team and was the captain of the team her senior year. In the 2000–2001 season, the Stanford team placed second at the Division I NCAA Swimming and Diving Championships and Foschi was the NCAA Division I individual champion for the 500-yard freestyle, and the runner up for the 1650-yard freestyle. She also tried out for the United States' Olympic team in 2000 and 2004, but did not qualify.

== Awards and honors ==
In 1995, 1996, and 1997, Foschi was the New York state champion in the 200 and 500 freestyle. She was the national high school champion in the 500 swimming event in 1996. In 1996, as a member of the US National Team, she ranked as one of the top 16 swimmers in the world for the 800 meters.

In 1996, Foschi won the national 5K open water championship in Ft. Lauderdale, Florida, and the 10k open water championship in 1997. In 1998 she finished first in the 100-yard freestyle in the 1998 Speedo junior championship.

In 1997 and 1998, she earned Scholastic All-American honors as an independent swimmer, and ultimately was an All-American 15 times.

The New York State record for the 500 freestyle set in 1995 was held by Foschi for 22 years.

In 2019, Foschi was named to the Nassau County High School Athletics Hall of Fame.

== Personal life ==
Her brother, J. P. Foschi, was signed by the New York Jets in 2004.
