= NCAA Division I women's swimming and diving championships =

College swimming and diving tournament

- Association: NCAA
- Sport: Swimming and Diving
- Founded: 1982; 44 years ago
- Division: Division I
- No. of teams: 65
- Country: United States
- Most recent champion: Virginia (6th title)
- Most titles: Stanford (11)
- Broadcaster: ESPNU
- Website: NCAA.com

The NCAA Division I women's swimming and diving championships are contested at an annual swim meet hosted by the National Collegiate Athletic Association to determine the individual and team champions of women's collegiate swimming and diving among its Division I members in the United States. It has been held every year since 1982, except 2020.

The meet is typically held on the second-to-last weekend (Thursday-Saturday) in March.

The swimming-portion of the meet takes place in a 25-yard pool, except in 2000 and 2004 which swam in a 25-meter course.

Stanford have been the most successful program, with 11 national titles.

Virginia are the 6-time reigning national champions, winning their sixth consecutive national title in 2026.

== History ==
Swimming was one of twelve women's sports added to the NCAA championship program for the 1981-82 school year, as the NCAA engaged in battle with the Association for Intercollegiate Athletics for Women (AIAW) for sole governance of women's collegiate sports. The AIAW continued to conduct its established championship program in the same twelve (and other) sports; however, after a year of dual women's championships, the NCAA conquered the AIAW and usurped its authority and membership.

== Events ==
=== Individual swimming events ===
- Freestyle events
  - 50-yard Freestyle (1982−present)
  - 100-yard Freestyle (1982−present)
  - 200-yard Freestyle (1982−present)
  - 500-yard Freestyle (1982−present)
  - 1,650-yard Freestyle (1982−present)
- Backstroke events
  - 100-yard Backstroke (1982−present)
  - 200-yard Backstroke (1982−present)
- Breaststroke events
  - 100-yard Breaststroke (1982−present)
  - 200-yard Breaststroke (1982−present)
- Butterfly events
  - 100-yard Butterfly (1982−present)
  - 200-yard Butterfly (1982−present)
- Medley events
  - 200-yard individual medley (1982−present)
  - 400-yard individual medley (1982−present)

=== Relay swimming events ===
- Freestyle relay events
  - 200-yard freestyle relay (1982−present)
  - 400-yard freestyle relay (1982−present)
  - 800-yard freestyle relay (1982−present)
- Medley relay events
  - 200-yard medley relay (1982−present)
  - 400-yard medley relay (1982−present)

=== Diving events ===
- Diving events
  - One-meter diving (1982−present)
  - Three-meter diving (1982−present)
  - Platform diving (1990−present)

== Discontinued events ==
=== Individual swimming events ===
- Backstroke events
  - 50-yard Backstroke (1982−1983)
- Breaststroke events
  - 50-yard Breaststroke (1982−1983)
- Butterfly events
  - 50-yard Butterfly (1982−1983)
- Medley events
  - 100-yard individual medley (1982−1983)

== Results ==
NCAA Division I women's swimming and diving championships
Year	Site	Natatorium	Championship Results			
Year	Site	Natatorium	Champion	Points	Runner-up	Points
1982; Details	Gainesville, FL	O'Connell Center	Florida	505	Stanford	383
1983; Details	Lincoln, NE	Bob Devaney Sports Center	Stanford	418½	Florida	389½
1984; Details	Indianapolis, IN	Indiana University Natatorium	Texas	392	Stanford	324
1985; Details	Tuscaloosa, AL	Alabama Aquatics Center	Texas (2)	643	Florida	400
1986; Details	Fayetteville, AR	Arkansas Natatorium	Texas (3)	633	Florida	586
1987; Details	Indianapolis, IN	Indiana University Natatorium	Texas (4)	648½	Stanford	631½
1988; Details	Austin, TX	Texas Swimming Center	Texas (5)	661	Florida	542½
1989; Details	Indianapolis, IN	Indiana University Natatorium	Stanford (2)	610½	Texas	547
1990; Details	Austin, TX	Texas Swimming Center	Texas (6)	632	Stanford	622½
1991; Details	Indianapolis, IN	Indiana University Natatorium	Texas (7)	746	Stanford	653
1992; Details	Austin, TX	Texas Swimming Center	Stanford (3)	735½	Texas	651
1993; Details	Minneapolis, MN	University Aquatic Center	Stanford (4)	649½	Florida	421
1994; Details	Indianapolis, IN	Indiana University Natatorium	Stanford (5)	512	Texas	421
1995; Details	Austin, TX	Texas Swimming Center	Stanford (6)	497½	Michigan	478½
1996; Details	Ann Arbor, MI	Donald B. Canham Natatorium	Stanford (7)	478	SMU	397
1997; Details	Indianapolis, IN	Indiana University Natatorium	USC	406	Stanford	395
1998; Details	Minneapolis, MN	University Aquatic Center	Stanford (8)	422	Arizona	378
1999; Details	Athens, GA	Gabrielsen Natatorium	Georgia	504½	Stanford	441
2000; Details	Indianapolis, IN	Indiana University Natatorium	Georgia (2)	490½	Arizona	472
2001; Details	East Meadow, NY	Nassau County Aquatic Center	Georgia (3)	389	Stanford	387½
2002; Details	Austin, TX	Texas Swimming Center	Auburn	474	Georgia	386
2003; Details	Auburn, AL	James E. Martin Aquatics Center	Auburn (2)	536	Georgia	373
2004; Details	College Station, TX	Student Recreation Center Natatorium	Auburn (3)	569	Georgia	431
2005; Details	West Lafayette, IN	Boilermaker Aquatic Center	Georgia (4)	609½	Auburn	492
2006; Details	Athens, GA	Gabrielsen Natatorium	Auburn (4)	518½	Georgia	515½
2007; Details	Minneapolis, MN	University Aquatic Center	Auburn (5)	535	Arizona	477
2008; Details	Columbus, OH	McCorkle Aquatic Pavilion	Arizona	484	Auburn	348
2009; Details	College Station, TX	Student Recreation Center Natatorium	California	411½	Georgia	400½
2010; Details	West Lafayette, IN	Boilermaker Aquatic Center	Florida (2)	382	Stanford	379½
2011; Details	Austin, TX	Texas Swimming Center	California (2)	424	Georgia	394½
2012; Details	Auburn, AL	James E. Martin Aquatics Center	California (3)	412½	Georgia	366
2013; Details	Indianapolis, IN	Indiana University Natatorium	Georgia (5)	477	California	393
2014; Details	Minneapolis, MN	University Aquatic Center	Georgia (6)	528	Stanford	402.5
2015; Details	Greensboro, NC	Greensboro Aquatic Center	California (4)	513	Georgia	452
2016; Details	Atlanta, GA	Georgia Tech Aquatic Center	Georgia (7)	414	Stanford	395
2017; Details	Indianapolis, IN	Indiana University Natatorium	Stanford (9)	526.5	California	366
2018; Details	Columbus, OH	McCorkle Aquatic Pavilion	Stanford (10)	593	California	373
2019; Details	Austin, TX	Texas Swimming Center	Stanford (11)	456.5	California	419
2020	Athens, GA	Gabrielsen Natatorium	Cancelled due to the coronavirus pandemic			
2021; Details	Greensboro, NC	Greensboro Aquatic Center	Virginia	491	NC State	354
2022; Details	Atlanta, GA	Georgia Tech Aquatic Center	Virginia (2)	551.5	Texas	406
2023; Details	Knoxville, TN	Allan Jones Aquatic Center	Virginia (3)	541.5	Texas	414.5
2024; Details	Athens, GA	Gabrielsen Natatorium	Virginia (4)	527.5	Texas	441
2025; Details	Federal Way, WA	Weyerhaeuser King County Aquatics Center	Virginia (5)	544	Stanford	417
2026; Details	Atlanta, GA	Georgia Tech Aquatic Center	Virginia (6)	589	Stanford	380.5
2027	Austin, Texas	Lee and Joe Jamail Texas Swimming Center				
2028	Austin, Texas	Lee and Joe Jamail Texas Swimming Center				

== Champions ==
=== Team titles ===
National Championships by school: 11, 7, 5, 4, 2, 1

Team	Number	Years won
Stanford	11	1983, 1989, 1992, 1993, 1994, 1995, 1996, 1998, 2017, 2018, 2019
Texas	7	1984, 1985, 1986, 1987, 1988, 1990, 1991
Georgia	7	1999, 2000, 2001, 2005, 2013, 2014, 2016
Virginia	6	2021, 2022, 2023, 2024, 2025, 2026
Auburn	5	2002, 2003, 2004, 2006, 2007
California	4	2009, 2011, 2012, 2015
Florida	2	1982, 2010
USC	1	1997
Arizona	1	2008

== Meet records ==
Event	Time		Name	Club	Date	Location	Ref
50 yd freestyle	20.37	=, NR	Gretchen Walsh	Virginia	March 21, 2024	Athens, Georgia	
50 yd freestyle	20.37	=, r, NR	Gretchen Walsh	Virginia	March 20, 2025	Federal Way, Washington	
100 yd freestyle	44.71	NR	Gretchen Walsh	Virginia	March 22, 2025	Federal Way, Washington	
200 yd freestyle	1:39.10	NR	Missy Franklin	California	March 20, 2015	Greensboro, North Carolina	
500 yd freestyle	4:24.06	NR	Katie Ledecky	Stanford	March 16, 2017	Indianapolis, Indiana	
1650 yd freestyle	15:07.57		Katie Ledecky	Stanford	March 17, 2018	Columbus, Ohio	
100 yd backstroke	48.24		Claire Curzan	Virginia	March 20, 2026	Atlanta, Georgia	
200 yd backstroke	1:46.10		Claire Curzan	Virginia	March 21, 2026	Atlanta, Georgia	
100 yd breaststroke	55.73	NR	Lilly King	Indiana	March 22, 2019	Austin, Texas	
200 yd breaststroke	2:01.29	NR	Kate Douglass	Virginia	March 18, 2023	Knoxville, Tennessee	
100 yd butterfly	46.97	NR	Gretchen Walsh	Virginia	March 21, 2025	Federal Way, Washington	
200 yd butterfly	1:49.11		Emma Sticklen	Texas	March 22, 2025	Federal Way, Washington	
200 yd individual medley	1:48.37	NR	Kate Douglass	Virginia	March 16, 2023	Knoxville, Tennessee	
400 yd individual medley	3:54.60	NR	Ella Eastin	Stanford	March 16, 2018	Columbus, Ohio	
200 yd freestyle relay	1:24.05		(Italy) Jasmine Nocentini (21.26); Gretchen Walsh (20.23); Alex Walsh (21.23); Maxine Parker (21.33)	Virginia	March 23, 2024	Athens, Georgia	
400 yd freestyle relay	3:05.26		Claire Curzan (46.62); Madi Mintenko (46.73); Anna Moesch (45.61); (Italy) Sara Curtis (46.30)	Virginia	March 21, 2026	Atlanta, Georgia	
800 yd freestyle relay	6:45.21		(South Africa) Aimee Canny (1:41.68); Madi Mintenko (1:41.43); Bailey Hartman (1:43.07); Anna Moesch (1:39.03)	Virginia	March 18, 2026	Atlanta, Georgia	
200 yd medley relay	1:31.10	NR	Claire Curzan (23.17); Alex Walsh (25.62); Gretchen Walsh (20.88); Maxine Parker (21.43)	Virginia	March 19, 2025	Federal Way, Washington	
400 yd medley relay	3:20.20		Claire Curzan (49.63); Alex Walsh (56.37); Gretchen Walsh (47.35); Maxine Parker (46.85)	Virginia	March 21, 2025	Federal Way, Washington	
1m Springboard	365.75		Mia Vallee	Miami	March 17, 2022	Atlanta, Georgia	
3m Springboard	437.75		Christina Loukas	Indiana	March 20, 2009	College Station, Texas	
Platform	399.80		Ellie Cole	Stanford	March 21, 2026	Atlanta, Georgia	

Legend: # – Record awaiting ratification by NCAA; NR – American record;
Records not set in finals: p – preliminary; sf – semifinal; r – relay 1st leg; rh – relay heat 1st leg; b – B final; † – en route to final mark; tt – time trial;

== See also ==
- List of college swimming and diving teams
- AIAW Intercollegiate Women's Swimming and Diving Champions
- NCAA Men's Swimming and Diving Championships (Division I, Division II, Division III)
- NCAA Women's Swimming and Diving Championships (Division II, Division III)
- NAIA women's swimming and diving championships
