= Lara Jackson =

American swimmer

Personal information
- Full name: Lara Marie Jackson
- National team: United States
- Born: October 14, 1986 (age 39) El Paso, Texas, U.S.
- Height: 5 ft 8 in (173 cm)

Sport
- Sport: Swimming
- Strokes: Freestyle
- Club: Tucson Ford Dealers Aquatics
- College team: University of Arizona
Medal record
Women's swimming
Representing the United States
Pan American Games
Gold medal – first place	2011 Guadalajara	50 m freestyle

Lara Marie Jackson (born October 14, 1986) is a retired American competitive swimmer who specialized in freestyle. She swam for the University of Arizona from 2005 to 2009 where she was a 9-time NCAA champion. She is the former American record-holder in both the 50-yard freestyle, and the long course 50-meter freestyle.

Jackson set the American record in the prelims of the women's 50-meter freestyle at the 2008 U.S. Olympic Trials with a time of 24.50. Her record lasted only hours as Dara Torres broke it later that afternoon in the semi-finals. Jackson ultimately finished 3rd in the 50 free behind Torres and Jessica Hardy. Despite Hardy's withdrawal from the Olympic team prior to the Games, Jackson was not added to the roster.

At the 2009 NCAA Championship meet, Jackson set the NCAA, meet, and American record in the 50-yard freestyle with a time of 21.40. Her record time was broken in 2011 by Ariana Vanderpool-Wallace from Auburn.

== Personal bests (long course) ==
Event	Time	Date
50 m freestyle	24.50	June 2008
100 m freestyle	56.17	July 2009
