= Caroline Bruce =

American swimmer (born 1986)

Personal information
- Full name: Caroline Cadman Bruce
- National team: United States
- Born: June 9, 1986 (age 40) Wichita, Kansas, U.S.
- Height: 5 ft 8 in (1.73 m)
- Weight: 148 lb (67 kg)

Sport
- Sport: Swimming
- Strokes: Breaststroke, individual medley
- Club: Wichita Swim Club
- College team: Stanford University

Caroline Cadman Bruce (born June 9, 1986), later known by her married name Caroline McAndrew, is an American former competition swimmer who represented the United States at the 2004 Summer Olympics and placed ninth in the breaststroke. She competed in the preliminary heats of the women's 200-meter breaststroke.

After the 2004 Olympics, Bruce attended Stanford University, where she competed for the Stanford Cardinal women's swimming team, specializing in the breaststroke and individual medley events. Bruce was the 2005 NCAA champion in the 100-yard and 200-yard breaststroke, and received 13 All-American honors during her college career. These victories followed her first national championship in the summer of 2003 in the 200-meter breaststroke in College Park, Maryland. Bruce was also a member of the U.S. team for the 2005 World University Games, and had surgery on her shoulder afterwards. In 2008, she had a second shoulder surgery.

Bruce is a 2004 graduate of Trinity Academy in Wichita, Kansas. While attending Trinity she won 13 Kansas state titles, the tying the record number of wins by any female swimmer in the state of Kansas. After high school, she went on to attend Stanford University, where she graduated with a B.A. and M.A. in communications.

In 2014, she was inducted into the Kansas Sports Hall of Fame.

== See also ==
- List of Stanford University people
