= Kara Denby =

American swimmer

Personal information
- National team: United States
- Born: May 28, 1986 (age 40) Northridge, California, U.S.
- Height: 1.73 m (5 ft 8 in)

Sport
- Sport: Swimming
- Strokes: Freestyle, Breaststroke
- Club: Conejo Simi Aquatics
- College team: Auburn University
Medal record
Women's swimming
Representing the United States
World Championships (SC)
Gold medal – first place	2008 Manchester	4x100 m medley relay

Kara Denby (born May 28, 1986) is an American swimmer. She swam for the United States team at the 2008 FINA Short Course World Championships, where she won a gold medal and set a world record in the women's 4 × 100 m medley relay along with Margaret Hoelzer, Jessica Hardy and Rachel Komisarz.

Denby was a 24-time All-American at Auburn University between the years of 2004 and 2008. In 2006 and 2007 the Auburn University Women's Swimming and Diving team took home the NCAA National Team title.

== See also ==
- List of Auburn University people
- World record progression 4 × 100 metres medley relay
