= Arizona Wildcats swimming and diving =

Program of the University of Arizona

Arizona Wildcat Swimming and Diving
- University: University of Arizona
- Head coach: Ben Loorz (men's, women's & diving)
- Conference: Big 12 Conference
- Location: Tucson, Arizona, US
- Home pool: Hillenbrand Aquatic Center
- Nickname: Wildcats
- Colors: Cardinal and Navy

Men's NCAA Champions
- 2008

Women's NCAA Champions
- 2008 WAC; 1975, 1976, 1977, 1978 Pac-12; 2000, 2006, 2007, 2008

The Arizona Wildcats swimming and diving program represents The University of Arizona in NCAA Division I intercollegiate men's and women's swimming and diving competition. The Wildcats currently compete in the Big 12 Conference.

From 1989 to 2011, he served as the swimming head coach for the Arizona Wildcats at the University of Arizona. His swimmers won 49 NCAA individual titles, 31 NCAA relay titles, and 2 NCAA team championships. While at Arizona, he also led Tucson Ford Aquatics (previously Hillenbrand Aquatics) to several national team championships. The Wildcats won their first and only national championship in both Men's and Women's in 2008 under former head coach Frank Busch.

== Men's swimming and diving ==
=== NCAA team championships ===
- 2008 – coach: Frank Busch

=== Individual champions ===
Year	Athlete	Event
1981	Doug Towne	500 Freestyle
1983	George DiCarlo	500 Freestyle
1984	George DiCarlo	500 Freestyle
1989	Mariusz Podkościelny	1,650 Freestyle
1993	Seth Pepper	100 Butterfly
1994	Chad Carvin	500 Freestyle
1994	Chad Carvin	1,650 Freestyle
1996	Martin Pepper	100 Butterfly
1997	Ryk Neethling	1,650 Freestyle
1998	Ryk Neethling	200 Freestyle
1998	Ryk Neethling	500 Freestyle
1998	Ryk Neethling	1,650 Freestyle
1999	Ryk Neethling	200 Freestyle
1999	Ryk Neethling	500 Freestyle
1999	Ryk Neethling	1,650 Freestyle
2000	Ryk Neethling	200 Freestyle
2000	Ryk Neethling	500 Freestyle
2000	Roland Schoeman	50 Freestyle
2003	Simon Burnett	200 Freestyle
2005	Simon Burnett	200 Freestyle
2006	Simon Burnett	200 Freestyle
2006	Lyndon Ferns	100-Yard Butterfly
2007	Adam Ritter	200 Individual Medley
2007	Albert Subirats	100 Butterfly
2007	Albert Subirats	100 Butterfly
2007	Darian Townsend	200 Freestyle
2008	Albert Subirats	100 Butterfly
2008	Darian Townsend	200 Individual Medley
2009	Jean Basson	500 Freestyle
2010	Cory Chitwood	200 Backstroke
2010	Clark Burckle	200 Breaststroke
2011	Cory Chitwood	200 Backstroke
2012	Cory Chitwood	200 Backstroke
2012	Kevin Cordes	100 Breaststroke
2012	Austen Thompson	400 Individual Medley
2013	Kevin Cordes	100 Breaststroke
2013	Kevin Cordes	200 Breaststroke
2014	Kevin Cordes	100 Breaststroke
2014	Kevin Cordes	200 Breaststroke
2014	Brad Tandy	50 Freestyle
2015	Kevin Cordes	100 Breastroke

=== Relay champions ===
Year	Athlete	Event
1993	Todd Newman, Robert Abernethy, Seth Pepper, Mike McQuitty	200 Medley Relay
2006	Nick Thoman, Ivan Barnes, Albert Subirats, Adam Ritter	400 Medley Relay
2006	Albert Subirats, Dave Rollins, Lyndon Ferns, Simon Burnett	200 Medley Relay
2006	Simon Burnett, Lyndon Ferns, Tyler DeBerry, Adam Ritter	800 Freestyle Relay
2006	Simon Burnett, Lyndon Ferns, Albert Subirats, Adam Ritter	400 Freestyle Relay
2007	Jean Basson, Nicolas Nilo, Adam Ritter, Darian Townsend	800 Freestyle Relay
2008	Albert Subirats, Darian Townsend, Nicolas Nilo, Joel Greenshields	400 Freestyle Relay
2008	Jean Basson, Darian Townsend, Joel Greenshields, Nicolas Nilo	800 Freestyle Relay
2008	Albert Subirats, Ivan Barnes, Darian Townsend, Joel Greenshields	400 Medley Relay
2012	Mitchell Friedmann, Kevin Cordes, Giles Smith, Adam Small	200 Medley Relay
2013	Mitchell Friedmann, Kevin Cordes, Giles Smith, Nimrod Shapira Bar-Or	400 Medley Relay

=== Records ===
As of May 20, 2024

Event	Time	Athlete	Meet	Date	Additional Note(s)
50 y freestyle	18.80	Bradley Tandy	2014 Pac−12 Men's Swimming Championship	March 6, 2014	
100 y freestyle	42.00	Ralph Daleiden	2023 Minnesota Invitational	November 30, 2023	
200 y freestyle	1:31.20	Simon Burnett	2006 NCAA Division I Men's Swimming and Diving Championships	2006	
500 y freestyle	4:08.92	Jean Basson	2009 NCAA Division I Men's Swimming and Diving Championships	2009	
1000 y freestyle	8:45.27	Chad Carvin	1995 NCAA Division I Men's Swimming and Diving Championships	1995	
1650 y freestyle	14:31.38	Brooks Fail	2021 NCAA Division I Men's Swimming and Diving Championships	2021	
100 y butterfly	44.57	Albert Subirats	2007 NCAA Division I Men's Swimming and Diving Championships	2007	
200 y butterfly	1:40.16	Justin Wright	2018 NCAA Division I Men's Swimming and Diving Championships	2018	
100 y breaststroke	50.04	Kevin Cordes	2014 NCAA Division I Men's Swimming and Diving Championships	2014	
200 y breaststroke	1:48.66	Kevin Cordes	2014 NCAA Division I Men's Swimming and Diving Championships	2014	
100 y backstroke	44.83	Albert Subirats	2007 NCAA Division I Men's Swimming and Diving Championships	2007	
200 y backstroke	1:38.67	Jake Tapp	2009 NCAA Division I Men's Swimming and Diving Championships	2009	
200 y Individual Medley	Adam Ritter	Adam Ritter	2007 NCAA Division I Men's Swimming and Diving Championships	2007	
400 y Individual Medley	3:38.55	Brooks Fail	2022 NCAA Division I Men's Swimming and Diving Championships	2022	
200 y Free Relay	1:15.97	Tommy Palmer, Marin Ercegovic, Seth Miller, Ryan Perham	2023 Pac−12 Championships	2023	
400 y Free Relay	2:47.86	Albert Subirats, Nicolas Nilo, Darian Townsend, Adam Ritter	2007 NCAA Division I Men's Swimming and Diving Championships	2007	
800 y Free Relay	6:11.82	Jean Basson, Nicolas Nilo, Nimrod Shapira Bar-Or, Joel Greenshields	2009 NCAA Division I Men's Swimming and Diving Championships	2009	
200 y Medley Relay	1:22.90	Ryan Purdy, Ryan Foote, Seth Miller, Tommy Palmer	2024 Pac−12 Championships	2024	
400 y Medley Relay	3:02.09	Mitchell Friedemann, Kevin Cordes, Giles Smith, Nimrod Shapira Bar-Or	2013 NCAA Division I Men's Swimming and Diving Championships	2013	
