= Florida Gators swimming and diving =

Swimming and diving teams of the University of Florida

Florida Gators
- Founded: 1930
- University: University of Florida
- Athletic director: Scott Stricklin
- Head coach: Anthony Nesty (swimming); Bryan Gillooly (diving)
- Conference: Southeastern Conference
- Location: Gainesville, Florida, US
- Home pool: Ann Marie Rogers Swimming and Diving Pool at Stephen C. O'Connell Center Natatorium (Capacity: 1,200)
- Colors: Orange and blue

Men's NCAA Champions
- 1983, 1984

Women's NCAA Champions
- 1982, 2010

Women's AIAW Champions
- 1979

Men's Conference Champions
- 1937, 1938, 1939, 1940, 1941, 1953, 1954, 1956, 1957, 1958, 1959, 1960, 1961, 1962, 1963, 1964, 1965, 1966, 1967, 1968, 1970, 1971, 1979, 1980, 1981, 1983, 1984, 1985, 1986, 1990, 1991, 1992, 1993, 2013, 2014, 2015, 2016, 2017, 2018, 2019, 2020, 2021, 2022, 2023, 2024

Women's Conference Champions
- 1981, 1982, 1983, 1984, 1986, 1987, 1988, 1989, 1990, 1991, 1992, 1993, 1994, 1995, 1996, 2002, 2009, 2023, 2024

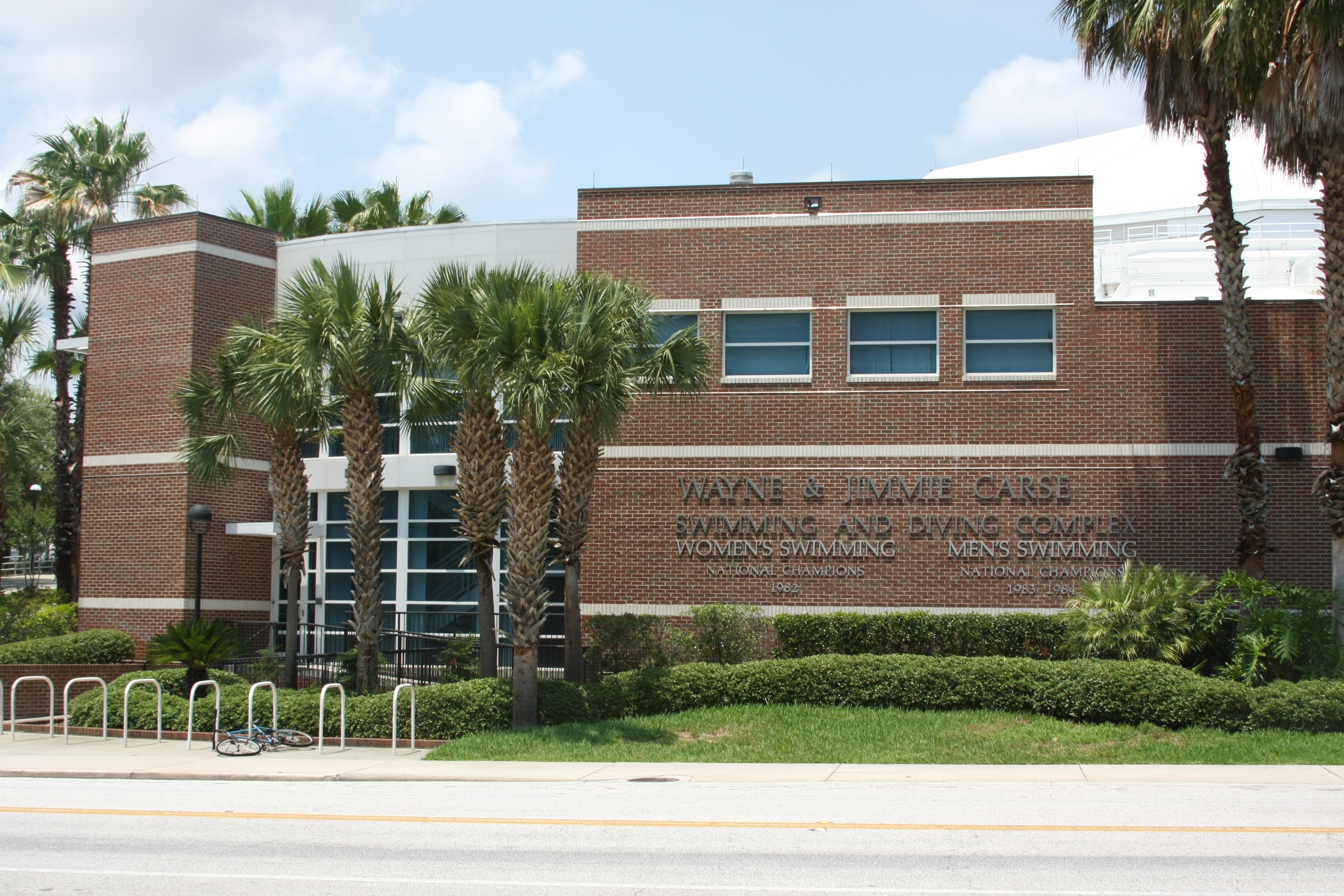
Carse Swimming Complex

The Florida Gators swimming and diving program represents the University of Florida in the aquatics sports of swimming and diving. The program includes separate men's and women's teams, both of which compete in Division I of the National Collegiate Athletic Association (NCAA) and the Southeastern Conference (SEC). The Gators host their home meets in the O'Connell Center Natatorium on the university's Gainesville, Florida campus. They are currently led by head swimming coach Anthony Nesty and diving coach Bryan Gillooly. Since Florida's swim and dive program was established in 1930, the men's team has won forty SEC team championships and two NCAA national championships. Since the NCAA and the SEC began sanctioning women's swimming in 1981, the Lady Gators have won seventeen SEC team championships and three national championships.

== Florida Gators Olympic medalists ==
The University of Florida has been represented in every Summer Olympic Games since 1968, and the Gators swimming and diving program has produced over eighty-five athletes who have competed in the Olympics since the program was started. The following is a list of former Florida swimmers, divers and coaches who won a gold (32), silver (18) or bronze (14) medal in a swimming or diving event in the Summer Olympic Games:

- Theresa Andrews, American gold medalist at 1984 Los Angeles Olympics
- Duncan Armstrong, Australian gold medalist at 1988 Seoul Olympics
- Catie Ball, American gold medalist at 1968 Mexico City Olympics
- Elizabeth Beisel, American silver and bronze medalist at 2012 London Olympics
- Greg Burgess, American silver medalist at 1992 Barcelona Olympics
- Tracy Caulkins, American gold medalist at 1984 Los Angeles Olympics
- Matt Cetlinski, American gold medalist at 1988 Seoul Olympics
- Stephen Clarke, Canadian bronze medalist at 1992 Barcelona Olympics
- Troy Dalbey, American gold medalist at 1988 Seoul Olympics
- Frédéric Delcourt, French silver medalist at 1984 Los Angeles Olympics
- Caeleb Dressel, American gold medalist at 2016 Rio Olympics, 2020 Tokyo Olympics, and 2024 Paris Olympics
- Conor Dwyer, American gold medalist at 2012 London Olympics
- Geoff Gaberino, American gold medalist at 1984 Los Angeles Olympics
- Sandy Goss, Canadian silver medalist at 1984 Los Angeles Olympics; silver medalist at 1988 Seoul Olympics
- Nicole Haislett, American gold medalist at 1992 Barcelona Olympics
- Mike Heath, American gold medalist and silver medalist at 1984 Los Angeles Olympics
- Whitney Hedgepeth, American gold and silver medalist at 1996 Atlanta Olympics
- Carlos Jayme, Brazilian bronze medalist at 2000 Sydney Olympics
- Jane Kerr, Canadian bronze medalist at 1988 Seoul Olympics
- David Larson, American gold medalist at 1984 Los Angeles Olympics
- Ryan Lochte, American gold and silver medalist at 2004 Athens Olympics; gold, silver and bronze medalist at the 2008 Beijing Olympics; gold, silver and bronze medalist at the 2012 London Olympics
- Lea Loveless, American gold and silver medalist at 1992 Barcelona Olympics
- Tim McKee, American silver medalist at 1972 Munich Olympics; silver medalist at 1976 Montreal Olympics
- Anthony Nesty, Surinamese gold medalist at 1988 Seoul Olympics; bronze medalist at 1992 Barcelona Olympics
- Kieran Smith, American bronze medalist at 2020 Summer Olympics
- Mark Stockwell, Australian silver medalist and bronze medalist at 1984 Los Angeles Olympics
- Ashley Tappin, American gold medalist at 1992 Barcelona Olympics; gold medalist at 2000 Sydney Olympics
- Dara Torres, American gold medalist at 1984 Los Angeles Olympics; silver and bronze medalist at 1988 Seoul Olympics; gold medalist at 1992 Barcelona Olympics; gold and bronze medalist at 2000 Sydney Olympics; and silver medalist at 2008 Beijing Olympics
- Darian Townsend, South African gold medalist at 2004 Athens Olympics
- Rafael Vidal, Venezuelan bronze medalist at 1984 Los Angeles Olympics
- Dana Vollmer, American gold medalist at 2004 Athens Olympics; gold medalist at 2012 London Olympics
- Allison Wagner, American silver medalist at 1996 Atlanta Olympics
- Janie Wagstaff, American gold medalist at 1992 Barcelona Olympics
- Laura Walker, American bronze medalist at 1988 Seoul Olympics
- Dan Wallace, British silver medalist at 2016 Rio de Janeiro Olympics
- Mary Wayte, American gold medalist at 1984 Los Angeles Olympics; silver and bronze medalist at 1988 Seoul Olympics
- Paige Zemina, American bronze medalist at 1988 Seoul Olympics
- David Zubero, Spanish bronze medalist at 1980 Moscow Olympics
- Martin Zubero, Spanish gold medalist at 1992 Barcelona Olympics

For a complete list of all current and former Florida Gators swimmers and divers who were ever members of a national Olympics swimming and diving team, please see "List of University of Florida Olympians."

== See also ==
- Florida Gators
- History of the University of Florida
- List of University of Florida Athletic Hall of Fame members
- List of University of Florida Olympians
- University Athletic Association
