= Sports in Indianapolis =

Sports in Indianapolis include major league franchises, collegiate athletics, and a variety of other club and individual sporting events that have taken place in Indianapolis, Indiana, United States. Indianapolis is the home to 11 professional sports teams. Two teams from the major professional sports leagues, the Indianapolis Colts and Indiana Pacers, are located in Indianapolis. The Indiana Fever of the Women's National Basketball Association (WNBA) started play in 2000, and are under the same ownership as the Pacers. The city is also home to three National Collegiate Athletic Association (NCAA) collegiate teams.

A number of minor league-level teams also play in the city. The Indianapolis Indians are the second-oldest Minor League Baseball team, having played in the city since 1902, and are currently members of the Triple-A International League. The Indianapolis AlleyCats were formed in 2012 as one of the founding teams of the American Ultimate Disc League (AUDL). The Indy Eleven soccer team began play in 2014 and are members of the United Soccer League (USL). The Pacers moved their NBA G League affiliate from Fort Wayne to Indianapolis in 2023 as the Indiana Mad Ants, and moved the team after the 2024–25 season to the northeast suburb of Noblesville as the Noblesville Boom.

Notably, Indianapolis is the headquarters of the NCAA, the main governing body for U.S. collegiate sports, the National Federation of State High School Associations, and the Indianapolis 500, one of three legs of the Triple Crown of Motorsport.

== Notable teams ==
Club	League	Sport	Venue	Founded	Established in Indianapolis	Championships in Indianapolis
Indianapolis Colts	NFL	Football	Lucas Oil Stadium	1953	1984	1 Super Bowl
Indiana Pacers	NBA	Basketball	Gainbridge Fieldhouse	1967	1967	3 ABA Championships; 0 NBA Championships
Indiana Fever	WNBA	Women's basketball	Gainbridge Fieldhouse	2000	2000	1 WNBA Championship

=== Indianapolis Colts (NFL) ===
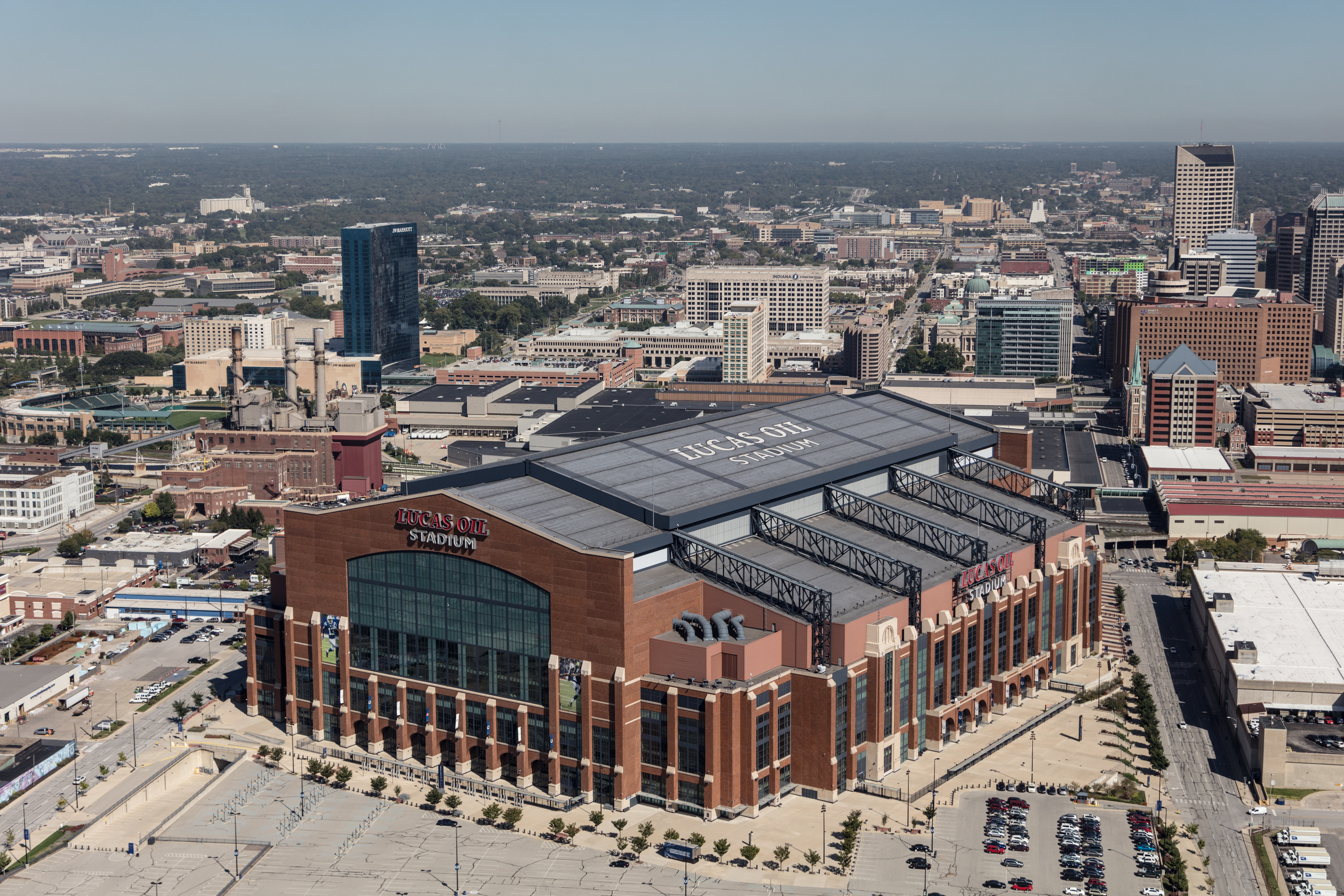
Lucas Oil Stadium, home of the Colts

The Indianapolis Colts are a professional American football team based in Indianapolis. The team is part of the South Division of the American Football Conference (AFC) in the National Football League (NFL). The Colts have won five NFL Championships, including two Super Bowl titles. The Colts relocated from Baltimore in 1984, and began their stay in Indianapolis winning 90 of 228 games through the 1997 season, including 5 playoff games. Since Jim Irsay assumed control of the franchise in 1998 after the death of his father Robert Irsay, the team has become the first in league history to win 12 games or more in five consecutive seasons (2003–2007). After their first playoff berth in Indianapolis in 1987, they missed the playoffs 7 consecutive years. In 1995 the Colts made it to their 1st AFC Championship Game since relocating but lost to the Pittsburgh Steelers on a last-second play. In 1998 GM Bill Polian drafted Peyton Manning out of Tennessee helping to turn the franchise around. Since drafting Manning the Colts have made the playoffs in 10 of 12 years and won Super Bowl XLI against the Chicago Bears in 2006, 29–17. Lucas Oil Stadium opened before the 2008 season, replacing the RCA Dome, as the new home of the Colts.

=== Indiana Pacers (NBA) ===
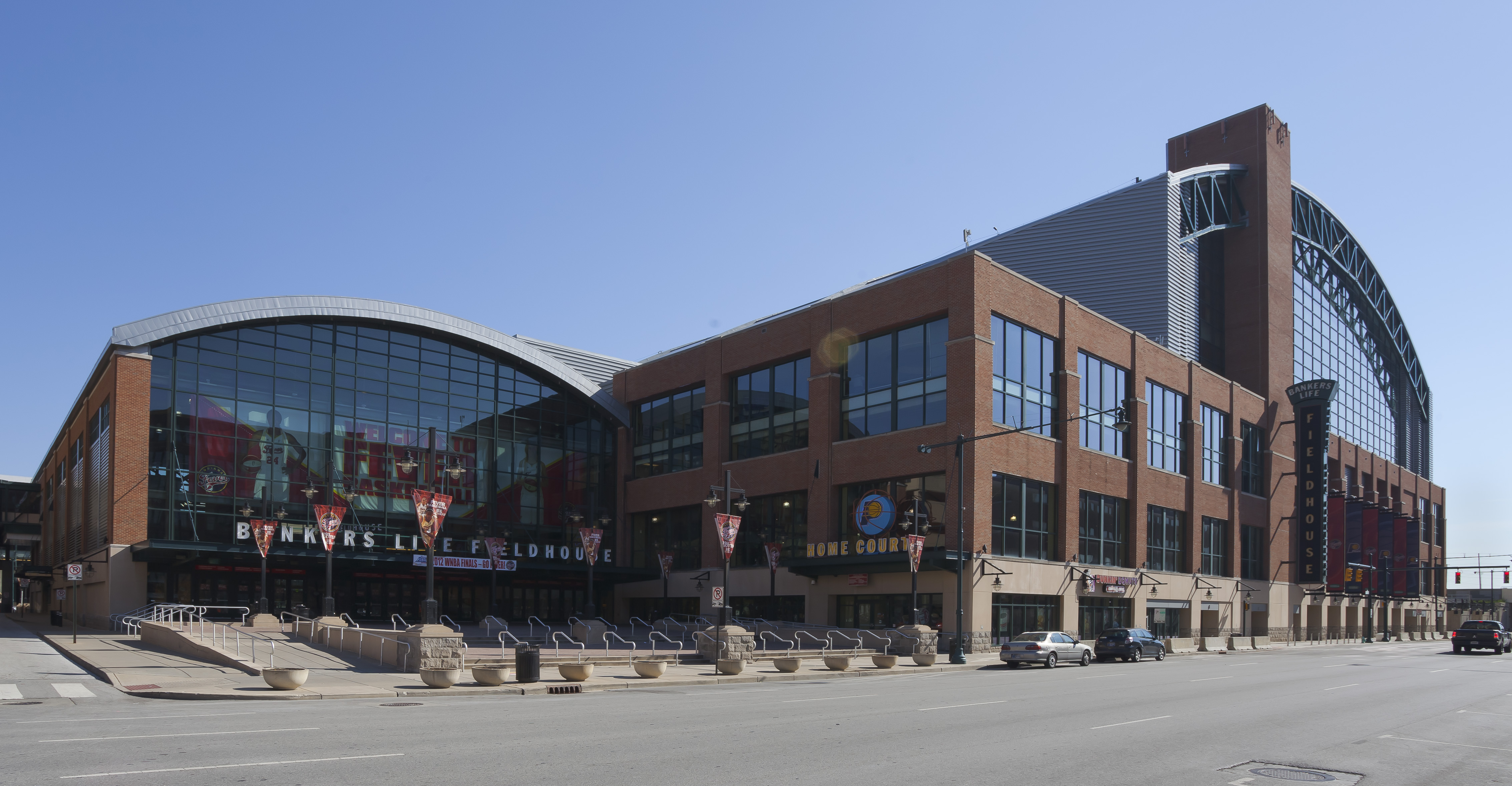
Gainbridge Fieldhouse is home to the Pacers and Fever.

The Indiana Pacers are a professional basketball team based in Indianapolis. The team is part of the Central Division in the National Basketball Association (NBA). The Pacers began play in the ABA in 1967 and won 3 ABA Championships. In 1976, the Pacers received an invitation to join the National Basketball Association. In the 1987 NBA draft, the Pacers selected Reggie Miller out of UCLA. Miller helped the team to make the playoffs 14 out of 17 seasons. To start the 1998–99 NBA season they opened their new arena, Conseco Fieldhouse, now Gainbridge Fieldhouse, after playing at Market Square Arena for 25 years. The Pacers reached their first NBA Finals in that same season but lost to the Lakers in 6 games. During the 2004–2005 season, the Pacers–Pistons brawl took place in Detroit and the team has struggled with their off the court image with numerous incidents. Reggie Miller retired the same season. Since then, the Pacers missed the playoffs in 2007, the first time since 1997 and for only the second time in 22 years.

=== Indiana Fever (WNBA) ===
The Indiana Fever are a professional women's basketball team based in Indianapolis. The team is part of the Women's National Basketball Association (WNBA). The Fever were one of the 2000 expansion teams. The WNBA awarded Indianapolis a team with the opening of Conseco Fieldhouse, now Gainbridge Fieldhouse. The Fever won their 1st game in Miami, against the Miami Sol, on national TV but finished the 2000 season in last place at 9–23 and received the 3rd overall pick in the 2001 WNBA draft. In the draft the Fever selected Tennessee superstar Tamika Catchings, although she was forced to sit out the 2001 season with a knee injury. Catchings won the 2002 WNBA Rookie of the Year and has led the Fever in points, rebounds, assists, and steals each season since. They first made the playoffs in 2002 but lost to the New York Liberty in 3 games. Since 2005 the Fever have posted four 21+ win seasons and made it to the Eastern Conference Finals three times. They reached the WNBA Finals for the first time in 2009, losing to the Phoenix Mercury three games to two. The Fever reached the WNBA Finals for the second time in 2012, and the team defeated the Minnesota Lynx three games to one to win their first WNBA Title. After the team selected college basketball icon Caitlin Clark as the first overall draft pick in 2024, the Fever set WNBA single-season records for per-game and total attendance that season.

== Minor league teams ==
Club	League	Sport	Venue	Founded	Established in Indianapolis	Championships in Indianapolis
Indianapolis Indians	International (Triple-A)	Baseball	Victory Field	1902	1902	2 International League; 12 American Association
Indy Eleven	USLC	Soccer	IU Michael A. Carroll Stadium	2013	2013	1 NASL Spring Season
Indy Eleven Women	USLW	Women's Soccer	Grand Park	2022	2022	1 USL W League
Indy Fuel	ECHL	Hockey	Fishers Event Center	2014	2014	0
Noblesville Boom	NBAG	Basketball	Riverview Health Arena at Innovation Mile	2007	2023	0
Fishers Freight	IFL	Indoor Football	Fishers Event Center	2023	2025	0
Indy Ignite	MLV	Volleyball	Fishers Event Center	2023	2025	0

=== Indianapolis Indians ===
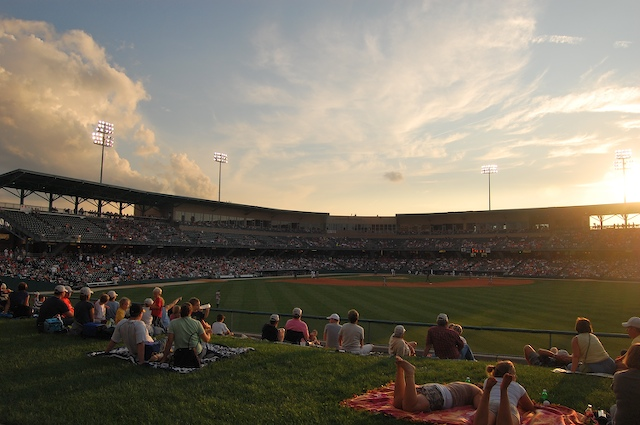
Victory Field during an Indians baseball game.

The Indianapolis Indians are a minor league baseball team based in Indianapolis. The team, which plays in the International League, is the AAA affiliate of the Pittsburgh Pirates. The Indians play at Victory Field, located in downtown Indianapolis.

Founded in 1902, the Indianapolis Indians are the second-oldest minor league franchise in professional sports, behind only the Rochester Red Wings.

In 1985, a group of local investors formed Indianapolis Baseball, Inc. to pursue a Major League Baseball team. The announcement was met with great fanfare; 12,000 season tickets were sold in anticipation of the new team, to be named the Indianapolis Arrows. The initiative was ultimately unsuccessful and season ticket holders were refunded by the end of the year.

=== Indy Eleven ===
Indy Eleven is a second-division professional soccer club formed in 2013 and plays at the IU Michael A. Carroll Track & Soccer Stadium in Indianapolis. The team competed in the North American Soccer League from 2014 to 2017. They won their first honor during the 2016 season, capturing the Spring Season Championship with an undefeated record. They almost were the NASL Champions, barely losing to the New York Cosmos 4–2 in a penalty shoot-out (0–0 after 90 minutes) during Soccer Bowl 2016. The Eleven made a bid in 2017 to join top-tier Major League Soccer as a 2020 expansion team but were passed over at that time. In 2018, the club joined the USL Championship, the second highest division. They have been expected to eventually relocate to Eleven Park, a proposed soccer-specific stadium, in downtown Indianapolis upon completion of the project. However, in 2024, Indianapolis mayor Joe Hogsett met with MLS commissioner Don Garber to discuss MLS expansion and proposed to build a stadium in the location of the old Indianapolis Heliport. Because of this, Eleven Park construction has been put on hold.

=== Indy Eleven Women ===
Indy Eleven is a second-tier soccer team formed in 2022 and plays at Grand Park in the Indianapolis suburb of Westfield. They won their first honor during the 2023 season, capturing the USL W-League Championship. They are expected to relocate to Eleven Park in downtown Indianapolis upon completion of construction in 2025. In conjunction with their relocation, they are expected to join the announced USL Super League, which is currently pursuing classification as a top-tier league. This would elevate the team to a major league team, if announced plans are followed.

=== Indy Fuel ===
The Indy Fuel is a minor league ice hockey team in the ECHL, the third tier of professional hockey in North America. The franchise was founded in 2013 and has been affiliated with the NHL's Chicago Blackhawks since the Fuel's foundation. The team has played at Indiana Farmers Coliseum since their founding. They are expected to relocate to the Indianapolis suburb of Fishers in 2024, upon completion of construction of the Fishers Event Center.

=== Noblesville Boom ===
The Noblesville Boom is a minor league basketball team in the NBA G League. The team was established in 2007 in the then NBA Development League (D-League), playing in the Allen County War Memorial Coliseum in Fort Wayne, Indiana as the Fort Wayne Mad Ants. They won a championship in the 2014 season. In 2015, the Indiana Pacers bought the team, and in 2023 they announced the team would relocate to Indianapolis as the Indiana Mad Ants. The Mad Ants initially planned to move from Gainbridge Fieldhouse to the suburb of Noblesville in 2024–25, coupled with a rebranding. The new venue, eventually known as Riverview Health Arena at Innovation Mile, was delayed to 2025–26, with the rebranding as the Noblesville Boom taking place after the 2024–25 season.

=== Fishers Freight ===
It was announced in November 2023 that the Indoor Football League would expand with a team in Indianapolis. The team is expected to begin play in 2025, in conjunction with the completion of construction of the Fishers Event Center.

=== Indy Ignite ===
It was announced in December 2023 that the Pro Volleyball Federation would expand with a team in Indianapolis. The team is expected to begin play in 2025, in conjunction with the completion of construction of the Fishers Event Center.

== Top tier amateur teams ==
Club	League	Sport	Venue	Founded	Established in Indianapolis	Championships in Indianapolis
FC Indiana Lionesses	WPSL Elite	Soccer	IU Michael A. Carroll Stadium	2000	2000	2 WPSL Championships; 2 USASA National Women's Open Cups
Indianapolis AlleyCats	AUDL	Ultimate	Grand Park	2012	2012	0

== Collegiate sports ==
Indianapolis has three universities that field teams in the NCAA, Butler University (Butler Bulldogs) and Indiana University Indianapolis (IU Indy Jaguars) in Division I and the University of Indianapolis (Indianapolis Greyhounds) in Division II. Butler is a member of the Big East Conference, IU Indy is a member of the Horizon League, and Indianapolis (or UIndy) is a member of the Great Lakes Valley Conference. The Marian University Knights compete in the NAIA.

== Motorsports ==
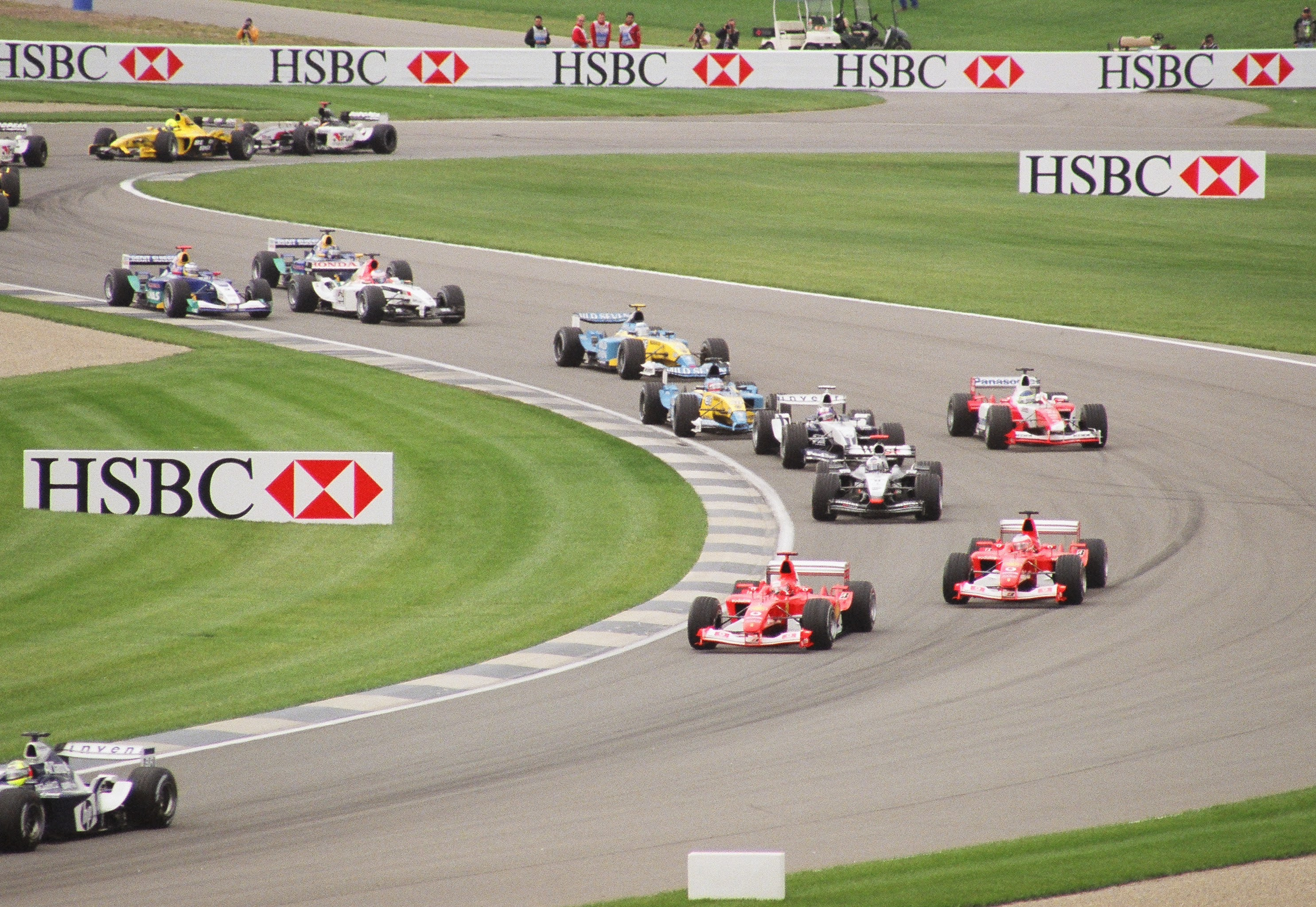
Formula One cars wind through the infield of the Indianapolis Motor Speedway at the start of the 2003 United States Grand Prix.

Indianapolis Motor Speedway hosts the Indianapolis 500, one of the most famous and prestigious auto races in the world. It is the world's most attended single-day sporting event. Also during May before the Indianapolis 500 the Speedway also uses the road course to run the IndyCar Grand Prix. Both races are a part of the IndyCar Series. The Speedway also hosts NASCAR's Brickyard 400. It has also previously hosted rounds on the Formula 1 and Moto GP calendars with, United States Grand Prix from 2000 to 2007, and Red Bull Indianapolis GP from 2008 to 2015 respectively.

Indianapolis is also the central base of several IndyCar racing teams, including Andretti Global, Arrow McLaren, Chip Ganassi Racing, Ed Carpenter Racing, Dreyer & Reinbold Racing, Juncos Hollinger Racing, and Rahal Letterman Lanigan Racing.

== Events hosted ==
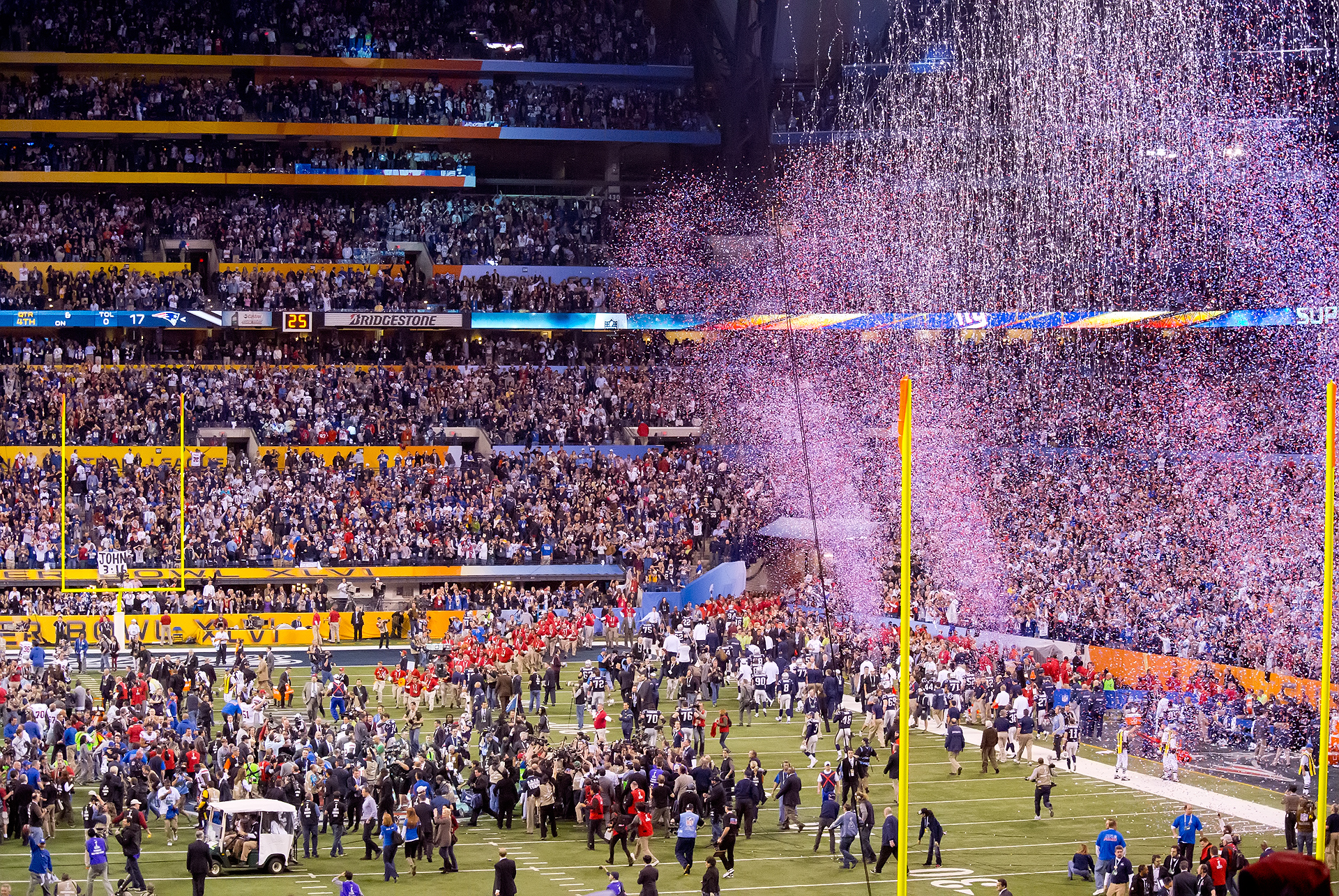
The city hosted Super Bowl XLVI at Lucas Oil Stadium in 2012.

Indianapolis has gained a reputation within the last thirty years for being a strong city for hosting major sporting events. While racing has been a major focus of the city for more than one hundred years, different sports, such as swimming and basketball, have become major focal points of the Indianapolis sports hosting landscape.

=== NCAA championships ===
Indianapolis has a special connection with college sports, as it is the headquarters of the NCAA and the home of the NCAA Hall of Fame. It has also hosted a wide variety of Division I NCAA national championship Events.

Indianapolis has hosted the Men's and Women's NCAA Final Fours, as well as other rounds of the NCAA basketball tournament, several times. Currently, Indianapolis has hosted the second most Men's Final Fours hosted, with eight. Indianapolis is scheduled to host its ninth Final Four in 2026. Kansas City currently has the most with ten. Indianapolis is currently tied for hosting the most Women's Final Fours, with New Orleans and Tampa Bay.

Men's basketball

Year	Stadium	Champion
1980	Market Square Arena	Louisville
1991	Hoosier Dome	Duke
1997	RCA Dome	Arizona
2000	RCA Dome	Michigan State
2006	RCA Dome	Florida
2010	Lucas Oil Stadium	Duke
2015	Lucas Oil Stadium	Duke
2021	Lucas Oil Stadium	Baylor
2026	Lucas Oil Stadium	Michigan
2029		

Women's basketball

Year	Stadium	Champion
2005	RCA Dome	Baylor
2011	Gainbridge Fieldhouse	Texas A&M
2016	Gainbridge Fieldhouse	UConn
2028	Lucas Oil Stadium	

Fencing

Year	Stadium	Champion
2017	Indiana Farmers Coliseum	Notre Dame

Rowing

Year	Stadium	Champion
2002	Eagle Creek Park	Brown
2003	Eagle Creek Park	Harvard
2013	Eagle Creek Park	Ohio State
2014	Eagle Creek Park	Ohio State

Men's swimming and diving

The Indiana University Natatorium has hosted 13 individual Olympic Trials. Eighteen individual swimming world records have been broken at the Natatorium, with swimmers such as Michael Phelps and Ryan Lochte having made multiple appearances at the facility. Most recently, the Natatorium hosted the 2017 NCAA Division I Men's Swimming and Diving Championships where several American and US Open records were broken.

Year	Stadium	Champion
1983	Indiana University Natatorium	Florida
1986	Indiana University Natatorium	Stanford
1988	Indiana University Natatorium	Texas
1989	Indiana University Natatorium	Texas
1990	Indiana University Natatorium	Texas
1992	Indiana University Natatorium	Stanford
1993	Indiana University Natatorium	Stanford
1995	Indiana University Natatorium	Michigan
1999	Indiana University Natatorium	Auburn
2013	Indiana University Natatorium	Michigan
2017	Indiana University Natatorium	Texas

Women's swimming and diving

Year	Stadium	Champion
1984	Indiana University Natatorium	Texas
1987	Indiana University Natatorium	Texas
1989	Indiana University Natatorium	Stanford
1991	Indiana University Natatorium	Texas
1994	Indiana University Natatorium	Stanford
1997	Indiana University Natatorium	USC
2000	Indiana University Natatorium	Georgia
2013	Indiana University Natatorium	Georgia
2017	Indiana University Natatorium	Stanford

Indoor track and field

Year	Stadium	Men's champion	Women's champion
1989	Hoosier Dome	Aransas	LSU
1990	Hoosier Dome	Arkansas	Texas
1991	Hoosier Dome	Arkansas	LSU
1992	Hoosier Dome	Arkansas	Florida
1993	Hoosier Dome	Arkansas	LSU
1994	RCA Dome	Arkansas	LSU
1995	RCA Dome	Arkansas	LSU
1996	RCA Dome	George Mason	LSU
1997	RCA Dome	Arkansas	LSU
1998	RCA Dome	Arkansas	Texas
1999	RCA Dome	Arkansas	Texas

Outdoor track and field

Year	Stadium	Men's champion	Women's champion
1986	Carroll Stadium	SMU	Texas

Women's volleyball

Year	Stadium	Champion
1987	Market Square Arena	Hawaiʻi

Men's water polo

Year	Stadium	Champion
1989	Indiana University Natatorium	UC Irvine

Women's water polo

Year	Stadium	Champion
2017	Indiana University Natatorium	Stanford

College Football Playoff

On November 1, 2017, it was announced that Indianapolis would host the 2022 College Football Playoff Championship Game at Lucas Oil Stadium, which will serve as the conclusion to the 2021 football season. This is the first time Indianapolis has hosted any iteration of the college football championship. It is also the first time that a college football national championship game will be held outside of the South or West.

Year	Stadium	Champion
2022	Lucas Oil Stadium	Georgia

=== Big Ten basketball tournament ===
Gainbridge Fieldhouse has hosted the Big Ten men's tournament 12 times through 2025, including five straight years from 2008 to 2012. The 2021 tournament was held at Lucas Oil Stadium. Indianapolis has also hosted the Big Ten women's tournament 21 times through 2025, all at Gainbridge Fieldhouse, including two long hosting stints from 2002 to 2012 and 2016 to 2022. Gainbridge Fieldhouse will host both tournaments in 2026.

=== Horizon League basketball tournaments ===
Indianapolis became an irregular home of the Horizon League men's basketball tournament, as Butler commonly was the first overall seed, thus making Hinkle Fieldhouse a common host for the semifinals and finals. Starting in 2020, Corteva Coliseum became the contractual host of the semifinals and final of both the Horizon men's and women's tournaments.

=== Big Ten Football Championship Game ===
In 2011, following the reorganization of the Big Ten Conference into two divisions and the creation of the Big Ten Football Championship Game, Indianapolis was selected to indefinitely host the event in Lucas Oil Stadium. The game is the culmination of the Big Ten football season, in which the East and West Division champions meet to determine who gets an automatic New Year's Six Bowl berth, typically being the Rose Bowl. However, due to the high level of play in the conference, a College Football Playoff berth is often on the line.

=== Indianapolis Tennis Championships ===
From 1988 to 2009, Indianapolis hosted a lower level tennis tournament, being classified as an ATP World Tour 250 series event. It was held at the now demolished Indianapolis Tennis Center, which was located on the campus of the former Indiana University–Purdue University Indianapolis (IUPUI). (Note: IUPUI was dissolved after the 2023–24 school year and replaced with Indiana University Indianapolis and Purdue University in Indianapolis, which share the former IUPUI campus.) Except for its first year, which featured clay courts, every edition of the tournament was played on hard court as an early lead-up event to the U.S. Open. Despite it being a lesser points event, it commonly attracted major players, such as Grand Slam champions Boris Becker, Patrick Rafter, John McEnroe, Andy Roddick, and Pete Sampras. Pete Sampras won the event three times, which is the most of any men's single player.

=== Motorsports ===
Indianapolis has its original roots in hosting large events in the Indianapolis 500, held at the Indianapolis Motor Speedway. Started in 1911, it quickly became among the most prestigious and famous races in the world. It remains the crown jewel of the IndyCar series. The Indianapolis Motor Speedway has since added several other events, including NASCAR's Brickyard 400, IndyCar's IndyCar Grand Prix, and the Red Bull Air Race of Indianapolis. The Lucas Oil Raceway, formerly O'Reilly Raceway Park, has also been home to various racing events, most notably the NHRA U.S. Nationals, widely considered the most prestigious drag racing event in the world.

==== Current Events ====
Years	Race	Series	Venue
1911–1916; 1919–1941; 1946–present	Indianapolis 500	IndyCar Series	Indianapolis Motor Speedway (Oval)
1961–present	U.S. Nationals	NHRA	Lucas Oil Raceway (Drag Strip)
1994–2020; 2024–present	Brickyard 400	NASCAR Cup Series	Indianapolis Motor Speedway (Oval)
1995-2011; 2022–present	TSport 200	NASCAR Truck Series	Lucas Oil Raceway (Oval)
2012–2019; 2024–present	Pennzoil 250	NASCAR Xfinity Series	Indianapolis Motor Speedway (Oval)
2014–present	Grand Prix of Indianapolis	IndyCar Series	Indianapolis Motor Speedway (Road)
2014; 2023–present	IMSA Battle on the Bricks	IMSA WeatherTech SportsCar Championship	Indianapolis Motor Speedway (Road)
2020–present	Indianapolis 8 Hours	Intercontinental GT Challenge	Indianapolis Motor Speedway (Road)

=== Super Bowl ===
Lucas Oil Stadium and the city of Indianapolis made a bid to host Super Bowl XLV in 2011 but lost to Dallas and Cowboys Stadium by only two NFL Owner votes. However, the city made another bid to host Super Bowl XLVI and managed to beat out Houston, Texas and Phoenix for the rights to host the Super Bowl. Super Bowl XLVI is widely considered to have been hosted extremely well. NFL Commissioner Roger Goodell suggested that Indianapolis may be a contender for future Super Bowls.

Season	Game	Stadium	Winner	Loser	Score
2011	XLVI	Lucas Oil Stadium	New York Giants	New England Patriots	21–17

=== NFL Combine ===
A few years after the Colts relocated and made Indianapolis its new home, their stadium was utilized for the NFL Combine, a week-long showcase for college football players hoping to get drafted into the NFL. From 1987 to 2008, the events were held as the RCA Dome. Starting in 2009, the NFL Combine moved to the new Lucas Oil Stadium. Coaches, general managers, and other front office management members from all 32 teams report to the city in February to assess young players. This is the largest single opportunity for the teams to evaluate potential draftees before the NFL Draft in April.

=== All-Star Games ===
Indianapolis has hosted several all-star games of various leagues. They hosted the ABA all-star game twice, the NBA game twice, and the Triple-A all star game once. Indianapolis hosted the NBA All-Star Game in 2024.

==== ABA All-Star Game ====
Year	Stadium	Winner	Loser	Score
1968	Hinkle Fieldhouse	East	West	126–120
1970	Fairgrounds Coliseum	West	East	128–98

==== NBA All-Star Game ====
Year	Stadium	Winner	Loser	Score
1985	Hoosier Dome	West	East	140–129
2024	Gainbridge Fieldhouse	East	West	211–186

==== WNBA All-Star Game ====
Year	Stadium	Winner	Loser	Score
2025	Gainbridge Fieldhouse	Team Collier	Team Clark	151-131

==== Triple-A All-Star Game ====
Year	Stadium	Winner	Loser	Score
2001	Victory Field	PCL	IL	9–5

==== ECHL All-Star Game ====
Year	Stadium	Winner	Loser	Score
2018	Indiana Farmers Coliseum	Mountain Division	South Division	6–5 (SO)

=== ABA and NBA Finals ===
In both the ABA and NBA, the championship series is hosted by the two teams that have advanced to the round, as opposed to the event being awarded prior to the teams being determined, like the Super Bowl. The Indiana Pacers have brought a championship series to Indianapolis multiple times in their history. While still playing in the ABA, from 1968 through 1976, Indianapolis were a partial host of the ABA Finals five times. The Pepsi Coliseum hosted the first four, in 1969, 1970, 1972, and 1973. Madison Square Garden was the Pacers' home for 1975, which would be their last appearance in the ABA Finals. Overall, Indianapolis hosted 13 ABA Finals games, more than any other city. Despite the high level of success of the Pacers during this era and the high number of games, the championship series never ended in Indianapolis, instead always being closed at the alternative team's arena.

Following the absorption of the ABA into the more established NBA, the Pacers began competing for the NBA Championship. Indianapolis has hosted two NBA Finals series, first in 2000 and again in 2025. In 2000, the games were played in Conseco Fieldhouse, the new home of the Pacers. The city hosted games 3, 4, and 5, with the Pacers winning the first and last of those games while losing the middle. The series was closed out in Los Angeles. In 2025, the games were played in the recently renamed Gainbridge Fieldhouse against the Oklahoma City Thunder. The city hosted games 3, 4, and 6; the Pacers won games 3 and 6 but lost game 4. The series was closed out in Oklahoma City.

==== ABA Finals ====
Year	Game	Stadium	Winner	Loser	Score
1969	Game 3	Indiana State Fairgrounds Coliseum	Oakland Oaks	Indiana Pacers	134–126
1969	Game 4	Indiana State Fairgrounds Coliseum	Oakland Oaks	Indiana Pacers	144–117
1970	Game 1	Indiana State Fairgrounds Coliseum	Indiana Pacers	Los Angeles Stars	109–93
1970	Game 2	Indiana State Fairgrounds Coliseum	Indiana Pacers	Los Angeles Stars	114–111
1970	Game 5	Indiana State Fairgrounds Coliseum	Los Angeles Stars	Indiana Pacers	117–113
1972	Game 1	Indiana State Fairgrounds Coliseum	Indiana Pacers	New York Nets	124–103
1972	Game 2	Indiana State Fairgrounds Coliseum	New York Nets	Indiana Pacers	117–115
1972	Game 5	Indiana State Fairgrounds Coliseum	Indiana Pacers	New York Nets	100–99
1973	Game 3	Indiana State Fairgrounds Coliseum	Kentucky Colonels	Indiana Pacers	92–88
1973	Game 4	Indiana State Fairgrounds Coliseum	Indiana Pacers	Kentucky Colonels	90–86
1973	Game 6	Indiana State Fairgrounds Coliseum	Kentucky Colonels	Indiana Pacers	109–93
1975	Game 3	Market Square Arena	Kentucky Colonels	Indiana Pacers	109–101
1975	Game 4	Market Square Arena	Indiana Pacers	Kentucky Colonels	94–86

==== NBA Finals ====
Year	Game	Stadium	Winner	Loser	Score
2000	Game 3	Conseco Fieldhouse	Indiana Pacers	Los Angeles Lakers	100–91
2000	Game 4	Conseco Fieldhouse	Los Angeles Lakers	Indiana Pacers	120–118 (OT)
2000	Game 5	Conseco Fieldhouse	Indiana Pacers	Los Angeles Lakers	120–87
2025	Game 3	Gainbridge Fieldhouse	Indiana Pacers	Oklahoma City Thunder	116-107
2025	Game 4	Gainbridge Fieldhouse	Oklahoma City Thunder	Indiana Pacers	111-104
2025	Game 6	Gainbridge Fieldhouse	Indiana Pacers	Oklahoma City Thunder	108-91

=== WNBA Finals ===
In the same style as the NBA, the WNBA Finals are only hosted by Indianapolis when the local team, the Fever, make it to the championship round. This has occurred three times, in 2009, 2012, and 2015. The arena now known as Gainbridge Fieldhouse has been home to all of these events, hosting a total of six games. In each Finals, it hosted games 3 and 4. In 2012, the Fever won the championship in game 4 of the WNBA Finals, making it the first, and to date only, professional basketball championship to be clinched in Indianapolis.

Year	Game	Stadium	Winner	Loser	Score
2009	Game 3	Conseco Fieldhouse	Indiana Fever	Phoenix Mercury	86–85
2009	Game 4	Conseco Fieldhouse	Phoenix Mercury	Indiana Fever	90–77
2012	Game 3	Bankers Life Fieldhouse	Indiana Fever	Minnesota Lynx	76–59
2012	Game 4	Bankers Life Fieldhouse	**Indiana Fever**	Minnesota Lynx	87–78
2015	Game 3	Bankers Life Fieldhouse	Minnesota Lynx	Indiana Fever	80–77
2015	Game 4	Bankers Life Fieldhouse	Indiana Fever	Minnesota Lynx	75–69

Bold denotes a team that clinched the WNBA Championship with the conclusion of the game.

=== Pan American Games ===
Indianapolis also hosted the Pan American Games in 1987. Over 4,000 athletes from 38 nations participated in 30 sports at these games.

=== FIBA World Championships ===
Indianapolis hosted sixteen international basketball teams at the 2002 FIBA World Championship, which went from August 29 to September 8, 2002. This was the fourteenth edition of the event. It was the first, and to date only, time that the United States has hosted the event. The tournament consisted of 62 games. 25 games were held in the RCA Dome, while Conseco Fieldhouse hosted 37 games, including the championship game. The tournament culminated with the now defunct Yugoslavia national team winning the title, their second consecutive. Dirk Nowitzki of the German team was named the tournament MVP. Ironically, the American team, led by head coach George Karl, had their worst showing at the FIBA World Championships, finishing with a 6–3 record and a sixth-place overall finish.

=== Golf ===
Indianapolis has played host to many major golf tournaments. Crooked Stick Golf Club, located in the Indianapolis suburb of Carmel, Indiana, has hosted several events, most notably the 1991 PGA Championship, as well as the 1993 U.S. Women's Open, 2005 Solheim Cup, 2009 U.S. Senior Open, and the 2012 and 2016 BMW Championship. The Brickyard Crossing Course, partially contained within the Indianapolis Motor Speedway, hosted a PGA Tour event from 1960 to 1968, a Champions Tour event from 1994 to 2000, and an LPGA Tour event from 2017 to 2019. It also hosted one time LPGA Tour event in 1968. In the northern suburb of Westfield, The Club at Chatham Hills has hosted the LIV Golf Indianapolis tournament since 2025, serving as the final individual event of the season.

=== Mini-Marathon ===
Since 1977, Indianapolis has hosted a mini-marathon during the month of May, usually the first weekend of the month. It serves as a lead-up event for the Indianapolis 500. The event, currently called the OneAmerica 500 Festival Mini-Marathon, is the largest mini-marathon in America, and the seventh largest running event in the country. It is known for selling out the entire field on a regular basis, having sold out every spot since 2001. The 13.1 mile course starts in downtown Indianapolis, includes a lap around the Indianapolis Motor Speedway, and then ends with a return to downtown Indianapolis. Gary Romesser currently has the most wins at the event, having won the race in 1983, 1984, 1985, 1988, and 1991.

== Amateur sports ==
=== Indianapolis teams ===
- The Indianapolis Tornados are a Men's AAA minor league football team of the Premier Amateur Football League-Tier 1
- The Indiana Speed are a women's football team of Women's Football Alliance.
- The F. C. Indiana (NPSL) are a soccer team of the National Premier Soccer League.
- The Indianapolis Braves are a soccer team of the National Premier Soccer League.
- The F. C. Indiana (WPSL) are a soccer team of the WPSL Elite League.
- The Indianapolis Impalas are a Division 1 rugby team of USA Rugby.
- The Indy Eleven Women are a soccer team set to begin play in the USL W League inaugural season.

=== Ice hockey ===
The Indiana Ice played in the United States Hockey League, an amateur junior ice hockey league for players age 20 and younger. They played the majority of their home games at the Fairgrounds Coliseum, located in the Indiana State Fairgrounds in Indianapolis before going dormant after the 2013–14 season. Some of its home games were also played at Conseco Fieldhouse. The president of the Ice is Paul Skjodt. The Ice filled a hockey void left by the Indianapolis Ice franchise that existed from 1988 to 2004 when they relocated to Topeka.

=== Cricket ===
Cricket is a street-level sport among the South Asian communities that live in Indianapolis. Indianapolis mayor Greg Ballard identified the international appeal of cricket after his trip to South Africa, where he watched an Indian Premier League game that had been relocated to South Africa due to terrorist tensions in India during 2009 season. He initiated construction of the Indianapolis World Sports Park and its cricket stadium to make the city a global venue for cricket games. Cricket is a popular sport among Indian and South Asian communities and Ballard said that the city has a large enough South Asian community to start a cricket village. The plans for the stadium were started in 2009. Indianapolis has one club, Cricket Club of Indianapolis, that is registered with USACA. Multiple local amateur teams play with tennis balls in central Indiana, including ones in Bloomington, Carmel, Columbus, Fishers, Fort Wayne, Kokomo, West Lafayette, and also downtown at the IUPUI campus. Indiana (Youth) cricket (INYCA) with USYCA FREE cricket equipment and education program is expanding youth and school cricket in Indiana schools and colleges. Jatin Patel of USYCA and founder of the USA Center for Excellence in Cricket introduced the nation's first cricket coaching certification program for physical education teachers in Indiana schools during 2012. INYCA is targeting a future inter-school cricket tournament. The Indianapolis World Sports Park cricket ground is the home of the ICC Americas Cricket Combine – team to play in the WICB's Nagico Super50 and 2015 ICC Americas Twenty20 Division One.

=== Hurling ===
Hurling is a summer sport played among Irish communities in Indianapolis. Indianapolis Gaelic Athletic Association, formerly Indy Hurling Club, has been playing hurling in Indianapolis since 2002, and began competing on a national level in 2007. Indy GAA plays a summer co-ed hurling league, but also fields a team to compete in Gaelic Football and Camogie (female hurling) at the USGAA Championships every Labor Day weekend. Indy GAA has several national championships, and is sponsored by local businesses around the city.

=== Little League baseball and softball ===
Little League, founded in 1939 in Williamsport, Pennsylvania, opened its Central Region Headquarters in Indianapolis in 1989. Since 2011, the Little League Central Region Headquarters has hosted tournaments for the 11–12 age group to determine the Central Region representatives for the Little League Baseball World Series in Williamsport and the Little League Softball World Series in Portland, Oregon. The Reuben F. Glick Little League Center is located on 9802 E. Little League Drive in Indianapolis and provides operation support to the 13 states located within the Central Region.

== Defunct teams ==
- Indianapolis ABCs
- Indianapolis Athletics
- Indiana Blast
- Indiana Blaze
- Indianapolis Blues
- Indianapolis Capitals
- Indianapolis Capitols
- Indianapolis Checkers
- Indianapolis Chiefs
- Indianapolis Clowns
- Indianapolis Daredevils
- Indiana Firebirds
- Indianapolis Hoosiers (American Association)
- Indianapolis Hoosiers (National League)
- Indianapolis Hoosiers (Federal League)
- Indianapolis Ice
- Indianapolis Jets
- Indianapolis Olympians
- Indianapolis Racers
- Indiana Speed (WFA)
- Indiana Twisters

== See also ==
- Sports in Indiana
- List of baseball parks in Indianapolis
