= Nebraska Cornhuskers swimming and diving =

University of Nebraska–Lincoln swimming and diving team

- Founded: Men: 1921; 105 years ago Women: 1975; 51 years ago
- University: University of Nebraska–Lincoln
- Head coach: Pablo Morales (25th season)
- Conference: Big Ten Conference
- Location: Lincoln, Nebraska
- Home pool: Devaney Center Natatorium
- Nickname: Cornhuskers
- Colors: Scarlet and cream

Men's Conference Champions
- 1928, 1929, 1935, 1936, 1937, 1980, 1981, 1982, 1983, 1984, 1985, 1986, 1987, 1988, 1989, 1990, 1991, 1992, 1993, 1994

Women's Conference Champions
- 1985, 1986, 1987, 1990, 1991, 1994, 1995, 1996, 1997, 1998

The Nebraska Cornhuskers swimming and diving team competes as part of NCAA Division I, representing the University of Nebraska–Lincoln in the Big Ten Conference. Nebraska has hosted meets at the Devaney Center Natatorium since its construction in 1976. The team has been coached by Pablo Morales since 2001.

Nebraska sponsored a men's program from 1921 until 2001. The program was discontinued by athletic director Bill Byrne due to budgetary concerns, though it may have been hastened by a scholarship manipulation investigation that resulted in the suspension and eventual resignation of longtime head coach Cal Bentz. Under Bentz, future Olympic gold medalists Penelope Heyns and Adam Pine won NU's first NCAA Division I individual championships. Since 2001, the university has sponsored only a women's team.

== Conference affiliations ==
- Missouri Valley Intercollegiate Athletic Association / Big Eight Conference (1921–1996) (Note: In 1928, the ten member schools of the Missouri Valley Intercollegiate Athletic Association agreed to a splintering of the conference – Iowa State, Kansas, Kansas State, Missouri, Nebraska, and Oklahoma retained the MVIAA name and Drake, Grinnell, Oklahoma A&M (now Oklahoma State), and Washington University formed the Missouri Valley Conference. The MVIAA became commonly known as the Big Six, and later the Big Seven and Big Eight. Its name was officially changed to the Big Eight in 1964.)
- Big 12 Conference (1996–2011)
- Big Ten Conference (2011–present)

== Coaches ==
=== Men's coaching history ===
No.	Coach	Tenure (Note: Nebraska competed from 1925–26 to 1927–28 without a head coach, and did not field a team from 1942–43 to 1944–45 due to World War II.)	Overall (Note: Year-by-year men's results unavailable prior to 1928–29.)
1	F. W. Luehring	1921–1922	
2	Frank Adkins	1922–1924	
3	Frank Hunton	1924–1925	
4	Rudolph Vogeler	1928–1933	4–10 (.286)
5	Kenneth Sutherland	1933–1934	4–1 (.800)
6	Jack Minor	1934–1937	13–3 (.813)
7	Richard Hagelin	1937–1941	14–12 (.538)
8	Thomas Leeke	1941–1942	1–7 (.125)
9	Ed Higginbotham	1945–1946	1–3 (.250)
10	Hollie Lepley	1946–1952, 1953–1959	53–62–4 (.462)
11	Warren Emery	1952–1953	2–5 (.286)
12	Dick Klaas	1959–1961, 1963–1966	29–31 (.483)
13	John Reta	1966–1978	30–67 (.309)
14	Cal Bentz	1961–1963, (Note: Cal Bentz served as interim head coach during the 1961–62 and 1962–63 seasons.) 1978–2000	169–90 (.653)
	Paul Nelsen	2000–2001 (Note: Paul Nelsen served as interim head coach during the 2000–01 season.)	6–4 (.600)

=== Women's coaching history ===
No.	Coach	Tenure	Overall
1	Pat Sullivan	1975–1976	7–0 (1.000)
2	Ray Huppert	1976–1992	116–56 (.674)
3	Cal Bentz	1992–2000	44–22 (.667)
	Paul Nelsen	2000–2001	7–4 (.636)
4	Pablo Morales	2001–present	136–71–1 (.656)

=== Coaching staff ===
Name	Position	First year	Alma mater
Pablo Morales	Head coach	2001	Stanford
Patrick Rowan	Associate head coach	2012	Eastern Michigan
Ford McLiney	Head diving coach	2026	Texas A&M

== Venues ==
Nebraska has hosted meets at the Bob Devaney Sports Center Natatorium since the facility was constructed in 1976. The venue hosted several Big Eight and Big 12 conference meets in the decades following its construction, but more recently has been criticized as out-of-date. Its pool is undersized at just twenty-five yards and is considered among the worst in the Big Ten.

== Championships and awards ==
=== Team conference championships ===
Men's

- MVIAA / Big Eight: 1928, 1929, 1935, 1936, 1937, 1980, 1981, 1982, 1983, 1984, 1985, 1986, 1987, 1988, 1989, 1990, 1991, 1992, 1993, 1994

Women's

- Big Eight: 1985, 1986, 1987, 1990, 1991, 1994, 1995, 1996
- Big 12: 1997, 1998

=== NCAA champions ===
- Penelope Heyns – 1996 (100-yard breaststroke)
- Adam Pine – 2000 (100-yard butterfly)

=== Men's All-Americans ===
Sixty-three Nebraska men's swimmers and divers earned a total of 226 All-America honors.

- Richard Hagelin – 1935 (1 event)
- Marvin Grimm – 1947 (2 events)
- Ed Craren – 1950 (2 events), 1951 (2 events)
- Dave Frank – 1966 (1 event)
- Rich Gordon – 1966 (1 event)
- Keefe Lodwig – 1966 (3 events)
- Tom Nickerson – 1966 (1 event)
- Steve Sorensen – 1966 (1 event)
- David Keane – 1981 (1 event)
- Cliff Looschen – 1982 (1 event), 1983 (2 events)
- Tim Brinner – 1983 (1 event), 1986 (1 event)
- Dave Goodwin – 1983 (1 event)
- Jim Korff – 1983 (1 event)
- Earl Welliver – 1983 (1 event)
- Reynaldo Castro – 1984 (1 event)
- Doug Hubner – 1986 (1 event), 1987 (1 event)
- Ed Jowdy – 1986 (1 event), 1988 (1 event)
- Dan Novinski – 1986 (1 event), 1987 (1 event), 1988 (2 events), 1989 (3 events)
- Ed Ognibene – 1986 (2 events), 1988 (1 event)
- Sean Frampton – 1987 (1 event), 1988 (2 event), 1989 (1 event), 1990 (2 event)
- Mike Irvin – 1987 (3 events), 1988 (4 event), 1989 (3 events)
- Kollin Kostboth – 1987 (1 event)
- Wes Zimmerman – 1987 (1 event)
- Ryan Bell – 1988 (1 event), 1989 (2 events), 1990 (2 events), 1991 (1 event)
- Rick Havekost – 1988 (1 event), 1989 (1 event)
- Lewis Meyers – 1988 (2 events), 1989 (3 events)
- Ed Rief – 1988 (1 event)
- Lawrence Roddick – 1988 (3 events), 1989 (2 events)
- Peter Williams – 1988 (4 events), 1989 (5 events), 1990 (5 events)
- Bob Fitzpatrick – 1989 (1 event), 1990 (1 event)
- Mark Nieuwenhuis – 1989 (2 events)
- Jan Bidrman – 1990 (3 events)
- Seddon Keyter – 1990 (3 events), 1991 (1 event)
- Nate Kinney – 1990 (1 event), 1991 (1 event)
- Rhett Talbert – 1990 (2 events)
- Jan Karlsson – 1991 (1 event)
- Jonathan Kerr – 1991 (1 event), 1994 (1 event)
- William Campbell – 1992 (2 events)
- Kevin McMahon – 1992 (1 event), 1993 (1 event)
- Gary Albertyn – 1993 (1 event)
- Francois Boshoff – 1993 (2 events), 1995 (2 events), 1996 (2 events)
- Justin Finney – 1993 (2 events)
- Allan Kelsey – 1993 (4 events)
- Laren Tiltmann – 1993 (1 event)
- Juan Benavides – 1995 (2 events), 1996 (3 events), 1997 (4 events)
- Rodney Johnston – 1995 (2 events)
- Alex Schleifman – 1995 (2 events), 1996 (2 events), 1997 (1 event), 1998 (2 events)
- Mark Bennett – 1996 (2 events), 1997 (3 events), 1998 (4 events)
- Adrian Costello – 1996 (1 event)
- Josh Mathias – 1996 (1 event), 1997 (2 events), 1999 (3 events)
- Travis Niemeyer – 1996 (2 events)
- Danny Bergman – 1997 (2 events), 1998 (2 events), 1999 (2 events)
- David Foster – 1997 (1 event), 1998 (3 events), 1999 (2 events)
- Valērijs Kalmikovs – 1997 (1 event), 1998 (2 events), 1999 (3 events), 2000 (1 event)
- Adam Pine – 1997 (5 events), 1998 (5 events), 1999 (5 events), 2000 (4 events)
- Keith Ebbert – 1998 (1 event)
- Bert Locklin – 1998 (1 event)
- Michael Windisch – 1998 (2 events), 1999 (3 events), 2000 (3 events)
- Javier Botello – 1999 (2 events), 2000 (3 events)
- Erik Castro – 1999 (2 events), 2000 (1 event)
- Anthony Rogis – 1999 (4 events), 2000 (3 events)
- Peter Fry – 2000 (2 events)
- Erik Wiken – 2000 (1 event)

=== Women's All-Americans ===
Sixty-four Nebraska women's swimmers and divers have earned a total of 254 All-America honors.

- Sherri Hayward – 1980 (1 event), 1981 (1 event), 1982 (2 events)
- Shauna Gilmore – 1985 (3 events), 1986 (1 event), 1987 (4 events)
- Cindy Hampel – 1985 (2 events), 1986 (1 event)
- Erin Hurley – 1985 (4 events), 1986 (1 event), 1987 (3 events), 1988 (1 event)
- Kenya Kelly – 1985 (2 events)
- Dana Powers – 1985 (5 events), 1986 (1 event), 1987 (4 events)
- Emily Ricketts – 1985 (4 events)
- Linda Sebesta – 1985 (3 events)
- Penny Stanek – 1985 (2 events)
- Lorie Kappenman – 1986 (1 event), 1987 (1 event)
- Heidi Hecker – 1987 (1 event)
- Carole Johnson – 1987 (3 events), 1988 (1 event), 1989 (1 event)
- Amy Aarsen – 1988 (1 event), 1990 (1 event), 1991 (1 event)
- Allison Barker – 1988 (1 event)
- Mindy Matheny – 1988 (1 event), 1989 (1 event), 1991 (1 event)
- Jenell Garcia – 1989 (1 event), 1990 (1 event), 1991 (1 event)
- Julie May – 1989 (1 event)
- Kristen Neuenfeldt – 1989 (1 event)
- Lynne Braddock – 1991 (1 event)
- Christine Frederick – 1991 (1 event), 1993 (2 events)
- Chris Gmeiner – 1991 (1 event)
- Melanie Wirtner – 1991 (1 event)
- Michelle Butcher – 1992 (1 event)
- Melanie Dodd – 1993 (5 events), 1995 (6 events), 1996 (4 events)
- Jane Glazebrook – 1993 (2 events), 1994 (2 events), 1995 (3 events)
- Penelope Heyns – 1993 (2 events), 1994 (5 events), 1995 (4 events), 1996 (4 events)
- Marci Bodner – 1994 (1 event)
- Heather Ericksen – 1994 (3 events)
- Katie Lullen – 1994 (1 event)
- Lezelle Markgraaff – 1994 (1 event)
- Heather Park – 1994 (1 event), 1995 (1 event), 1996 (1 event)
- Julia Russell – 1994 (4 events), 1995 (2 events), 1996 (7 events), 1997 (5 events)
- Brianna Wilkins – 1994 (1 event), 1995 (1 event), 1996 (1 event), 1997 (1 event)
- Erin Carew – 1995 (2 events), 1996 (2 events)
- Cathy Crooks – 1995 (3 events)
- Destiny Lauren – 1995 (3 events), 1996 (3 events), 1998 (1 event), 1999 (1 event)
- Janet Danburg – 1996 (2 events), 1997 (1 event)
- Mandy Hunter-Beckinsall – 1996 (2 events)
- Shannon Wright – 1996 (1 event), 1997 (1 event)
- Sara Jowsey – 1997 (1 event)
- Sara Kate Havens – 1997 (1 event)
- Beth Karaica – 1997 (4 events), 1998 (3 events), 1999 (2 events)
- Lenka Manhalova – 1997 (1 event), 1998 (1 event)
- Terrie Miller – 1997 (1 event), 1998 (1 event), 1999 (1 event)
- Helene Muller – 1997 (4 events), 1998 (5 events), 1999 (3 events), 2000 (3 events)
- Stacey Sedlacek – 1997 (1 event), 1999 (2 events)
- Lauren Simon – 1997 (1 event)
- Anna Windsor – 1997 (5 events), 1998 (5 events)
- Therese Alshammar – 1998 (7 events), 1999 (6 events)
- Shandra Johnson – 1998 (1 event), 1999 (5 events), 2000 (3 events)
- Emma Johnson – 1999 (2 events)
- Elvira Fischer – 2000 (1 event), 2001 (2 events)
- Lindsey Highstrom – 2000 (1 event)
- Sasha Pine – 2000 (1 event)
- Carmen Cosgrove – 2001 (1 event)
- Rebecca Wolfe – 2001 (1 event)
- Lauren Bailey – 2006 (1 event)
- Anna Filipcic – 2016 (1 event)
- Abi Knapton – 2017 (1 event), 2018 (1 event), 2019 (2 events), 2021 (2 events)
- Audrey Coffey – 2020 (1 event)
- Madison Coughlen – 2020 (1 event)
- Autumn Haebig – 2020 (1 event), 2021 (2 events)
- Sara Troyer – 2020 (2 events)
- Gena Jorgenson – 2024 (1 event), 2025 (1 event)

== Women's seasons ==
Conference tournament champion

Year	Coach	Overall	Conference tournament	Postseason (Note: The first NCAA Division I championship was held in 1982.)
Big Eight Conference (1976–1996)
1975–76	Pat Sullivan	7–0	2nd	
1976–77	Ray Huppert	5–2	2nd	
1977–78	Ray Huppert	5–1	3rd	
1978–79	Ray Huppert	5–2	3rd	
1979–80	Ray Huppert	6–6	3rd	
1980–81	Ray Huppert	3–9	5th	
1981–82	Ray Huppert	6–5	2nd	NCAA Division I T–20th
1982–83	Ray Huppert	8–3	2nd	
1983–84	Ray Huppert	10–4	2nd	
1984–85	Ray Huppert	8–2	1st	NCAA Division I 9th
1985–86	Ray Huppert	10–2	1st	NCAA Division I 30th
1986–87	Ray Huppert	11–2	1st	NCAA Division I 19th
1987–88	Ray Huppert	7–2	2nd	NCAA Division I 39th
1988–89	Ray Huppert	6–7	2nd	NCAA Division I 29th
1989–90	Ray Huppert	11–3	1st	NCAA Division I 39th
1990–91	Ray Huppert	7–3	1st	NCAA Division I 28th
1991–92	Ray Huppert	8–3	2nd	NCAA Division I 31st
1992–93	Cal Bentz	6–2	2nd	NCAA Division I 20th
1993–94	Cal Bentz	7–1	1st	NCAA Division I 16th
1994–95	Cal Bentz	4–3	1st	NCAA Division I 9th
1995–96	Cal Bentz	5–3	1st	NCAA Division I 10th
Big 12 Conference (1996–2011)
1996–97	Cal Bentz	6–2	1st	NCAA Division I 8th
1997–98	Cal Bentz	7–0	1st	NCAA Division I 11th
1998–99	Cal Bentz	7–3	2nd	NCAA Division I 12th
1999–00	Cal Bentz	2–8	3rd	NCAA Division I 20th
2000–01	Paul Nelsen	7–4	3rd	NCAA Division I 23rd
2001–02	Pablo Morales	0–3	6th	
2002–03	Pablo Morales	3–8	6th	
2003–04	Pablo Morales	7–2	4th	
2004–05	Pablo Morales	8–1	3rd	
2005–06	Pablo Morales	7–2	4th	NCAA Division I 36th
2006–07	Pablo Morales	7–6	5th	
2007–08	Pablo Morales	7–2	6th	
2008–09	Pablo Morales	3–4	6th	
2009–10	Pablo Morales	4–4	6th	
2010–11	Pablo Morales	6–4	5th	
Big Ten Conference (2011–present)
2011–12	Pablo Morales	3–2	11th	
2012–13	Pablo Morales	12–3	9th	
2013–14	Pablo Morales	4–2–1	9th	
2014–15	Pablo Morales	4–6	9th	
2015–16	Pablo Morales	5–3	9th	NCAA Division I 39th
2016–17	Pablo Morales	6–0	10th	NCAA Division I 33rd
2017–18	Pablo Morales	4–3	10th	NCAA Division I 35th
2018–19	Pablo Morales	5–1	8th	NCAA Division I 33rd
2019–20	Pablo Morales	5–2	10th	NCAA Division I (Note: Four Nebraska athletes qualified for the 2020 NCAA Division I Championship before it was canceled due to the COVID-19 pandemic.)
2020–21	Pablo Morales	1–3	7th	NCAA Division I 26th
2021–22	Pablo Morales	7–1	9th	
2022–23	Pablo Morales	6–3	10th	
2023–24	Pablo Morales	7–2	8th	NCAA Division I 30th
2024–25	Pablo Morales	8–2	10th	NCAA Division I 34th
2025–26	Pablo Morales	7–2	10th	NCAA Division I 27th

== Olympians ==
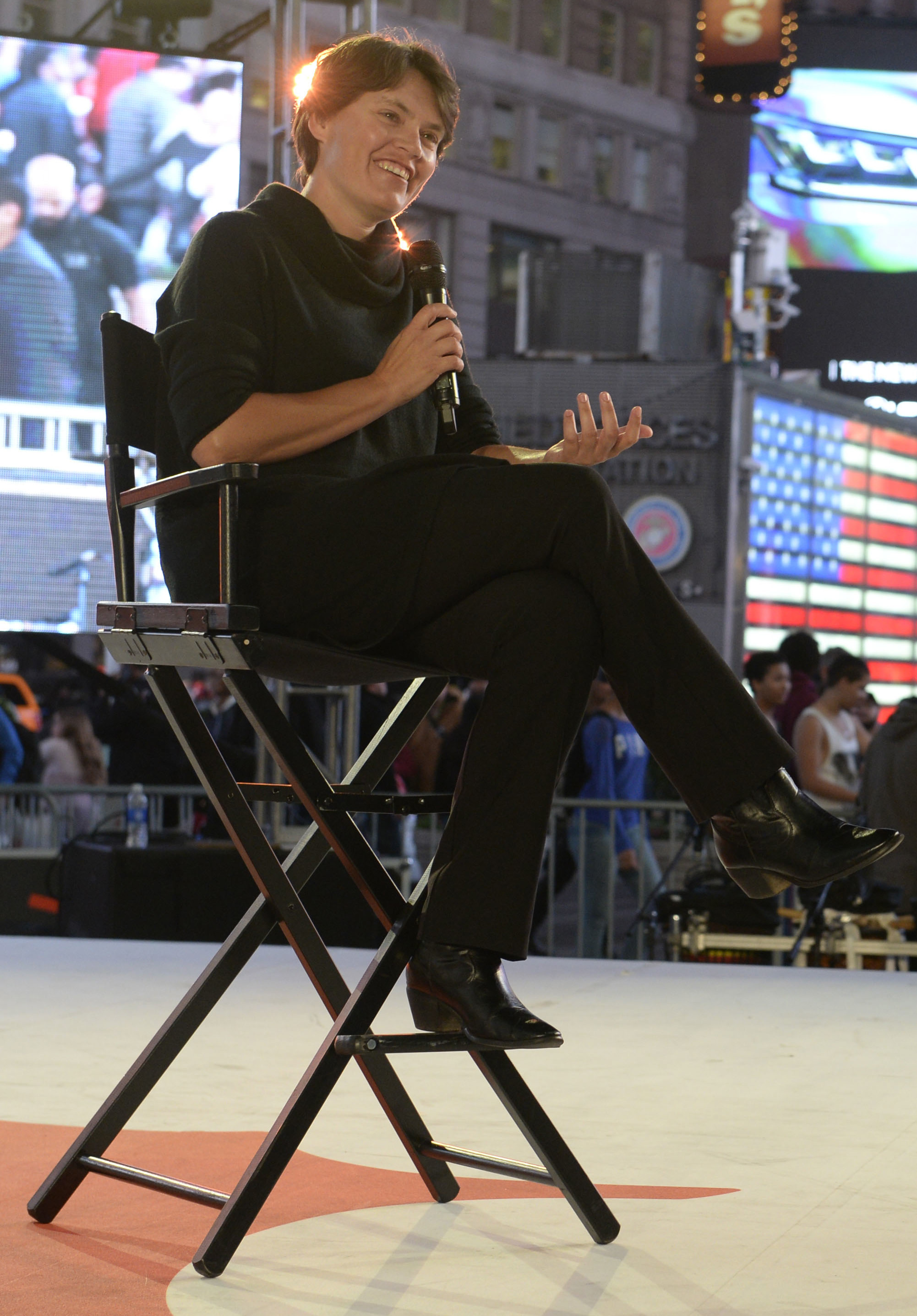
Penelope Heyns is the only Nebraska athlete to win multiple Olympic gold medals

Twenty-five Nebraska swimmers and divers have combined to compete or coach in forty-five Olympiads. South African swimmer Penelope Heyns – the only Cornhusker in any sport with multiple gold medals – is the only woman to ever win the 100- and 200-meter breaststroke events at the same Olympic Games.

Olympiad	City	Athlete	Country	Medal(s)
1976 (XXI)	(Canada) Montreal	John Ebito	Nigeria (Note: Nigeria boycotted the 1976 Summer Olympics.)	
1976 (XXI)	(Canada) Montreal	Bengt Jönsson	Sweden	
1980 (XXII)	(Soviet Union) Moscow	Reynaldo Castro	Dominican Republic	
1980 (XXII)	(Soviet Union) Moscow	John Ebito	Nigeria	
1984 (XXIII)	(United States) Los Angeles	Reynaldo Castro	Dominican Republic	
1988 (XXIV)	(South Korea) Seoul	Wendy Lucero	United States	
1992 (XXV)	(Spain) Barcelona	Jan Bidrman	Sweden	
1992 (XXV)	(Spain) Barcelona	Roberto Bonilla	Guatemala	
1992 (XXV)	(Spain) Barcelona	Penelope Heyns	South Africa	
1992 (XXV)	(Spain) Barcelona	Seddon Keyter	South Africa	
1992 (XXV)	(Spain) Barcelona	Peter Williams	South Africa	
1992 (XXV)	(Spain) Barcelona	Anja Margetić	Independent	
1996 (XXVI)	(United States) Atlanta	Therese Alshammar	Sweden	
1996 (XXVI)	(United States) Atlanta	Juan Benavides	Spain	
1996 (XXVI)	(United States) Atlanta	Roberto Bonilla	Guatemala	
1996 (XXVI)	(United States) Atlanta	Penelope Heyns	South Africa	(gold) 100 m breaststroke (gold) 200 m breaststroke
1996 (XXVI)	(United States) Atlanta	Helene Muller	South Africa	
1996 (XXVI)	(United States) Atlanta	Julia Russell	South Africa	
1996 (XXVI)	(United States) Atlanta	Jan Bidrman (coach)	South Africa	
1996 (XXVI)	(United States) Atlanta	José Isaza	Panama	
1996 (XXVI)	(United States) Atlanta	Emma Johnson	Australia	(bronze) 4 x 200 m freestyle relay
1996 (XXVI)	(United States) Atlanta	Anna Windsor	Australia	
1996 (XXVI)	(United States) Atlanta	Valērijs Kalmikovs	Latvia	
1996 (XXVI)	(United States) Atlanta	Lenka Maňhalová	Czech Republic	
1996 (XXVI)	(United States) Atlanta	Terrie Miller	Norway	
2000 (XXVII)	(Australia) Sydney	Therese Alshammar	Sweden	(silver) 50 m freestyle (silver) 100 m freestyle (bronze) 4 x 100 m freestyle relay
2000 (XXVII)	(Australia) Sydney	Juan Benavides	Spain	
2000 (XXVII)	(Australia) Sydney	Javier Botello	Spain	
2000 (XXVII)	(Australia) Sydney	Elvira Fischer	Austria	
2000 (XXVII)	(Australia) Sydney	Michael Windisch	Austria	
2000 (XXVII)	(Australia) Sydney	Penelope Heyns	South Africa	(bronze) 100 m breaststroke
2000 (XXVII)	(Australia) Sydney	Helene Muller	South Africa	
2000 (XXVII)	(Australia) Sydney	Valērijs Kalmikovs	Latvia	
2000 (XXVII)	(Australia) Sydney	Adam Pine	Australia	(gold) 4 x 100 m freestyle relay (silver) 4 x 100 m medley relay
2000 (XXVII)	(Australia) Sydney	Jan Bidrman (coach)	Canada	
2004 (XXVIII)	(Greece) Athens	Therese Alshammar	Sweden	
2004 (XXVIII)	(Greece) Athens	Adam Pine	Australia	
2004 (XXVIII)	(Greece) Athens	Jan Bidrman (coach)	Canada	
2008 (XXIX)	(China) Beijing	Therese Alshammar	Sweden	
2008 (XXIX)	(China) Beijing	Adam Pine	Australia	(silver) 4 x 100 m medley relay
2008 (XXIX)	(China) Beijing	Jan Bidrman (coach)	Canada	
2012 (XXX)	(United Kingdom) London	Therese Alshammar	Sweden	
2012 (XXX)	(United Kingdom) London	Jan Bidrman (coach)	Canada	
2016 (XXXI)	(Brazil) Rio de Janeiro	Therese Alshammar	Sweden	
2020 (XXXII)	(Japan) Tokyo	Beatriz Padron	Costa Rica	
