= 2002 NCAA Division I Men's Swimming and Diving Championships =

American college aquatic sports competition

2002 NCAA Division I Swimming and Diving Championships
- Host city: (Georgia (U.S. state)) Athens, Georgia
- Date: March 2002
- Venue(s): Gabrielsen Natatorium; University of Georgia

The 2002 NCAA Division I Men's Swimming and Diving Championships were contested in March 2002 at Gabrielsen Natatorium at the University of Georgia in Athens, Georgia at the 79th annual NCAA-sanctioned swim meet to determine the team and individual national champions of Division I men's collegiate swimming and diving in the United States.

Texas once again topped the team standings, finishing just 11 points ahead of Stanford. It was the Longhorns' third consecutive and ninth overall national title.

== Team standings ==
- Note: Top 10 only
- (H) = Hosts
- ^{(DC)} = Defending champions
- Full results

Rank	Team	Points
1st place, gold medalist(s)	Texas ^{(DC)}	512
2nd place, silver medalist(s)	Stanford	501
3rd place, bronze medalist(s)	Auburn	365 1/2
4	Florida	277
5	USC	272
6	California	271
7	Arizona	242
8	Minnesota	216
9	Michigan	183
10	Georgia (H)	167

== Swimming results ==
Event	Gold		Silver		Bronze	
50 freestyle	Roland Schoeman; Arizona	19.08	Anthony Ervin; California	19.10	Randall Bal; Stanford	19.48
100 freestyle	Anthony Ervin; California	41.62; US, AR	Duje Draganja; California	42.22	Roland Schoeman; Arizona	42.80
200 freestyle	Stephen Sioui; Arizona	1:34.67	Dan Ketchum; Michigan	1:34.76	Klete Keller; USC	1:35.42
500 freestyle	Klete Keller; USC	4:12.83	Erik Vendt; USC	4:13.99	John Cole; Harvard	4:16.91
1650 freestyle	Erik Vendt; USC	14:37.48	John Cole; Harvard	14:39.71	Justin Mortimer; Minnesota	14:50.57
100 backstroke	Peter Marshall; Stanford	45.91	Alex Lim; California	46.05	Randall Bal; Stanford	46.13
200 backstroke	Markus Rogan; Stanford	1:41.14	Peter Marshall; Stanford	1:41.85	Kirk Hampleman; Auburn	1:42.57
100 breaststroke	Brendan Hansen; Texas	52.47	Pat Calhoun; Auburn	52.72	Jeff Hackler; Minnesota	53.24
200 breaststroke	Brendan Hansen; Texas	1:52.88; US, AR	Michael Bruce; Stanford	1:54.81	Kyle Salyards; Georgia	1:55.67
100 butterfly	Ian Crocker; Texas	45.44; US, AR	Peter Marshall; Stanford	46.48	Roland Schoeman; Arizona	46.50
200 butterfly	Ioan Gherghel; Alabama	1:42.68	Jeff Lee; USC	1:42.94	Rainer Kendrick; Texas	1:43.56
200 IM	Markus Rogan; Stanford	1:44.03	Dan Trupin; Stanford	1:44.08	Tamás Kerékjártó; USC	1:45.56
400 IM	Erik Vendt; USC	3:40.65	Robert Margalis; Georgia	3:41.42	Kevin Clements; Auburn	3:43.19
200 freestyle relay	Stanford; Randall Bal (19.52); Peter Marshall (18.74); Andrew Schnell (19.29); Bobby O'Bryan (18.94)	1:16.49; US, AR	California; Anthony Ervin (19.05) =US, =AR; Mattias Ohlin (19.68); Matt Macedo (19.16); Duje Draganja (19.00)	1:16.89	Arizona; Roland Schoeman (19.19); Eric la Fleur (19.35); Tyler Johnson (19.35); Byron Jeffers (19.10)	1:16.99
400 freestyle relay	California; Duje Draganja (43.15); Anthony Ervin (41.43); Mattias Ohlin (42.44); Matt Macedo (42.99)	2:50.01	Stanford; Randall Bal (43.15); Peter Marshall (42.64); Bobby O'Bryan (43.01); Andrew Schnell (42.83)	2:51.63	Texas; Chris Kemp (43.54); Tommy Hannan (43.40); Ryan Ciccarelli (43.73); Ian Crocker (42.06)	2:52.73
800 freestyle relay	USC; Jeff Lee (1:35.30); Rodrigo Castro (1:34.68); Tamás Kerékjártó (1:35.22); Klete Keller (1:32.15)	6:17.35; US	Texas; Chris Kemp (1:35.67); Rainer Kendrick (1:36.71); John Suchand (1:36.67); Ian Crocker (1:34.73)	6:23.78	Michigan; Garrett Mangieri (1:36.78); Brendan Neligan (1:38.03); Andrew Hurd (1:37.12); Dan Ketchum (1:33.79)	6:25.72
200 medley relay	Stanford; Randall Bal (21.46); Michael Bruce (24.37); Matthew MacDonald (20.60); Peter Marshall (19.04)	1:25.47	Texas; Tommy Hannan (22.02); Brendan Hansen (23.96); Daniel DiToro (20.66); Ian Crocker (19.16)	1:25.80	Minnesota; Todd Smolinski (21.35); Jeff Hackler (24.05); Björn Lundin (21.19); Terry Silkaitis (19.28)	1:15.87
400 medley relay	Stanford; Peter Marshall (45.87); Michael Bruce (52.53); Dan Westcott (46.09); Randall Bal (42.32)	3:06.81	Texas; Tommy Hannan (47.21); Brendan Hansen (51.61); Ian Crocker (45.49); Chris Kemp (42.59)	3:06.93	Minnesota; Todd Smolinski (46.85); Jeff Hackler (52.68); Chad Krastins (47.45); Terry Silkaitis (42.75)	3:09.73

Legend: US – U.S. Open record; AR – American record;

== Diving results ==
Event	Gold		Silver		Bronze	
1 m diving	Troy Dumais; Texas	390.35	Clayton Moss; Kentucky	379.90	Phillip Jones; Tennessee	366.85
3 m diving	Troy Dumais; Texas	673.80	Imre Lengyel; Miami	624.30	Phillip Jones; Tennessee	623.15
Platform diving	Imre Lengyel; Miami	620.25	Justin Dumais; Texas	577.15	Matt Bricker; Auburn	565.85

== See also ==
- List of college swimming and diving teams
