= 1983 NCAA Division I Men's Swimming and Diving Championships =

American college aquatic sports competition

1983 NCAA Division I Swimming and Diving Championships
- Host city: Indianapolis, Indiana
- Date(s): March 1983
- Venue(s): Indiana University Natatorium

The 1983 NCAA Division I Men's Swimming and Diving Championships were contested in March 1983 at the Indiana University Natatorium in Indianapolis, Indiana at the 60th annual NCAA-sanctioned swim meet to determine the team and individual national champions of Division I men's collegiate swimming and diving in the United States. The men's and women's titles would not be held at the same site until 2006.

Florida topped the team standings for the first time, the Gators' first men's title.

== Team standings ==
- Note: Top 10 only
- (H) = Hosts
- ^{(DC)} = Defending champions
- Full results

| Rank | Team | Points |
|---|---|---|
| 1st place, gold medalist(s) | Florida | 238 |
| 2nd place, silver medalist(s) | SMU | 227 |
| 3rd place, bronze medalist(s) | Texas | 225 |
| 4 | Stanford | 170 |
| 5 | Alabama | 157 1/2 |
| 6 | UCLA ^{(DC)} | 152 |
| 7 | Arizona State | 141 1/2 |
| 8 | California | 101 1/2 |
| 9 | Auburn | 78 1/2 |
| 10 | Ohio State | 57 |

== See also ==
- List of college swimming and diving teams
