= 1986 NCAA Division I men's swimming and diving championships =

American college aquatic sports competition

1986 NCAA Division I Swimming and Diving Championships
- Host city: Indianapolis, Indiana
- Date(s): March 1986
- Venue(s): Indiana University Natatorium; Indiana University

The 1986 NCAA Division I Men's Swimming and Diving Championships were contested in March 1986 at the Indiana University Natatorium in Indianapolis, Indiana at the 63rd annual NCAA-sanctioned swim meet to determine the team and individual national champions of Division I men's collegiate swimming and diving in the United States. The men's and women's titles would not be held at the same site until 2006.

Stanford again topped the team standings, the Cardinal's second consecutive and third overall men's title.

== Team standings ==
- Note: Top 10 only
- (H) = Hosts
- ^{(DC)} = Defending champions
- Full results

Rank	Team	Points
1st place, gold medalist(s)	Stanford ^{(DC)}	404
2nd place, silver medalist(s)	California	335
3rd place, bronze medalist(s)	Texas	325 1/2
4	Florida	321
5	UCLA	288
6	SMU	169
7	USC	160
8	Alabama	136
9	Arizona State	120
10	Arizona	105

== See also ==
- List of college swimming and diving teams
