= 1981 NCAA Division I Swimming and Diving Championships =

American college aquatic sports competition

- Host city: Austin, Texas
- Date(s): March 1981
- Venue(s): Texas Swimming Center; University of Texas at Austin

The 1981 NCAA Men's Division I Swimming and Diving Championships were contested in March 1981 at the Texas Swimming Center at the University of Texas at Austin in Austin, Texas at the 58th annual NCAA-sanctioned swim meet to determine the team and individual national champions of Division I men's collegiate swimming and diving in the United States.

Hosts Texas topped the team standings for the first time, the Longhorns' inaugural national title.

This was the final year before the inaugural NCAA Women's Division I Swimming and Diving Championships, although the men's and women's titles would not be held at the same site until 2006.

== Team standings ==
- Note: Top 10 only
- (H) = Hosts
- ^{(DC)} = Defending champions
- Full results

Rank	Team	Points
1st place, gold medalist(s)	Texas (H)	259
2nd place, silver medalist(s)	UCLA	189
3rd place, bronze medalist(s)	Florida	180
4	SMU	161
5	Auburn	146
6	California ^{(DC)}	140
7	USC	134
8	Alabama	116
9	Stanford	84
10	Iowa	74

== See also ==
- List of college swimming and diving teams
