= Indiana University Natatorium =

Natatorium in Indianapolis, Indiana, US

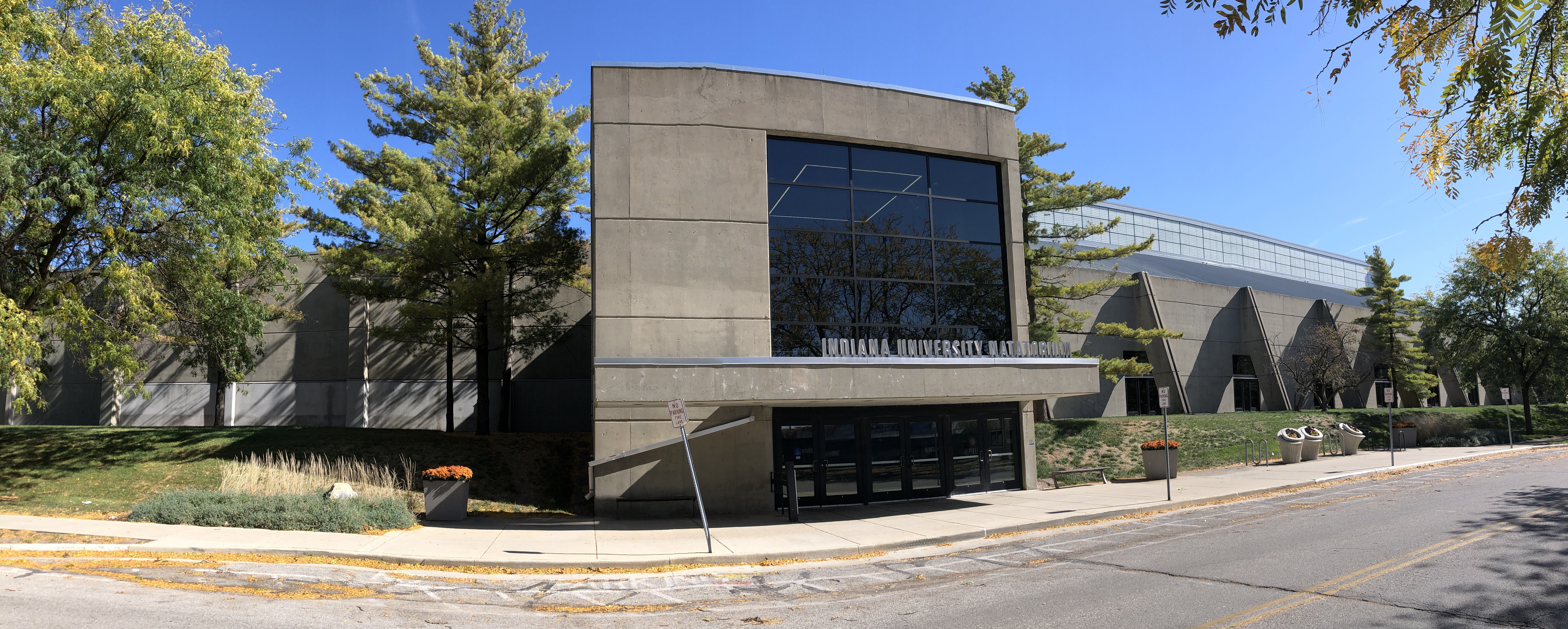
- Indiana University Natatorium in 2022
- Interactive map of Indiana University Natatorium
- Full name: Indiana University Natatorium
- Address: Indianapolis, Indiana, United States
- Coordinates: 39°46′14″N 86°10′30″W
- Capacity: 4,700 (Competition pool)

Construction
- Built: 1982
- Opened: 1982
- Architects: Browning, Day, Pollack & Mullins, Inc. Edward Larabee Barnes, Architects

Tenant
- IU Indy Jaguars (NCAA)

Indiana University Natatorium is a swimming complex on the campus of Indiana University Indianapolis in Indianapolis, Indiana, United States. When the university was part of Indiana University-Purdue University Indianapolis, the Natatorium also served as the home of the School of Health & Human Sciences, including physical education, tourism management, pre-physical and pre-occupational therapy, with its offices on the second level and the Polaris Fitness Center on the first level. The Human Performance Lab is housed in the Natatorium's basement.

The Natatorium has hosted hundreds of high level swimming and diving events, including the NCAA Division I Men's Swimming and Diving Championships, NCAA Division I Women's Swimming and Diving Championships, Big Ten Conference Swimming & Diving Championships, Big East Conference Swimming & Diving Championships, USA Swimming, USA Diving, and USA Synchronized Swimming Championships, local/regional meets, as well 11 Olympic Trials in swimming, diving, and synchronized swimming.

The Natatorium has the largest seating capacity of any indoor pool in the United States; it can hold up to 4,700 spectators.

== Competition pool ==
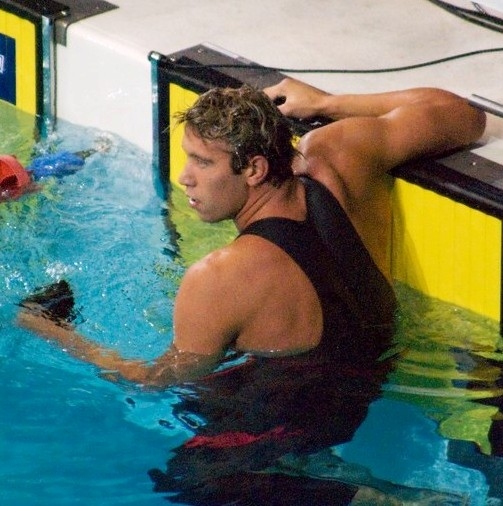
American swimmer Matt Grevers at the Indiana University Natatorium

The Natatorium's main competition pool is 50-meters with eight racing lanes. Two moveable bulkheads allow for long or short course events as well as hosting water polo and synchronized swimming. The seating capacity of the Natatorium is 4,700, making it the largest indoor pool in the United States. There is also room for additional seating of 1,500 on deck. The depth of the pool is 9 feet (2.7 m) at the ends and 10 feet (3.0 m) at the center of pool. Water temperature is kept at 79 °F (26 °C). The main pool contains six underwater windows for television and coaching analysis. There are approximately 1,000,000 US gallons (3,800,000 L; 830,000 imp gal) of water in the main pool. More than 100 American records and 15 world records have been set in the pool.

== Diving well ==
The diving well of the Natatorium has hosted many local and national diving events, including the 2008 Olympic trials. The diving well has a depth of over 17 feet (5.2 m) and holds more than 450,000 US gallons (1,700,000 L; 370,000 imp gal) of water. It has four 1-meter and four 3-meter boards and five diving platforms of 1, 3, 5, 7.5, and 10 meters in height. The pool is kept at approximately 86 °F (30 °C). There are also two underwater windows for television coverage and coaching analysis.

== History ==
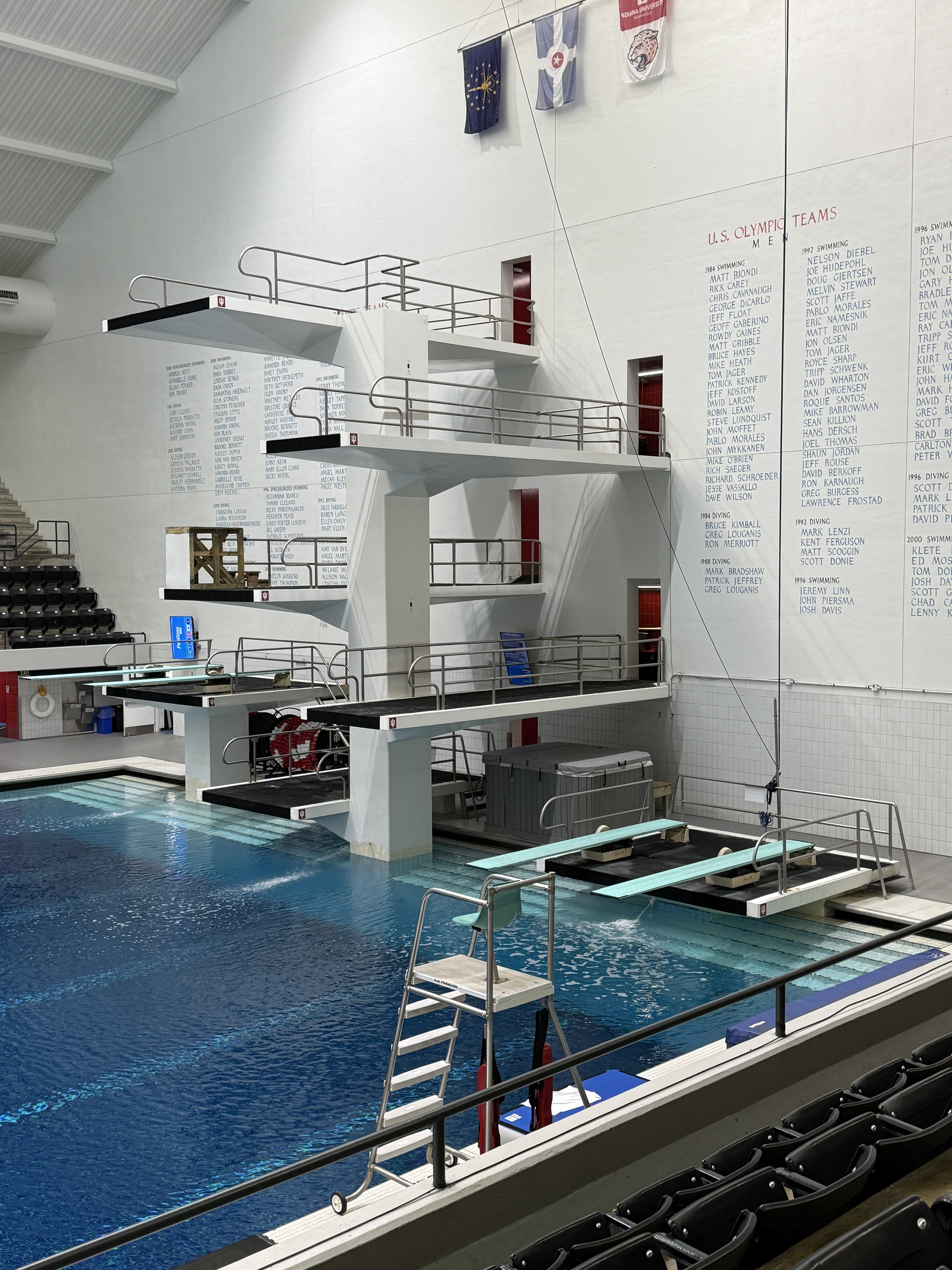
The diving tower at the natatorium

The Natatorium was completed in 1982. Counsilman-Hunsaker served as the design consultant for the project. The architects were Browning, Day, Pollack & Mullins, Inc. and Edward Larabee Barnes, Architects. The construction project received funding from Lilly Endowment Inc., and Krannert Charitable Trust. Hugh J. Baker and Company, fabricator of reinforcing steel and concrete, created the structural supports used in the Natatorium construction. The construction was completed in the summer of 1982 alongside the Michael A. Carroll Track & Field Stadium leading into the National Sports Festival. The project cost a total of $21.5 million. The F.A. Nihelm Company was contracted to build the three pools; a 76-foot by 56-foot diving pool, a 50-meter 8-lane competition pool, and a 6-lane instructional pool. The IU School of Physical Education, now known as the School of Health and Human Sciences, moved into the facility following its completion. The Natatorium was featured in the November 1983 issue of the American School and University Magazine for receiving the Louis I. Kahn citation due to its architectural design.

In 1993, the Natatorium went through major renovations to update the facility for major athletics events. A new floor made of polyvinyl chloride (PVC) was installed in the movable area, and the hydraulics were repaired. The filter system located in the bottom is unique since the water is filtered through channels underneath the metal strips on the pool floor which also act as lane markers. This design significantly reduces water turbulence and resistance. These were removed and the filters were completely cleaned. Over 10,000 new stainless-steel screws reinstalled the metal strips. In 1995, the Natatorium was closed for the summer for a $1.2 million renovation project to replace the filtration system.

By 2012, the School of Physical Education and Tourism Management shared facilities at the IU Natatorium. The building is divided into deck, concourse and bridge levels, covering approximately 200,000 gross square feet. The deck level contains weight-training and conditioning rooms, a 50-meter competitive pool, a diving pool, and a 50-meter instructional pool. A research suite for exercise physiology and biomechanics is also located on the deck level. The concourse level of the physical education wing contains a large gymnasium, an auxiliary gymnasium, racquetball courts, and the Informal Learning Laboratory. The bridge level contains the administrative and faculty offices. In 2016, the Natatorium was renovated to update the entire facility to better serve a variety of sports events of different sizes. The project was completed in time to host the 2016 U.S. Olympic Team Trials for Diving.

The facility was host to the USA Olympic Diving Trials in 1984, 1988, 1992, 1996, 2008, 2016, and 2020. It hosted the USA Olympic Swimming Trials in 1984, 1992, 1996, and 2000. In addition, the Natatorium building houses the IUPUI Recreation Program in the basement of the facility, including the Polaris weight room which was built in 1996.

Popularly known as IUPUI, this facility has been host to numerous other swim events including the 1982 National Sports Festival, the 1987 Pan American Games, 2001 World Police and Fire Games, NCAA Championships, USA Swimming National Championships, Big Ten Conference Championships, and Big East Conference Championships. Additionally, in July 2009, IUPUI hosted one of USA Swimming's most elite competitions, the 2009 ConocoPhillips National Championships.

As part of the agreement for being selected to host the 2016 USA Diving Olympic Trials, the Natatorium underwent roughly $18 million in renovation and repairs before 2016. The project included a new roof, improved climate control, lighting, skylights, and other mechanical repairs. According to local television station WTHR in 2014, "the venue cost $21 million to build in 1982, and would cost nearly $75 million to replace."

In 2020, the School of Health and Human Sciences’ physical education program celebrated its 150-year anniversary with the addition of a new fitness garden outside the south entrance of the Natatorium. The new 5,095-square-foot (473.3 m^{2}) fitness garden features 33 fitness stations, picnic tables, benches, and greenspace. The School of Physical Education and Tourism Management first began planning this project in 2015.

== Notable events ==
- 1987 Pan American Games Modern Pentathlon, Swimming, Synchronized Swimming, and Water Polo competitions (1987)
- Arena (now TYR) Pro Swim Series (2017 and 2018)
- Big East Conference Swimming and Diving Championships (2009, 2013, and 2024)
- Duel in the Pool (2003 and 2015)
- FINA Diving World Cup (1989)
- FINA Swimming World Cup (1988–1989, 2022)
- FINA Synchronised Swimming World Cup (1985)
- FINA World Junior Swimming Championships (2017)
- FINA World Junior Synchronised Swimming Championships (2010)
- FINA World Masters Championships (1992)
- NCAA Men's Division I Swimming and Diving Championships (1983, 1986, 1988, 1989, 1990, 1992, 1993, 1995, 1999, 2013, and 2017)
- NCAA Women's Division I Swimming and Diving Championships (1984, 1987, 1989, 1991, 1994, 1997, 2000, 2013, and 2017)
- NCAA Division II Men's and Women's Swimming and Diving Championships (2006, 2015, 2016, 2019, 2023)
- Pan American Junior Water Polo Championships (2022)
- U.S. Open Swimming Championships (1988, 1990, 1997, and 2012)
- U.S. Olympic Team Trials (1984, 1992, 1996, and 2000)
- United States Spring Swimming Championships (1983, 1984, 1992, 2003, and 2005)
- United States Swimming National Championships (1982, 1994, 2007, 2009, 2013, 2017, 2023)
- NCAA Women's Water Polo Championship (2025)

== World records broken in the natatorium ==
=== Long course meters ===
==== Men ====
50 m Freestyle

22.18 Peter Williams (South Africa); April 10, 1988

100 m Backstroke

53.17 Aaron Peirsol (USA); April 2, 2005

51.94 Aaron Peirsol (USA); July 8, 2009

200 m Backstroke

1:58.86 Rick Carey (USA); June 27, 1984

1:53.08 Aaron Peirsol (USA); July 11, 2009

100 m Breaststroke

1:02.53 Steve Lundquist (USA); August 21, 1982

1:02.13 John Moffet (USA); June 25, 1984

100 m Butterfly

53.38 Pablo Morales (USA); June 26, 1984

50.22 Michael Phelps (USA); July 9, 2009

400 m Individual Medley

4:10.73 Michael Phelps (USA); April 6, 2003

==== Women ====
100 m Freestyle

54.48 Jenny Thompson (USA); March 1, 1992

1500 m Freestyle

15:20.48 Katie Ledecky (USA); May 16, 2018

200 m Breaststroke

2:25.92 Anita Nall (USA); March 2, 1992

2:25.35 Anita Nall (USA); March 2, 1992

=== Short course meters ===
==== Women ====
50 m Backstroke

27.25 Haley Cope (USA); March 17, 2000

800 m Freestyle

7:57.42 Katie Ledecky (USA) November 5, 2022

200 m Medley Relay

1:49.23 University of California (Haley Cope, Staciana Stitts, Waen Minpraphal, Joscelin Yeo); March 17, 2000 400 m Medley Relay

1:49.23 University of Georgia (Courtney Shealy, Kristy Kowal, Keegan Walkley, Maritza Correia); March 16, 2000

== See also ==
- List of diving facilities
- List of attractions and events in Indianapolis
- Sports in Indianapolis
