= 1989 NCAA Division I Men's Swimming and Diving Championships =

American college aquatic sports competition

1989 NCAA Division I Swimming and Diving Championships
- Host city: Indianapolis, Indiana
- Date(s): March 1989
- Venue(s): Indiana University Natatorium; Indiana University

The 1989 NCAA Division I Men's Swimming and Diving Championships were contested in March 1989 at the Indiana University Natatorium in Indianapolis, Indiana at the 66th annual NCAA-sanctioned swim meet to determine the team and individual national champions of Division I men's collegiate swimming and diving in the United States. The men's and women's titles would not be held at the same site until 2006.

Texas again topped the team standings, finishing 79 points ahead of Stanford. It was the Longhorns' second consecutive and third overall title and the third for coach Eddie Reese.

== Team standings ==
- Note: Top 10 only
- (H) = Hosts
- ^{(DC)} = Defending champions
- Full results

Rank	Team	Points
1st place, gold medalist(s)	Texas ^{(DC)}	475
2nd place, silver medalist(s)	Stanford	396
3rd place, bronze medalist(s)	Michigan	315
4	UCLA	313 1/2
5	USC	304
6	California	252
7	Florida	187
8	Iowa	176
9	Tennessee	160
10	Nebraska	145

== See also ==
- List of college swimming and diving teams
