= 1988 NCAA Division I Men's Swimming and Diving Championships =

American college aquatic sports competition

1988 NCAA Division I Swimming and Diving Championships
- Host city: Indianapolis, Indiana
- Date(s): March 1988
- Venue(s): Indiana University Natatorium; Indiana University

The 1988 NCAA Division I Men's Swimming and Diving Championships were contested in March 1988 at the Indiana University Natatorium in Indianapolis, Indiana at the 65th annual NCAA-sanctioned swim meet to determine the team and individual national champions of Division I men's collegiate swimming and diving in the United States. The men's and women's titles would not be held at the same site until 2006.

Texas topped the team standings, 54.5 points ahead of three-time defending champions Stanford. It was the Longhorns' second title and the second for coach Eddie Reese.

== Team standings ==
- Note: Top 10 only
- (H) = Hosts
- ^{(DC)} = Defending champions
- Full results

Rank	Team	Points
1st place, gold medalist(s)	Texas	424
2nd place, silver medalist(s)	USC	369 1/2
3rd place, bronze medalist(s)	Stanford ^{(DC)}	276 1/2
4	California	250
5	Michigan	203 1/2
6	LSU	164
7	UCLA	154
8	Florida	131 1/2
9	SMU	129
10	Nebraska	125

== See also ==
- List of college swimming and diving teams
