= 1985 NCAA Division I Women's Swimming and Diving Championships =

American college aquatic sports competition

- Host city: Tuscaloosa, Alabama
- Date(s): March 1985
- Venue(s): Alabama Aquatics Center; University of Alabama

The 1985 NCAA Women's Division I Swimming and Diving Championships were contested at the fourth annual NCAA-sanctioned swim meet to determine the team and individual national champions of Division I women's collegiate swimming and diving in the United States.

This year's events were hosted at the Alabama Aquatics Center at the University of Alabama in Tuscaloosa, Alabama

Defending champions Texas again topped the team standings, finishing 243 points ahead of Florida, claiming the Longhorns' second women's team title.

== Team standings ==
- Note: Top 10 only
- (H) = Hosts
- ^{(DC)} = Defending champions
- Full results

Rank	Team	Points
1st place, gold medalist(s)	Texas ^{(DC)}	643
2nd place, silver medalist(s)	Florida	400
3rd place, bronze medalist(s)	Stanford	340
4	California	283
5	Southern Illinois	231
6	USC	229
7	Alabama (H)	170 1/2
8	UCLA	146
9	Nebraska	123
10	SMU	114

== See also ==
- List of college swimming and diving teams
