= Terrie Miller =

Norwegian swimmer (born 1978)

Personal information
- Full name: Terrie Norlene Miller
- Nationality: Norway
- Born: 10 March 1978 (age 48) Green Bay, Wisconsin, United States
- Height: 1.82 m (6 ft 0 in)
- Weight: 73 kg (161 lb)

Sport
- Sport: Swimming
- Strokes: Breaststroke Medley Freestyle
- Club: Karasjok Svømmeklubb
- College team: Nebraska Cornhuskers (US)
Medal record
Representing Norway
Women's swimming
European Championships
Gold medal – first place	1996 Rostock	100 m breaststroke
Silver medal – second place	1996 Rostock	50 m breaststroke
Bronze medal – third place	1994 Stavanger	50 m breaststroke

Terrie Norlene Miller (born 10 March 1978) is an American-born Norwegian swimmer.

She competed at the European Short Course Swimming Championships 1996, where she won a gold medal in 100 m breaststroke and a silver medal in 50 m breaststroke. She also won a bronze medal in 50 m breaststroke at the 1994 European Sprint Swimming Championships in Stavanger. She was coached by Sondre Solberg since 1992.

She participated in the 1996 Summer Olympics, where she finished 20th in 100 m breaststroke.

In 1997, she accepted an athletic scholarship to attend the University of Nebraska–Lincoln in Lincoln, where she competed for the Nebraska Cornhuskers swimming and diving team under head coach Cal Bentz and assistants Jan Bidrman and Paul Nelsen. There she lived and trained with other renowned swimmers: Penny Heyns, Therese Alshammar, Helene Muller, Destiny Laurén, Emma Johnson, Anna Windsor, Lenka Manhalova, Melanie Dodd, Valērijs Kalmikovs and Adam Pine. While swimming for the Cornhuskers, Miller received three All-American honors (1997, 1998 and 1999), and captured two Big 12 Conference titles (1997 and 1998).

Also in 1997, Miller participated in the Norwegian gameshow Mestermøtet broadcast on TV2 presented by Hallvard Flatland.

Miller has 54 senior National Championship medals: 52 in swimming (26 gold, 22 silver and 4 bronze) 1993–2002 and two in ice hockey (gold in 1990 for Vålerenga Hockey and bronze in 2008 for Jordal Ishockeyklubb).

== Personal life ==
Miller was born in Green Bay, Wisconsin, United States on 10 March 1978.

== Clubs ==
=== Swimming ===
- Karasjok Svømmeklubb (1985–1987, 1998–2000)
- Alta Svømmeklubb (1988)
- Idrettslaget Varg (1989)
- Oslo Idrettslag (1989–1991)
- Lambertseter Svømmeklubb (1992–1995)
- Tromsø Svømmeklubb (2000–2001)
- Bærumsvømmerne (2001–2003, 2008–2009)

=== Ice Hockey ===
- De Pere Hotspurs (1983–1984)
- Vålerenga Hockey (1989–1991)
- Forward SPK Hockey (2006–2008)
- Jordal Ishockeyklubb (2008–2010)
- Ski IL Ishockey (1992–1993, 2017–)
