= 1997 NCAA Division I Women's Swimming and Diving Championships =

American college aquatic sports competition

- Host city: Indianapolis, Indiana
- Date(s): March 1997
- Venue(s): Indiana University Natatorium

The 1997 NCAA Women's Division I Swimming and Diving Championships were contested at the 16th annual NCAA-sanctioned swim meet to determine the team and individual national champions of Division I women's collegiate swimming and diving in the United States.

This year's events were hosted at the Indiana University Natatorium in Indianapolis, Indiana.

USC topped the team standings, finishing just 11 points ahead of five-time defending champions Stanford; it was the Trojans' first women's team title.

== Team standings ==
- Note: Top 10 only
- ^{(DC)} = Defending champions
- Full results

Rank	Team	Points
1st place, gold medalist(s)	USC	406
2nd place, silver medalist(s)	Stanford ^{(DC)}	395
3rd place, bronze medalist(s)	SMU	353 1/2
4	Arizona	351 1/2
5	Georgia	312
6	Michigan	264 1/2
7	Auburn	240
8	Nebraska	174 1/2
9	California	148
10	Texas	146 1/2

== See also ==
- List of college swimming and diving teams
