= Shaun Jordan =

American swimmer (born 1968)

Personal information
- Full name: Shaun M. Jordan
- National team: United States
- Born: February 1, 1968 (age 58) Jacksonville, Florida, U.S.
- Occupations: Business Management, Marketing
- Height: 6 ft 0 in (183 cm)
- Weight: 150 lb (68 kg)

Sport
- Sport: Swimming
- Events: 100-yard, 100-meter freestyle
- Strokes: Freestyle
- Club: Dallas Mustangs
- College team: University of Texas (1991); Univ. Texas MBA (1997)
- Coach: Mike Sorrell (High School); Eddie Reese (U. Texas)
Medal record
Men's swimming
Representing United States
Olympic Games
| Gold medal – first place | 1988 Seoul | 4x100 m freestyle |
| Gold medal – first place | 1992 Barcelona | 4x100 m freestyle |
Pan Pacific Championships
| Gold medal – first place | 1991 Edmonton | 4x100 m freestyle |
| Bronze medal – third place | 1991 Edmonton | 100 m freestyle |

Shaun M. Jordan (born February 1, 1968) is an American former competition swimmer who competed for the University of Texas and earned gold medals as a member of the U.S. 4x100 freestyle relay teams in both the 1988 Seoul and 1992 Barcelona Summer Olympics. After completing an MBA from the University of Texas in 1997, he taught swim clinics for several years forming his own company Jordan Aquatics in 2000 that taught swim classes, gave lessons, and provided outreach programs to poor and minority youth seeking to take up swimming. Beginning around 2003, he worked as a business and marketing manager for several Austin area investment firms including e360 Power LLC, Abraham Trading Company, and Artemis Capital Management.

== Early swimming ==
Shaun Jordan was born February 1, 1968 in Jacksonville, Florida. He attended Highland Park High School in Dallas, Texas, where he was an outstanding swimmer on their high school team under Coach Mike Sorrell. Sorrell also coached Jordan at the Dallas area's Mustang Aquatics, a highly competitive program which trained primarily at the Southern Methodist University pool. In his junior year, he swam the 4x100-yard freestyle at the state meet and broke the 50 second barrier for the first time. Not yet known as a nationally ranked swimmer, he placed third as a senior in the 100-yard freestyle at the Texas state meet. Texas swim coach Eddie Reese, who saw Jordan swim at the Texas State championship meet, helped recruit him to Texas. In his senior high school year, and his first year swimming for Texas, Jordan gained muscle and just under two extra inches of height.

== University of Texas ==
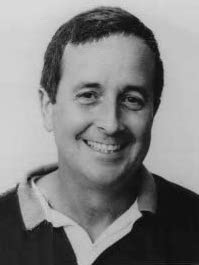
Coach Reese c. 1988

He attended the University of Texas at Austin, where he swam for Head Coach Eddie Reese and Associate Coach Kris Kubik's Texas Longhorns swimming and diving team from 1988 to 1991. By his sophomore year, after training hard for Texas, Jordan had dropped his 100-yard freestyle time to 43.06. In a rare distinction, he was a member of the Longhorns' four consecutive NCAA national championship teams. He was a three-time NCAA individual national champion in the 50-yard freestyle in 1991, and in the 100-yard freestyle in both 1989 and 1991. At the conference level, he was a 50-yard and 100-yard freestyle Southwest Conference record holder. Jordan holds the Texas Longhorns' 100-yard freestyle record and was captain of the Longhorns' 1990-91 NCAA national championship team. As a Senior at his fourth NCAA championship, he won the 100-yard freestyle with a time of 42.45, and won the 50-yard freestyle event. At the same NCAA championship in his Senior year, he swam a 42.02 in his anchor leg to help Texas win the 4x100-yard freestyle relay.

He graduated from the University of Texas with a bachelor's degree in economics in 1991. In 1997 he received his master of business administration (M.B.A.) degree with a focus in marketing from the University of Texas.

== 1988-92 Olympics ==
Jordan won two Olympic gold medals. At the 1988 Summer Olympics in Seoul, South Korea, he earned his first gold medal by swimming with the winning U.S. men's team in the qualifying heats of the 4×100-meter freestyle. He swam in Heat 3 of the preliminary rounds, where the U.S. won their heat, and Jordan swam a 50.19 for his leg, helping the U.S. team advance to the finals, where Jordan did not swim.

He received his second gold medal at the July, 1992 Summer Olympics in Barcelona, Spain, again by swimming in the preliminary heats for the first-place U.S. team in the 4×100-meter freestyle. He swam in Heat 1 of Round 1 of the preliminary rounds, where the U.S. won their heat, and Jordan swam a 49.94 for his leg, helping the U.S. team advance to the finals, where Jordan did not swim. His relay team swam a combined time of 3:18.50 in their preliminary heat. Jordan's former Coach at Texas, Eddie Reese, also served as the U.S. Olympic Men's team head coach at the 1992 Olympics.

Jordan won a gold medal in the 4×100-meter freestyle relay and a bronze in the individual 100-meter freestyle at the 1991 Pan Pacific Swimming Championships in Edmonton.

== Post-swimming career ==
Jordan conducted a few swim clinics as early as 1997. Beginning in 2000, he taught swim clinics with his company Jordan Aquatics, often in the Texas area. Jordan Aquatics Foundation, began by Jordan in 2000, was a non-profit founded largely to help young minorities learn to swim and form swim teams and had a corporate sponsor. The company offered adult swim classes, swim lessons and had an outreach program primarily for poor youths and minorities in the form of classes. In 2005, minority swim athlete and University of Texas graduate Paul Wallace took over as Jordan Aquatics's executive director, and Jordon stepped back, focusing more on his professional career as an investment counselor. In one of his first business management positions, Jordan worked as an investment counselor for e360 Power LLC for a year. e360 is an investment firm in Austin that gives access to American Energy and power markets to produce returns that are not tied to regular market fluctuations.

After 2003, Jordan worked as a marketing director at Abraham Trading Company, a financial adviser firm (CTA) where he remained for thirteen years, living in Texas, and likely greater Austin. He has more recently worked for Artemis Capital Management, which raises capital in the global hedge fund space, and has Austin and Texas-based offices. He has served as a member of the Harry Ransom Center Advisory Council, associated with the University of Texas, and is an ambassador for the University of Texas Athletic Department.

Jordan continued to swim on occasion after ending his swimming career, often on his own, and for a limited period with United States Masters Swimming. In 2008, at age 40 he represented Austin's Weis and Weis Aquatics, at the 2008 Short Course Nationals at the University of Texas in Austin. He competed in the 50-yard butterfly, placing seventh in his age group, opting out of the 50-meter freestyle due to the intense competition. He remained a highly skilled swimmer, but did not engage in intense training.

Jordan has a son, Jackson, born around 2008.

== Honors ==
Jordan was inducted into the Longhorn Hall of Honor, a University of Texas sports honorarium in November 2003. He became a member of the Texas Swimming and Diving Hall of Fame in 2012, and was admitted as a member of the Southwest Conference Hall of Fame, part of the Texas Sports Hall of Fame in October, 2023.

== See also ==
- List of Olympic medalists in swimming (men)
- List of University of Texas at Austin alumni
