= Kirk Stackle =

American former competition swimmer (born 1968)

Personal information
- Full name: Kirk Alexander Stackle
- National team: United States
- Born: April 16, 1968 (age 58)
- Height: 6 ft 3 in (1.91 m)
- Weight: 174 lb (79 kg)

Sport
- Sport: Swimming
- Strokes: Breaststroke
- College team: University of Texas

Kirk Alexander Stackle (born April 16, 1968) is an American former competition swimmer who participated in the 1988 Summer Olympics in Seoul, South Korea. Stackle competed in the preliminary heats of the men's 200-meter breaststroke, finishing with the nineteenth-best time overall (2:19.47). His wife, Alecha Stackle, played tennis at the University of Texas at Austin. Their daughter, Avery Stackle, swam for the University of Denver and now is in the legal psychology PhD program at FIU.

== See also ==
- List of University of Texas at Austin alumni
- Mount Carmel High School (San Diego)
