= 1990 NCAA Division I Men's Swimming and Diving Championships =

American college aquatic sports competition

1990 NCAA Division I Swimming and Diving Championships
- Host city: Indianapolis, Indiana
- Date(s): March 1990
- Venue(s): Indiana University Natatorium; Indiana University

The 1990 NCAA Division I Men's Swimming and Diving Championships were contested in March 1990 at the Indiana University Natatorium in Indianapolis, Indiana at the 67th annual NCAA-sanctioned swim meet to determine the team and individual national champions of Division I men's collegiate swimming and diving in the United States. The men's and women's titles would not be held at the same site until 2006.

Texas topped the team standings, finishing 83 points ahead of USC. It was the Longhorns' third consecutive and fourth overall title and the fourth for coach Eddie Reese.

== Team standings ==
- Note: Top 10 only
- (H) = Hosts
- ^{(DC)} = Defending champions
- Full results

Rank	Team	Points
1st place, gold medalist(s)	Texas ^{(DC)}	506
2nd place, silver medalist(s)	USC	423
3rd place, bronze medalist(s)	Stanford	354
4	Michigan	351 1/2
5	Florida	305
6	UCLA	244
7	California	204
8	Tennessee	195
9	Alabama	176
10	Arizona	154

== See also ==
- List of college swimming and diving teams
