= 1988 NCAA Division I Women's Swimming and Diving Championships =

American college aquatic sports competition

- Host city: Austin, Texas
- Date(s): March 1988
- Venue(s): Texas Swimming Center; University of Texas

The 1988 NCAA Women's Division I Swimming and Diving Championships were contested at the seventh annual NCAA-sanctioned swim meet to determine the team and individual national champions of Division I women's collegiate swimming and diving in the United States.

This year's events were hosted by the University of Texas at the Texas Swimming Center in Austin, Texas.

Hosts Texas once again topped the team standings, finishing 118.5 points ahead of Florida, claiming the Longhorns' fifth consecutive and fifth overall women's team title.

== Team standings ==
- Note: Top 10 only
- (H) = Hosts
- ^{(DC)} = Defending champions
- Full results

Rank	Team	Points
1st place, gold medalist(s)	Texas (H) ^{(DC)}	661
2nd place, silver medalist(s)	Florida	542 1/2
3rd place, bronze medalist(s)	Stanford	419
4	California	241
5	Clemson	218 1/2
6	Arizona State	205
7	Virginia	173 1/2
8	Michigan	167
9	UCLA	153
10	South Carolina	123 1/2

== See also ==
- List of college swimming and diving teams
