= 2000 NCAA Division I Women's Swimming and Diving Championships =

American college aquatic sports competition

- Host city: Indianapolis, Indiana
- Date(s): March 2000
- Venue(s): Indiana University Natatorium

The 2000 NCAA Women's Division I Swimming and Diving Championships were contested at the 19th annual NCAA-sanctioned swim meet to determine the team and individual national champions of Division I women's collegiate swimming and diving in the United States.

This year's events were hosted at the Indiana University Natatorium in Indianapolis, Indiana.

Georgia again finished atop the team standings, 18.5 points ahead of Arizona; it was the Bulldogs' second consecutive and second overall women's team title.

== Team standings ==
- Note: Top 10 only
- ^{(DC)} = Defending champions
- Full results

Rank	Team	Points
1st place, gold medalist(s)	Georgia ^{(DC)}	490 1/2
2nd place, silver medalist(s)	Arizona	472
3rd place, bronze medalist(s)	Stanford	397
4	California	311 1/2
5	Auburn	207
6	Northwestern	186 1/2
7	USC	185
8	UCLA	163
9	Texas; Virginia	155

== See also ==
- List of college swimming and diving teams
