= Reynaldo Castro =

Dominican Republic diver

Personal information
- Nationality: Dominican
- Born: 14 July 1961 (age 64)

Sport
- Sport: Diving

Reynaldo Castro (born 14 July 1961) is a Dominican Republic diver. He competed at the 1980 Summer Olympics and the 1984 Summer Olympics. In his teens, he attended high school in Michigan where in 1978 and 1979 he became Michigan State High School Diving Champion. After high school, he attended the University of Nebraska–Lincoln.
