= 1984 NCAA Division I Women's Swimming and Diving Championships =

American college aquatic sports competition

- Host city: Indianapolis, Indiana
- Date(s): March 1984
- Venue(s): Indiana University Natatorium

The 1984 NCAA Women's Division I Swimming and Diving Championships were contested at the third annual NCAA-sanctioned swim meet to determine the team and individual national champions of Division I women's collegiate swimming and diving in the United States.

This year's events were hosted by Indiana University at the Indiana University Natatorium in Indianapolis, Indiana.

Texas topped the team standings, finishing 68 points ahead of defending champions Stanford, claiming the Longhorns' first women's team title.

== Team standings ==
- Note: Top 10 only
- (H) = Hosts
- ^{(DC)} = Defending champions
- Full results

Rank	Team	Points
1st place, gold medalist(s)	Texas	392
2nd place, silver medalist(s)	Stanford ^{(DC)}	324
3rd place, bronze medalist(s)	Florida	313
4	USC	232
5	North Carolina	208
6	Auburn	111
7	Alabama; Southern Illinois	107
9	Michigan	58
10	Houston	49 1/2
18	Indiana (H)	23

== See also ==
- List of college swimming and diving teams
