= 1990 NCAA Division I Women's Swimming and Diving Championships =

American college aquatic sports competition

- Host city: Austin, Texas
- Date(s): March 1990
- Venue(s): Texas Swimming Center; University of Texas

The 1990 NCAA Women's Division I Swimming and Diving Championships were contested at the seventh annual NCAA-sanctioned swim meet to determine the team and individual national champions of Division I women's collegiate swimming and diving in the United States.

This year's events were hosted by the University of Texas at the Texas Swimming Center in Austin, Texas.

Hosts Texas reclaimed the top spot in the team standings, finishing 9.5 points ahead of defending champions Stanford. It was the Longhorns' sixth women's team title. The University Of Texas team consisted of: Caron Arnold Farrell, Katy Arris Wilson, Julie Cooper Bliemel, Andrea Ciro, Kelley Davies Currin, Jeanne Doolan Cunningham, Dana Dutcher May, Leigh Ann Fetter-Witt, Andrea Hayes Dickson, Kelly Jenkins Madden, Erica Jude Cain, Kristi Kiggans Bertelsman, Julie Knesel Powell, Lydia Morrow Chase, Tara Nye Huntress, Garland O’Keefe Wilson, Patty Overmyer Armstrong, Marlene Parchman Cornelius, Amy Shaw Collins, Kristina Stinson Straface, Melissa Strieby Cusack, Dorsey Tierney Walker, Jodi Wilson Kuhn, Head Coach Mark Schubert, Assistant Coach Jill Sterkel, Assistant Coach Cheryl Ridall

== Program changes ==
- Platform diving made its debut at the championships, the most recent new event added to the program.

== Team standings ==
- Note: Top 10 only
- (H) = Hosts
- ^{(DC)} = Defending champions
- Full results

Rank	Team	Points
1st place, gold medalist(s)	Texas (H)	632
2nd place, silver medalist(s)	Stanford ^{(DC)}	622 1/2
3rd place, bronze medalist(s)	Florida	477
4	California	263
5	UCLA	224
6	USC	182 1/2
7	Michigan	163
8	SMU	122
9	Arizona State	118
10	Northwestern	100

== See also ==
- List of college swimming and diving teams
