= 1994 NCAA Division I Women's Swimming and Diving Championships =

American college aquatic sports competition

- Host city: Indianapolis, Indiana
- Date(s): March 1994
- Venue(s): Indiana University Natatorium

The 1994 NCAA Women's Division I Swimming and Diving Championships were contested at the 13th annual NCAA-sanctioned swim meet to determine the team and individual national champions of Division I women's collegiate swimming and diving in the United States.

This year's events were hosted at the Indiana University Natatorium in Indianapolis, Indiana.

Stanford again topped the team standings, finishing 91 points ahead of Texas; it was the Cardinal's third consecutive and fifth overall women's team title. This marked the seventh time that Stanford and Texas finished in the top two.

== Team standings ==
- Note: Top 10 only
- ^{(DC)} = Defending champions
- Full results

Rank	Team	Points
1st place, gold medalist(s)	Stanford ^{(DC)}	512
2nd place, silver medalist(s)	Texas	421
3rd place, bronze medalist(s)	Florida	387 1/2
4	SMU	272
5	Auburn	242
6	USC	240
7	UCLA	191
8	Michigan	173
9	Alabama	153
10	Arizona	151

== See also ==
- List of college swimming and diving teams
