= 1986 NCAA Division I women's swimming and diving championships =

American college aquatic sports competition

1986 NCAA Division I Women's Swimming and Diving Championships
- Host city: Fayetteville, Arkansas
- Date(s): March 1986
- Venue(s): Arkansas Natatorium; University of Arkansas

The 1986 NCAA Women's Division I Swimming and Diving Championships were contested at the fifth annual NCAA-sanctioned swim meet to determine the team and individual national champions of Division I women's collegiate swimming and diving in the United States.

This year's events were hosted at the Arkansas Natatorium at the University of Arkansas in Fayetteville, Arkansas

Two-time defending champions Texas again topped the team standings, finishing 47 points ahead of Florida, claiming the Longhorns' third women's team title.

== Team standings ==
- Note: Top 10 only
- (H) = Hosts
- ^{(DC)} = Defending champions
- Full results

Rank	Team	Points
1st place, gold medalist(s)	Texas ^{(DC)}	633
2nd place, silver medalist(s)	Florida	586
3rd place, bronze medalist(s)	Stanford	538
4	California	238
5	Southern Illinois	167
6	UCLA	166
7	Clemson	123
8	Miami (FL)	121
9	Georgia	116
10	Alabama; LSU	82
25	Arkansas (H)	30

== See also ==
- List of college swimming and diving teams
