= Jeff Lee (swimmer) =

American swimmer

Personal information
- National team: USA
- Born: October 2, 1981 (age 45) Munster, Indiana, United States
- Occupation: Financial Analyst

Sport
- Sport: Swimming
- Events: 100, 200 Freestyle; 4x200 Freestyle relay
- Strokes: Freestyle
- College team: University of Southern California
- Coach: James, Brenda Lee (Early age-group); Gary Davis, M. Blaze (Munster High); Mark Schubert (USC)
Medal record
Representing the United States
Pan American Games
Gold medal – first place	2003 Santo Domingo	4×200 m freestyle

Jeff Lee (born October 2, 1981) is a former international freestyle swimmer from the United States who was an All American swimmer at the University of Southern California under Coach Mark Schubert. Lee won a gold medal at the 2003 Pan American Games with the US relay teams in the men's 4 × 200 m freestyle that set a Pan Am record.

== Early life and swimming ==
Lee was born October 2, 1981, in Munster, Indiana, to James and Brenda Lee, who both were involved in coaching Jeff's early age group swimming programs. He began age group swimming around the age of 6, chaperoned by his parents with his older brother Matt, who later competed for the University of Virgina, a strong swimming program. One of Jeff's early clubs was the Crown Point Swim Club in Crown Point, Indiana, where his mother coached. Jeff credits some of his motivation in High School to trying to train harder and swim faster than his brother Matt. From 1995 to 1999, Jeff attended Munster High School, graduating in 1999. While at Munster, he swam three years for Coach Gary Davis and then for Mike Blaze in his Senior year.

During his High School swimming career, Lee collected twelve All-American honors which included six in individual events and six in relays. While at Munster High, he was a state Champion in individual events four times. As both a Junior and Senior at Munster, he won state titles in 1998 in the 100 and 200-yard freestyle competition. In 1999, he set a state record of 1:37.36 in the 200-yard individual freestyle. Lee swam the anchor position for Munster's 200 freestyle relay team that competed in the 1997 state title championship. Lee set four high school swimming records, and four additional school records in non-swimming events. A noteworthy student, he was a member of the National Honor Society, and a volunteer for the Salvation Army and Muscular Dystrophy, and started a successful program to mentor students.

== University of Southern California ==
USC Coach M. Schubert, '88

From around 1999–2003, Lee swam for the University of Southern California, under Hall of Fame Coach Mark Schubert, who coached USC roughly from 1992 to 2006, and a frequent assistant for American teams at the Olympics. At USC, he captured All-American swimming honors 16 times while competing in NCAA championships. He won an NCAA title in 2002, and has held records in NCAA events. He held six school records in swimming events, and in 2001–3, he was co-captain of the swimming team for USC.

In August 2003, Lee retired from competitive swimming after winning the gold medal in the 4x200 meter freestyle at the Pan American Games in the Dominican Republic. The 4x200 team set a Pan Am record for their combined time, defeating a strong team from Brazil.

== Careers ==
He has worked for Abbott Laboratories as a Financial Analyst, while residing in Stockholm, Sweden, where he moved in 2005 with his wife.

== Honors ==
As a High School Senior at Munster High School, he was a recipient of the IHSAA Herman F. Keller Mental Attitude Award, and a Male Athlete of the Year in 1999, as announced by the Tim Bishop Times. He was later made a member of the Indiana High School Swimming and Diving Hall of Fame.
