= 1987 NCAA Division I women's swimming and diving championships =

American college aquatic sports competition

1987 NCAA Division I Women's Swimming and Diving Championships
- Host city: Indianapolis, Indiana
- Date(s): March 1987
- Venue(s): Indiana University Natatorium

The 1987 NCAA Women's Division I Swimming and Diving Championships were contested at the sixth annual NCAA-sanctioned swim meet to determine the team and individual national champions of Division I women's collegiate swimming and diving in the United States.

This year's events were hosted by Indiana University at the Indiana University Natatorium in Indianapolis, Indiana.

Texas again topped the team standings, finishing just 17 points ahead of Stanford; it was the Longhorns' fourth consecutive and fourth overall women's team title.

== Team standings ==
- Note: Top 10 only
- (H) = Hosts
- ^{(DC)} = Defending champions
- Full results

| Rank | Team | Points |
|---|---|---|
| 1st place, gold medalist(s) | Texas ^{(DC)} | 648 1/2 |
| 2nd place, silver medalist(s) | Stanford | 631 1/2 |
| 3rd place, bronze medalist(s) | Florida | 315 |
| 4 | California | 294 |
| 5 | Clemson | 243 |
| 6 | Georgia | 182 |
| 7 | Arizona State | 152 |
| 8 | USC | 146 |
| 9 | North Carolina | 138 |
| 10 | Michigan | 109 1/2 |
| 32 | Indiana (H) | 6 |

== See also ==
- List of college swimming and diving teams
