= 1991 NCAA Division I Women's Swimming and Diving Championships =

American college aquatic sports competition

- Host city: Indianapolis, Indiana
- Date(s): March 1991
- Venue(s): Indiana University Natatorium

The 1991 NCAA Women's Division I Swimming and Diving Championships were contested at the 10th annual NCAA-sanctioned swim meet to determine the team and individual national champions of Division I women's collegiate swimming and diving in the United States.

This year's events were hosted at the Indiana University Natatorium in Indianapolis, Indiana.

Texas again topped the team standings, finishing 93 points ahead of Stanford; it was the Longhorns' second consecutive and seventh overall women's team title. The University Of Texas team consisted of: Katy Arris Wilson, Beth Barr, BJ Bedford, Julie Cooper Bliemel, Kristi Busico Metzger, Andrea Ciro, Dana Dutcher May, Mary Ellen Dwayne, Leigh Ann Fetter-Witt, Andrea Fisher, Shannon Halverson, Erica Hanson, Whitney Hedgepeth, Erica Jude Cain, Lydia Morrow Chase, Tara Nye Huntress, Garland O’Keefe Wilson, Amy Shaw Collins, Julie Sommer, Kristina Stinson Straface, Dorsey Tierney Walker, Jodi Wilson Kuhn, Head Coach Mark Schubert, Assistant Coach Jill Sterkel, Assistant Coach Cheryl Ridall

== Team standings ==
- Note: Top 10 only
- ^{(DC)} = Defending champions
- Full results

Rank	Team	Points
1st place, gold medalist(s)	Texas ^{(DC)}	746
2nd place, silver medalist(s)	Stanford	653
3rd place, bronze medalist(s)	Florida	353
4	California	275
5	UCLA	192
6	SMU	190
7	Arizona	163
8	Georgia	137
9	USC	135
10	Miami (FL)	127

== See also ==
- List of college swimming and diving teams
