= Peter Williams (swimmer) =

South African swimmer (born 1968)

Personal information
- Born: 20 June 1968 (age 58)
Medal record
Men's swimming
Representing South Africa
Commonwealth Games
Bronze medal – third place	1994 Victoria	50 m freestyle

Peter Rowan Williams (born 20 June 1968) is a South African former swimmer who set a world record in the 50 metre freestyle. He placed third in the 50 metre freestyle at the 1994 Commonwealth Games, and fourth at the 1992 Summer Olympics. At the Olympics he also competed on the South African teams in 4×100 metre freestyle relay and 4×100 metre medley relay, but did not reach the final in either.

Williams was managed by Hall of Fame Coach Charles McCaffree, who coached at Michigan State University.

== See also ==
- List of Commonwealth Games medallists in swimming (men)
- World record progression 50 metres freestyle
