= Texas Longhorns swimming and diving =

Program of the University of Texas

- University: University of Texas at Austin
- Head coach: Bob Bowman (men's); Carol Capitani (women's); Matt Scoggin (diving)
- Conference: SEC
- Location: Austin, Texas, US
- Home pool: Lee and Joe Jamail Texas Swimming Center
- Nickname: Longhorns
- Colors: Burnt orange and white

Men's NCAA Champions
- 1981, 1988, 1989, 1990, 1991, 1996, 2000, 2001, 2002, 2010, 2015, 2016, 2017, 2018, 2021, 2025, 2026

Women's NCAA Champions
- 1984, 1985, 1986, 1987, 1988, 1990, 1991

Women's AIAW Champions
- 1981, 1982

Men's Conference Champions
- SWC; 1932, 1933, 1934, 1935, 1936, 1937, 1938, 1939, 1940, 1941, 1942, 1943, 1944, 1946, 1947, 1948, 1949, 1950, 1951, 1952, 1955, 1980, 1981, 1982, 1983, 1984, 1985, 1986, 1987, 1988, 1989, 1990, 1991, 1992, 1993, 1994, 1995, 1996 Big 12; 1997, 1998, 1999, 2000, 2001, 2002, 2003, 2004, 2005, 2006, 2007, 2008, 2009, 2010, 2011, 2012, 2013, 2014, 2015, 2016, 2017, 2018, 2019, 2020, 2021, 2022, 2023, 2024 SEC; 2025, 2026

Women's Conference Champions
- SWC; 1983, 1984, 1985, 1986, 1987, 1988, 1989, 1990, 1991, 1992, 1993, 1994, 1995, 1996 Big 12; 1999, 2000, 2001, 2002, 2003, 2004, 2005, 2006, 2007, 2009, 2011, 2013, 2014, 2015, 2016, 2017, 2018, 2019, 2020, 2021, 2022, 2023, 2024

The Texas Longhorns swimming and diving program represents The University of Texas at Austin in NCAA Division I intercollegiate men's and women's swimming and diving competition. The Longhorns competed in the Big 12 Conference through the 2023–24 season and moved to the Southeastern Conference (SEC) on July 1, 2024.

The first swim team at the University of Texas was created and developed under Tex Robertson. Robertson was the head coach of the team between 1936 and 1943 and between 1946 and 1950. During that period he led the Longhorns to 13 Southwest Conference championships.

In 1979, Eddie Reese became the head coach of the men's swimming team. Under Reese, the Texas men's team has won 15 NCAA championships, the most among all programs, and 41 consecutive conference championships. The women's team has won seven NCAA championships and two AIAW championships.

== Men's swimming and diving ==
=== NCAA team championships ===
- 1981 – coach: Eddie Reese and Mike Brown (Diving)
- 1988 – coach: Eddie Reese and Mike Brown (Diving)
- 1989 – coach: Eddie Reese and Mike Brown (Diving)
- 1990 – coach: Eddie Reese and Mike Brown (Diving)
- 1991 – coach: Eddie Reese and Mike Brown (Diving)
- 1996 – coach: Eddie Reese and Matt Scoggin (Diving)
- 2000 – coach: Eddie Reese and Matt Scoggin
- 2001 – coach: Eddie Reese and Matt Scoggin
- 2002 – coach: Eddie Reese and Matt Scoggin
- 2010 – coach: Eddie Reese and Matt Scoggin
- 2015 – coach: Eddie Reese and Matt Scoggin
- 2016 – coach: Eddie Reese and Matt Scoggin
- 2017 – coach: Eddie Reese and Matt Scoggin
- 2018 – coach: Eddie Reese and Matt Scoggin
- 2021 – coach: Eddie Reese and Matt Scoggin
- 2025 – coach: Bob Bowman and Matt Scoggin
- 2026 – coach: Bob Bowman and Matt Scoggin

=== Individual champions ===
Year	Athlete	Event
1951	David Browning	1-meter diving, 3-meter diving
1952	David Browning	1-meter diving, 3-meter diving
1980	Clay Britt	100 backstroke
1981	Clay Britt	100 backstroke
1981	Kris Kirchner	50 freestyle
1981	Scott Spann	100 butterfly
1982	Clay Britt	100 backstroke
1982	Rick Carey	200 backstroke
1983	Rick Carey	100 backstroke, 200 backstroke
1983	Matt Scoggin	1-meter diving
1984	Rick Carey	100 backstroke, 200 backstroke
1984	Matt Scoggin	1-meter diving
1987	Doug Gjertsen	200 backstroke
1988	Doug Gjertsen	200 freestyle
1988	Kirk Stackle	200 breaststroke
1989	Shaun Jordan	100 freestyle
1989	Kirk Stackle	100 breaststroke
1990	Doug Gjertsen	200 freestyle
1990	Kirk Stackle	100 breaststroke
1991	Shaun Jordan	50 freestyle, 100 freestyle
1991	Jason Rhodes	3-meter diving
1992	Jason Rhodes	3-meter diving
1993	Josh Davis	200 freestyle
1997	Neil Walker	100 backstroke
1998	Neil Walker	100 backstroke
1999	Troy Dumais	3-meter diving
2000	Troy Dumais	1-meter diving, 3-meter diving
2000	Matt Ulrickson	100 backstroke
2001	Ian Crocker	100 butterfly
2001	Troy Dumais	1-meter diving, 3-meter diving
2001	Nate Dusing	200 backstroke, 200 individual medley
2001	Brendan Hansen	100 breaststroke, 200 breaststroke
2002	Ian Crocker	100 butterfly
2002	Troy Dumais	1-meter diving, 3-meter diving
2002	Brendan Hansen	100 breaststroke, 200 breaststroke
2003	Ian Crocker	100 butterfly
2003	Brendan Hansen	100 breaststroke, 200 breaststroke
2003	Aaron Peirsol	200 backstroke
2004	Ian Crocker	100 freestyle, 100 butterfly
2004	Brendan Hansen	100 breaststroke, 200 breaststroke
2004	Rainer Kendrick	200 butterfly
2004	Aaron Peirsol	200 backstroke
2006	Garrett Weber-Gale	100 freestyle
2008	Dave Walters	200 freestyle
2009	Drew Livingston	1-meter diving
2010	Austin Surhoff	200 individual medley
2011	Eric Friedland	200 breaststroke
2011	Michael McBroom	1650 freestyle
2012	Jimmy Feigen	50 freestyle, 100 freestyle
2012	Daxon Hill	200 freestyle
2012	Drew Livingston	1-meter diving
2014	Michael Hixon	1-meter diving, 3-meter diving
2015	Will Licon	400 individual medley, 200 breaststroke
2015	Joseph Schooling	100 butterfly, 200 butterfly
2015	Clark Smith	500 freestyle
2016	Townley Haas	200 freestyle, 500 freestyle
2016	Will Licon	200 individual medley, 200 breaststroke
2016	Joseph Schooling	100 butterfly, 200 butterfly
2017	Jack Conger	200 butterfly
2017	Townley Haas	200 freestyle
2017	Will Licon	200 individual medley, 100 breaststroke, 200 breaststroke
2017	Clark Smith	500 freestyle, 1650 freestyle
2018	Townley Haas	200 freestyle, 500 freestyle
2018	Austin Katz	200 backstroke
2019	Townley Haas	500 freestyle
2019	John Shebat	200 backstroke
2019	Jordan Windle	Platform diving
2021	Jordan Windle	1-meter diving
2022	Drew Kibler	200 freestyle
2023	Luke Hobson	500 freestyle, 200 freestyle
2024	Luke Hobson	200 freestyle
2025	Luke Hobson	200 freestyle
2025	Rex Maurer	500 freestyle, 400 individual medley
2025	Hubert Kos	100 backtroke, 200 backstroke, 200 individual medley
2026	Hubert Kos	100 backstroke, 200 backstroke
2026	Rex Maurer	400 individual medley

=== Relay champions ===
Year	Athletes	Event
1980	Clay Britt, Nick Nevid, Scott Spann, Kris Kirchner	400 medley
1981	Clay Britt, Scott Spann, William Paulus, Kris Kirchner	400 medley
1981	Kris Kirchner, Eric Finical, Andy Schmidt, Scott Spann	400 free
1982	Clay Britt, Nick Nevid, William Paulus, Eric Finical	400 medley
1984	Rick Carey, Stuart Smith, Chris Rives, John Smith	400 medley
1988	Andy Gill, Kirk Stackle, Keith Anderson, Chris Jacobs	400 medley
1988	Jeff Olsen, Adam Werth, Shaun Jordan, Doug Gjertsen	800 free
1988	Chris Jacobs, Shaun Jordan, Keith Anderson, Doug Gjertsen	400 free
1989	Shaun Jordan, Keith Anderson, Alex Wittig, Doug Gjertsen	200 free
1989	Shaun Jordan, Keith Anderson, Adam Werth, Doug Gjertsen	400 free
1989	Adam Werth, Shaun Jordan, Matt Stahlman, Doug Gjertsen	800 free
1989	Andy Gill, Hans Dersch, Keith Anderson, Doug Gjertsen	400 medley
1990	Shaun Jordan, Jack Currin, Doug Dickinson, Alex Wittig	200 free
1990	Shaun Jordan, Adam Werth, Doug Dickinson, Doug Gjertsen	400 free
1990	Shaun Jordan, Adam Werth, Matt Stahlman, Doug Gjertsen	800 free
1990	Jeff Thibault, Kirk Stackle, Shaun Jordan, Doug Gjertsen	400 medley
1991	Shaun Jordan, Brett Stone, Alex Wittig, Doug Dickinson	200 free
1991	Josh Davis, Adam Werth, Jason Fink, Shaun Jordan	400 free
1991	Jeff Thibault, Adam Werth, Shaun Jordan, Doug Dickinson	200 medley
1991	Josh Davis, Matt Stahlman, Kevin Williams, Adam Werth	800 free
1994	Jason Fink, Josh Davis, Chris Eckermann, Gary Hall Jr.	400 free
1996	Brian Esway, Sean McGrath, Stephan Martyak, Neil Walker	200 free
1998	Bryan Jones, Scott Goldblatt, Nate Dusing, Jamie Rauch	800 free
1999	Bryan Jones, Scott Goldblatt, Nate Dusing, Jamie Rauch	800 free
2000	Tommy Hannan, Russell Chozick, Nate Dusing, Bryan Jones	400 medley
2000	Matt Ulrickson, Russell Chozick, Nate Dusing, Bryan Jones	200 medley
2000	Jon Younghouse, Nate Dusing, Scott Goldblatt, Jamie Rauch	800 free
2001	Nate Dusing, Brendan Hansen, Tommy Hannan, Ian Crocker	400 medley
2001	Matt Ulrickson, Brendan Hansen, Nate Dusing, Leffie Crawford	200 medley
2001	Scott Goldblatt, Chris Kemp, Nate Dusing, Jamie Rauch	800 free
2001	Nate Dusing, Tommy Hannan, Ian Crocker, Jamie Rauch	400 free
2003	Aaron Peirsol, Brendan Hansen, Daniel DiToro, Ian Crocker	200 medley
2003	Aaron Peirsol, Brendan Hansen, Ian Crocker, Chris Kemp	400 medley
2003	John Suchand, Aaron Peirsol, Rainer Kendrick, Chris Kemp	800 free
2004	Aaron Peirsol, Brendan Hansen, Ian Crocker, Garrett Weber-Gale	400 medley
2009	Dave Walters, Ricky Berens, Scott Jostes, Michael Klueh	800 free
2010	Scott Jostes, Dave Walters, Neil Caskey, Ricky Berens	800 free
2012	Daxon Hill, Clay Youngquist, Austin Surhoff, Jimmy Feigen	400 free
2012	Daxon Hill, Clay Youngquist, Kip Darmody, Neil Caskey	800 free
2015	Matt Ellis, John Murray, Jack Conger, Kip Darmody	200 free
2015	Kip Darmody, Will Licon, Joseph Schooling, Jack Conger	400 medley
2016	Jack Conger, Townley Haas, Clark Smith, Joseph Schooling	800 free
2016	Brett Ringgold, Joseph Schooling, Jack Conger, John Murray	200 free
2016	John Shebat, Will Licon, Joseph Schooling, Jack Conger	400 medley
2017	Brett Ringgold, Jack Conger, Tate Jackson, Joseph Schooling	200 free
2017	John Shebat, Will Licon, Joseph Schooling, Jack Conger	400 medley
2017	John Shebat, Will Licon, Joseph Schooling, Brett Ringgold	200 medley
2017	Brett Ringgold, Jack Conger, Townley Haas, Joseph Schooling	400 free
2019	Drew Kibler, Austin Katz, Jeff Newkirk, Townley Haas	800 free
2019	Daniel Krueger, John Shebat, Tate Jackson, Townley Haas	400 free
2021	Drew Kibler, Austin Katz, Carson Foster, Jake Sannem	800 free
2021	Chris Staka, Caspar Corbeau, Alvin Jiang, Daniel Krueger	400 medley
2022	Drew Kibler, Coby Carrozza, Luke Hobson, Carson Foster	800 free
2022	Drew Kibler, Daniel Krueger, Caspar Corbeau, Cameron Auchinachie	400 free
2023	Luke Hobson, Coby Carrozza, Peter Larson, Carson Foster	800 free
2025	Will Modglin, Nate Germonprez, Hubert Kos, Chris Guiliano	200 medley
2026	Rafael Fente-Damers, Camden Taylor, Rex Maurer, Baylor Nelson	800 free

=== Records ===
As of November 23, 2024

Event	Time	Athlete	Meet	Date	Additional Note(s)
50 y Freestyle	18.60	Drew Kibler	2022 NCAA Division I Men's Swimming and Diving Championships	March 24, 2022	Big 12 Conference Record
100 y Freestyle	41.06	Tate Jackson	2018 Texas Hall of Fame Invitational	December 1, 2018	Big 12 Conference Record
200 y Freestyle	1:28.81	Luke Hobson	2024 NCAA Division I Men's Swimming and Diving Championships	March 29, 2024	NCAA, American, and U.S. Open, Big 12 Conference Record
500 y Freestyle	4:04.45	Rex Maurer	2024 Texas Hall of Fame Swimming Invitational	November 20, 2024	NCAA, American, and U.S. Open record, SEC Conference Record
1000 y Freestyle	8:33.93	Clark Smith	2015 Texas Hall of Fame Invitational	December 5, 2015	NCAA, American, and U.S. Open, Big 12 Conference Record
1650 y Freestyle	14:22.41	Clark Smith	2017 NCAA Division I Men's Swimming and Diving Championships	March 25, 2017	Big 12 Conference Record
100 y Backstroke	43.91	Will Modglin	2024 Texas Hall of Fame Swimming Invitational	November 21, 2024	
200 y Backstroke	1:36.42	John Shebat	2019 NCAA Division I Men's Swimming and Diving Championships	March 30, 2019	Big 12 Conference record
100 y Breaststroke	50.39	Nate Germonprez	2024 Texas Hall of Fame Swimming Invitational	November 21, 2024	
200 y Breaststroke	1:47.91	Will Licon	2017 NCAA Division I Men's Swimming and Diving Championships	March 25, 2017	American and Big 12 Conference Record
100 y Butterfly	43.75	Joseph Schooling	2017 NCAA Division I Men's Swimming and Diving Championships	March 24, 2017	Big 12 Conference record
200 y Butterfly	1:37.35	Jack Conger	2017 NCAA Division I Men's Swimming and Diving Championships	March 25, 2017	NCAA, American, and U.S. Open, Big 12 Conference Record
200 y IM	1:39.63	John Shebat	2019 NCAA Division I Men's Swimming and Diving Championships	March 28, 2019	Big 12 Conference record
400 y IM	3:33.79	Carson Foster	2022 NCAA Division I Men's Swimming and Diving Championships	March 25, 2022	Big 12 Conference record
200 y Freestyle Relay	1:14.41	Drew Kibler (18.83); Daniel Krueger (18.77); Caspar Corbeau (18.67); Cameron Auchinachie (18.14)	2022 NCAA Division I Men's Swimming and Diving Championships	March 24, 2022	Big 12 Conference record
400 y Freestyle Relay	2:45.12	Daniel Krueger (41.73); John Shebat (41.65); Tate Jackson (40.98); Townley Haas (40.76)	2019 NCAA Division I Men's Swimming and Diving Championships	March 30, 2019	Big 12 Conference record
800 y Freestyle Relay	6:03.42	Luke Hobson (1:29.63); Coby Carrozza (1:30.50); Peter Larson (1:33.14); Carson Foster (1:30.15)	2023 NCAA Division I Men's Swimming and Diving Championships	March 22, 2023	American record, Big 12 Conference record,
200 y Medley Relay	1:21.36	Anthony Grimm (20.65); Caspar Corbeau (22.55); Alvin Jiang (20.08); Cameron Auchinachie (18.08)	2022 NCAA Division I Men's Swimming and Diving Championships	March 23, 2022	Big 12 Conference record
400 y Medley Relay	2:59.22	John Shebat (44.58); Will Licon (49.75); Joseph Schooling (43.60); Jack Conger (41.29)	2017 NCAA Division I Men's Swimming and Diving Championships	March 23, 2017	Big 12 Conference record

=== Conference championships ===
==== Southwest Conference ====
1932, 1933, 1934, 1935, 1936, 1937, 1938, 1939, 1940, 1941, 1942, 1943, 1944, 1946, 1947, 1948, 1949, 1950, 1951, 1952, 1955, 1980, 1981, 1982, 1983, 1984, 1985, 1986, 1987, 1988, 1989, 1990, 1991, 1992, 1993, 1994, 1995, 1996

==== Big 12 Conference ====
1997, 1998, 1999, 2000, 2001, 2002, 2003, 2004, 2005, 2006, 2007, 2008, 2009, 2010, 2011, 2012, 2013, 2014, 2015, 2016, 2017, 2018, 2019, 2020, 2021, 2022, 2023, 2024

==== Southeastern Conference ====
2025, 2026

== Women's swimming and diving ==
Current head coach Carol Capitani is the 10th head coach in the program's history and has been in charge since June 2012. Matt Scoggin also coaches the women divers.

=== AIAW team championships ===
- 1981 – coach: Paul Bergen
- 1982 – coach: Paul Bergen

=== NCAA team championships ===
- 1984 – coach: Richard Quick
- 1985 – coach: Richard Quick
- 1986 – coach: Richard Quick
- 1987 – coach: Richard Quick
- 1988 – coach: Richard Quick
- 1990 – coach: Mark Schubert
- 1991 – coach: Mark Schubert

=== Conference championships ===
==== Southwest Conference ====
1983, 1984, 1985, 1986, 1987, 1988, 1989, 1990, 1991, 1992, 1993, 1994, 1995, 1996

==== Big 12 Conference ====
1999, 2000, 2001, 2002, 2003, 2004, 2005, 2006, 2007, 2008, 2009, 2011, 2013, 2014, 2015, 2016, 2017, 2018, 2019, 2020, 2021, 2022, 2023, 2024

==== Southeastern Conference ====
2025
