= 2006 NCAA Division I Swimming and Diving Championships =

American college aquatic sports competition

The 2006 NCAA Division Swimming and Diving Championships refer to one of two events held during March 2006 to determine the team and individual national champions of Division I men's and women's collegiate swimming and diving in the United States:

- 2006 NCAA Division I Men's Swimming and Diving Championships– held at the Georgia Tech Aquatic Center at the Georgia Institute of Technology in Atlanta, Georgia and won by Auburn
- 2006 NCAA Division I Women's Swimming and Diving Championships – held at the Gabrielsen Natatorium at the University of Georgia in Athens, Georgia and won by Auburn

== See also ==
- List of college swimming and diving teams
