= 2004 NCAA Division I Men's Swimming and Diving Championships =

American college aquatic sports competition

2004 NCAA Division I Swimming and Diving Championships
- Host city: (New York (state)) East Meadow, New York
- Date: March 25–27, 2004
- Venue: Nassau County Aquatic Center

The 2004 NCAA Division I Men's Swimming and Diving Championships took place March 25–27, 2004 in the Nassau County Aquatic Center, East Meadow, New York.

Along with the 2000 edition, this was one of only two NCAA championship meets held in short course meters (25 m) rather than the NCAA's traditional short-course yards (25 yd) format. This allowed for world records to be set at the competition.

== Team standings ==
- Note: Top 10 only
- ^{(DC)} = Defending champions

Rank	Team	Points
1st place, gold medalist(s)	Auburn ^{(DC)}	634
2nd place, silver medalist(s)	Stanford	377.5
3rd place, bronze medalist(s)	Texas	374
4	Arizona	322
5	Michigan	271
6	Florida	266
7	California	255.5
8	Tennessee	140
9	Minnesota	130
10	Georgia	112.5

== Swimming results ==
Event	Gold		Silver		Bronze	
50 m freestyle	Frédérick Bousquet; Auburn	21.10; WR	Ian Crocker; Texas	21.53	Ryan Wochomurka; Auburn	21.59
100 m freestyle	Ian Crocker; Texas	46.25; WR	Duje Draganja; California	46.64	Frédérick Bousquet; Auburn	46.87
200 m freestyle	Jayme Cramer; Stanford	1:45.04	Dan Ketchum; Michigan	1:45.11	George Bovell; Auburn	1:45.13
400 m freestyle	Peter Vanderkaay; Michigan	3:40.78	Dan Ketchum; Michigan	3:44.92	Tyler DeBerry; Arizona	3:45.51
1500 m freestyle	Peter Vanderkaay; Michigan	14:44.53	Oussama Mellouli; USC	14:45.49	Robert Margalis; Georgia	14:57.77
100 m backstroke	Peter Marshall; Stanford	50.32; WR	Markus Rogan; Stanford	51.60	Aaron Peirsol; Texas	51.75
200 m backstroke	Aaron Peirsol; Texas	1:50.64; WR	Markus Rogan; Stanford	1:51.37	Bryce Hunt; Auburn	1:53.15
100 m breaststroke	Brendan Hansen; Texas	58.19	Mark Gangloff; Auburn	58.78	Scott Usher; Wyoming	59.01
200 m breaststroke	Brendan Hansen; Texas	2:04.73	Scott Usher; Wyoming	2:07.66	Gary Marshall; Stanford	2:07.98
100 m butterfly	Ian Crocker; Texas	49.07; WR	Milorad Čavić; California	50.81	Duje Draganja; California	51.56
200 m butterfly	Rainer Kendrick; Texas	1:54.97	Jayme Cramer; Stanford	1:55.00	Daniel Cruz; Kentucky	1:55.15
200 m IM	George Bovell; Auburn	1:53.93; WR	Markus Rogan; Stanford	1:55.51	Ryan Lochte; Florida	1:55.62
400 m IM	Ryan Lochte; Florida	4:04.52; US, AR	Oussama Mellouli; USC	4:04.90	Robert Margalis; Georgia	4:09.34
200 m freestyle relay	Auburn; George Bovell (21.40); Ryan Wochomurka (21.04); Derek Gibb (20.76); Frédérick Bousquet (20.55)	1:23.75; US	Arizona; Lyndon Ferns (21.72); Eric la Fleur (21.06); Simon Burnett (21.31); Byron Jeffers (21.60)	1:25.69	Stanford; Ben Wildman-Tobriner (22.03); Peter Marshall (21.11); Andrew Schnell (21.49); Bobby O'Bryan (21.06)	1:25.69; AR
400 m freestyle relay	Auburn; George Bovell (47.06); Ryan Wochomurka (47.16); Derek Gibb (47.51); Frédérick Bousquet (47.12)	3:08.85; US	California; Duje Draganja (47.38); Milorad Čavić (47.44); Rolandas Gimbutis (47.70); Jonas Tilly (48.16)	3:10.68	Arizona; Eric la Fleur (49.06); Lyndon Ferns (47.54); Simon Burnett (47.90); Adam Ritter (48.68)	3:13.18
800 m freestyle relay	Michigan; Peter Vanderkaay (1:45.69); Davis Tarwater (1:45.61); Andrew Hurd (1:44.96); Dan Ketchum (1:45.16)	7:01.42; US	Stanford; Andy Grant (1:48.10); Markus Rogan (1:45.79); Shaun Phillips (1:47.46); Jayme Cramer (1:44.59)	7:05.94	Florida; Ryan Lochte (1:45.40); Kris Wiebeck (1:47.73); Adam Sioui (1:45.89); Brian Hartley (1:47.93)	7:06.95
200 m medley relay	Auburn; Doug Van Wie (24.24); Mark Gangloff (26.34); Frédérick Bousquet (22.73); Derek Gibb (20.94)	1:34.25; US	Texas; Aaron Peirsol (24.34); Brendan Hansen (26.59); Ian Crocker (21.81); Garrett Weber-Gale (21.84)	1:34.58; AR	California; Alex Lim (24.14); Henrique Barbosa (27.14); Milorad Čavić (22.91); Duje Draganja (20.83)	1:35.02
400 m medley relay	Texas; Aaron Peirsol (51.28); Brendan Hansen (57.82); Ian Crocker (48.62); Garrett Weber-Gale (47.66)	3:25.38; WR	Auburn; Bryce Hunt (51.67); Mark Gangloff (57.85); Frédérick Bousquet (51.09); George Bovell (46.58)	3:27.19	Stanford; Peter Marshall (50.79) US; Gary Marshall (58.36); Matt McDonald (50.62); Andrew Schnell (47.97)	3:27.74

Legend: WR – World record; US – U.S. Open record; AR – American record;

== Diving results ==
Event	Gold		Silver		Bronze	
1 m diving	Jevon Tarantino; Kentucky	388.65	Andy Bradley; South Carolina	384.90	Joona Puhakka; Arizona State	373.40
3 m diving	Joona Puhakka; Arizona State	647.30	Phillip Jones; Tennessee	633.50	Andy Bradley; South Carolina	616.45
Platform diving	Caesar Garcia; Auburn	635.05	Steve Segerlin; Auburn	574.80	Miguel Velazquez; Miami	533.55
