= 2003 NCAA Division I Men's Swimming and Diving Championships =

American college aquatic sports competition

2003 NCAA Division I Swimming and Diving Championships
- Host city: Austin, Texas
- Date: March 27–29, 2003
- Venue(s): Texas Swimming Center; University of Texas

The 2003 NCAA Division I Men's Swimming and Diving Championships were contested from March 27–29, 2003 at the Texas Swimming Center at the University of Texas in Austin, Texas at the 80th annual NCAA-sanctioned swim meet to determine the team and individual national champions of Division I men's collegiate swimming and diving in the United States.

Auburn topped the team standings, the Tigers' third men's title.

== Team standings ==
- Note: Top 10 only
- (H) = Hosts
- ^{(DC)} = Defending champions
- Full results

Rank	Team	Points
1st place, gold medalist(s)	Auburn	609 1/2
2nd place, silver medalist(s)	Texas ^{(DC)} (H)	413
3rd place, bronze medalist(s)	Stanford	374
4	California	329
5	USC	268
6	Florida	232
7	Minnesota	228
8	Arizona	205
9	Michigan	173 1/2
10	Virginia	125

== Swimming results ==
Event	Gold		Silver		Bronze	
50 freestyle	Frédérick Bousquet; Auburn	19.31	Milorad Čavić; California	19.37	Anthony Ervin; California	19.38
100 freestyle	Duje Draganja; California	42.02	Anthony Ervin; California	42.11	Frédérick Bousquet; Auburn	42.69
200 freestyle	Simon Burnett; Arizona	1:33.69	Chris Kemp; Texas	1:34.40	Dan Ketchum; Michigan	1:34.52
500 freestyle	Erik Vendt; USC	4:13.63	Robert Margalis; Georgia	4:14.24	Oussama Mellouli; USC	4:15.50
1650 freestyle	Erik Vendt; USC	14:29.85	Peter Vanderkaay; Michigan	14:43.73	Fran Crippen; Virginia	14:46.05
100 backstroke	Peter Marshall; Stanford	45.57	Aaron Peirsol; Texas	45.71	Alex Lim; California	46.59
200 backstroke	Aaron Peirsol; Texas	1:39.16; US, AR	Markus Rogan; Stanford	1:41.37	Bryce Hunt; Auburn	1:41.96
100 breaststroke	Brendan Hansen; Texas	51.96	Pat Calhoun; Auburn	53.03	Mihály Flaskay; USC	53.23
200 breaststroke	Brendan Hansen; Texas	1:52.62; US, AR	Vladislav Polyakov; Alabama	1:55.38	Mike Brown; Minnesota	1:55.63
100 butterfly	Ian Crocker; Texas	45.67	Luis Rojas; Arizona	46.01	Duje Draganja; California	46.40
200 butterfly	Ioan Gherghel; Alabama	1:42.35	Juan Veloz; Arizona	1:42.62	Michael Raab; Virginia	1:42.84
200 IM	George Bovell; Auburn	1:42.66; US	Joe Bruckart; California	1:44.30	Rainer Kendrick; Texas	1:44.51
400 IM	Robert Margalis; Georgia	3:39.92	Erik Vendt; USC	3:39.95	Ryan Lochte; Florida	3:41.45
200 freestyle relay	Stanford; Randall Bal (19.63); Peter Marshall (18.93); Andrew Schnell (19.43); Bobby O'Bryan (19.04)	1:17.03	Auburn; Ryan Wochomurka (19.71); Derek Gibb (19.00); Matthew Kidd (19.79); Frédérick Bousquet (18.78)	1:17.28	California; Milorad Čavić (19.73); Duje Draganja (19.31); Matt Lyon (19.77); Anthony Ervin (18.58)	1:17.39
400 freestyle relay	California; Duje Draganja (42.60); Milorad Čavić (42.31); Joe Bruckart (42.30); Anthony Ervin (41.78)	2:48.99; US	Auburn; George Bovell (42.77); Ryan Wochomurka (42.46); Matthew Kidd (42.98); Frédérick Bousquet (41.47)	2:49.68	Arizona; Lyndon Ferns (43.55); Luis Rojas (42.96); Eric la Fleur (43.12); Simon Burnett (43.02)	2:52.65
800 freestyle relay	Texas; Aaron Peirsol (1:34.57); John Suchand (1:35.66); Rainer Kendrick (1:34.66); Chris Kemp (1:33.73)	6:18.62	Florida; Carlos Jayme (1:36.14); Ryan Lochte (1:34.14); Kris Wiebeck (1:35.83); Adam Sioui (1:34.16)	6:20.54	Michigan; Peter Vanderkaay (1:35.80); Davis Tarwater (1:35.06); Tyler DeBerry (1:36.14); Dan Ketchum (1:33.78)	6:20.78
200 medley relay	Texas; Aaron Peirsol (21.49); Brendan Hansen (23.59); Daniel DiToro (20.35); Ian Crocker (19.03)	1:24.46; US, AR	Auburn; Bryce Hunt (22.30); Pat Calhoun (23.88); Frédérick Bousquet (20.21); Derek Gibb (18.57)	1:24.96	Stanford; Peter Marshall (21.51); Michael Bruce (24.55); Dan Westcott (20.73); Bobby O'Bryan (19.22)	1:26.01
400 medley relay	Texas; Aaron Peirsol^{[A]} Brendan Hansen; Ian Crocker (45.11); Chris Kemp (42.41)	3:04.47; US, AR	Stanford; Peter Marshall (45.32); Michael Bruce (53.14); Dan Westcott (45.71); Randall Bal (43.07)	3:07.24	Auburn; Bryce Hunt (46.58); Pat Calhoun (52.58); Andy Haidinyak (45.94); Frédérick Bousquet (42.18)	3:07.28

Legend: US – U.S. Open record; AR – American record;
1. Due to an electronic timing error, Aaron Peirsol's split was not recorded upon the completion of his leg. By extension, Brendan Hansen's split could not be calculated as only the cumulative 200-yard time (1:36.95) was known. This did not impact the overall result of the event.

== Diving results ==
Event	Gold		Silver		Bronze	
1 m diving	Joona Puhakka; Arizona State	395.80	Andy Bradley; South Carolina	359.00	Clayton Moss; Kentucky	355.00
3 m diving	Phillip Jones; Tennessee	649.70	Clayton Moss; Kentucky	646.75	Joona Puhakka; Arizona State	642.65
Platform diving	Caesar Garcia; Auburn Jason Coben; Michigan	575.80	None awarded		Ray Vincent; USC	563.25

== See also ==
- List of college swimming and diving teams
