= 2005 NCAA Division I Men's Swimming and Diving Championships =

American college aquatic sports competition

2005 NCAA Division I Swimming and Diving Championships
- Host city: Minneapolis, Minnesota
- Date: March 14–16, 2005
- Venue(s): University Aquatic Center; University of Minnesota

The 2005 NCAA Division I Men's Swimming and Diving Championships were contested from March 14–16, 2005 at the University Aquatic Center at the University of Minnesota in Minneapolis, Minnesota at the 82nd annual NCAA-sanctioned swim meet to determine the team and individual national champions of Division I men's collegiate swimming and diving in the United States.

Auburn again topped the team standings, finishing 77 points ahead of Stanford. It was the Tigers' third consecutive and fifth overall national title.

== Team standings ==
- Note: Top 10 only
- (H) = Hosts
- ^{(DC)} = Defending champions
- Full results

Rank	Team	Points
1st place, gold medalist(s)	Auburn ^{(DC)}	491
2nd place, silver medalist(s)	Stanford	414
3rd place, bronze medalist(s)	Arizona	388
4	California	381
5	Florida	284
6	Michigan	240
7	Texas	236
8	Northwestern	191
9	USC	189
10	Georgia	177
11	Minnesota (H)	175

== Swimming results ==
Event	Gold		Silver		Bronze	
50 freestyle	Frédérick Bousquet; Auburn	18.90	Duje Draganja; California	19.01	Ben Wildman-Tobriner; Stanford	19.27
100 freestyle	Duje Draganja; California	41.49; US	Frédérick Bousquet; Auburn	42.19	Lyndon Ferns; Arizona	42.34
200 freestyle	Simon Burnett; Arizona	1:33.28	Peter Vanderkaay; Michigan	1:33.71	Andy Grant; Stanford	1:33.97
500 freestyle	Peter Vanderkaay; Michigan	4:09.82	Tyler DeBerry; Arizona	4:14.35	Justin Mortimer; Minnesota	4:14.45
1650 freestyle	Larsen Jensen; USC	14:32.01	Peter Vanderkaay; Michigan	14:36.54	Robert Margalis; Georgia	14:38.58
100 backstroke	Matt Grevers; Northwestern	45.62	Ryan Lochte; Florida	45.65	Doug Van Wie; Auburn	46.17
200 backstroke	Ryan Lochte; Florida	1:38.37	Doug Van Wie; Auburn	1:41.24	Chris Dejong; Michigan	1:41.26
100 breaststroke	Gary Marshall; Stanford	52.68	Mihály Flaskay; Indiana	52.92	Mike Alexandrov; Northwestern	52.95
200 breaststroke	Vladislav Polyakov; Alabama	1:53.93	Mike Alexandrov; Northwestern	1:54.04	Gary Marshall; Stanford	1:54.54
100 butterfly	Duje Draganja; California	45.39	Daniel Ditoro; Texas	46.18	Lyndon Ferns; Arizona	46.33
200 butterfly	Davis Tarwater; Michigan	1:42.30	Rainer Kendrick; Texas	1:43.02	Daniel Cruz; Kentucky	1:43.97
200 IM	Ryan Lochte; Florida	1:41.71; US, AR	Eric Shanteau; Auburn	1:44.15	Dave Rollins; Arizona	1:44.42
400 IM	Oussama Mellouli; USC	3:39.19	Robert Margalis; Georgia	3:39.93	Eric Shanteau; Auburn	3:42.44
200 freestyle relay	California; Duje Draganja (19.24); Rolandas Gimbutis (18.86); Jonas Tilly (19.04); Milorad Čavić (18.64)	1:15.78; US	Auburn; Ryan Wochomurka (19.48); Frédérick Bousquet (18.64); Bryan Lundquist (19.14); George Bovell (18.74)	1:16.00	Arizona; Simon Burnett (19.41); Lyndon Ferns (18.69); Gerhard Zandberg (19.30); Jonas Persson (19.56)	1:16.96
400 freestyle relay	California; Duje Draganja (41.71); Milorad Čavić (41.87); Jonas Tilly (42.32); Rolandas Gimbutis (41.80)	2:47.70; US	Auburn; Frédérick Bousquet (41.87); George Bovell (42.66); Ryan Wochomurka (42.65); BJ Jones (43.20)	2:50.38	Arizona; Lyndon Ferns (42.37); Gerhard Zandberg (43.26); Simon Burnett (41.93); Adam Ritter (43.02)	2:50.58
800 freestyle relay	Florida; Ryan Lochte (1:33.41); Darian Townsend (1:33.32); Brian Hartley (1:35.93); Adam Sioui (1:33.87)	6:16.53	Michigan; Peter Vanderkaay (1:34.24); Davis Tarwater (1:34.56); Chris Dejong (1:35.94); Andrew Hurd (1:35.43)	6:18.17	Arizona; Lyndon Ferns (1:35.29); Tyler DeBerry (1:34.87); Jonas Persson (1:35.93); Simon Burnett (1:33.24)	6:19.33
200 medley relay	California; Milorad Čavić (21.72); Henrique Barbosa (24.55); Duje Draganja (20.35); Rolandas Gimbutis (18.68)	1:25.30	Stanford; Jayme Cramer (21.61); Rick Eddy (24.32); Matt McDonald (20.71); Ben Wildman-Tobriner (18.74)	1:25.38	Arizona; Nick Thoman (22.24); Dave Rollins (23.67); Albert Subirats (20.67); Gerhard Zandberg (19.15)	1:25.73
400 medley relay	Stanford; Jayme Cramer (46.23); Gary Marshall (52.19); Matt McDonald (46.21); Ben Wildman-Tobriner (41.82)	3:06.45	Arizona; Gerhard Zandberg (46.98); Ivan Barnes (53.13); Lyndon Ferns (45.76); Simon Burnett (41.70)	3:07.57	Auburn; Doug Van Wie (46.35); Sean Osborne (53.80); Frédérick Bousquet (46.05); George Bovell (41.72)	3:07.92

Legend: US – U.S. Open record; AR – American record;

== Diving results ==
Event	Gold		Silver		Bronze	
1 m diving	Joona Puhakka; Arizona State	398.20	Chris Colwill; Georgia	407.10	Stewart Smith; Alabama	382.80
3 m diving	Joona Puhakka; Arizona State	645.20	Chris Colwill; Georgia	631.15	Steve Segerlin; Auburn	618.30
Platform diving	Matt Bricker; Auburn	604.35	Steve Segerlin; Auburn	555.65	Miguel Velazquez; Miami	543.50

== See also ==
- List of college swimming and diving teams
