= 2006 NCAA Division I Men's Swimming and Diving Championships =

American college aquatic sports competition

2006 NCAA Division I Swimming and Diving Championships
- Host city: (Georgia (U.S. state)) Atlanta, Georgia
- Date: March 23–25, 2006
- Venue(s): Georgia Tech Aquatic Center; Georgia Institute of Technology

The 2006 NCAA Division I Men's Swimming and Diving Championships were contested from March 23–25, 2006 at the Georgia Tech Aquatic Center at the Georgia Institute of Technology in Atlanta, Georgia at the 83rd annual NCAA-sanctioned swim meet to determine the team and individual national champions of Division I men's collegiate swimming and diving in the United States.

Auburn once again topped the team standings, finishing 36 points ahead of Arizona. It was the Tigers' fourth consecutive and sixth overall men's team title.

== Team standings ==
- Note: Top 10 only
- (H) = Hosts
- ^{(DC)} = Defending champions
- Full results

Rank	Team	Points
1st place, gold medalist(s)	Auburn ^{(DC)}	480 1/2
2nd place, silver medalist(s)	Arizona	444 1/2
3rd place, bronze medalist(s)	Stanford	362 1/2
4	Texas	307
5	Florida	268 1/2
6	California	250 1/2
7	USC	223
8	Michigan	209
9	Georgia	197
10	Northwestern	183 1/2

== Swimming results ==
Event	Gold		Silver		Bronze	
50 freestyle	Cullen Jones; NC State	19.18	Ben Wildman-Tobriner; Stanford	19.22	Simon Burnett; Arizona	19.32
100 freestyle	Garrett Weber-Gale; Texas	42.11	Ben Wildman-Tobriner; Stanford	42.17	Simon Burnett; Arizona	42.54
200 freestyle	Simon Burnett; Arizona	1:31.20; US	Peter Vanderkaay; Michigan	1:33.31	Dominik Meichtry; California	1:33.75
500 freestyle	Peter Vanderkaay; Michigan	4:08.60; US, AR	Oussama Mellouli; USC	4:12.92	Sebastien Rouault; Georgia	4:12.94
1650 freestyle	Sebastien Rouault; Georgia	14:29.43	Peter Vanderkaay; Michigan	14:33.76	Larsen Jensen; USC	14:44.89
100 backstroke	Matt Grevers; Northwestern	45.93	Doug Van Wie; Auburn	46.22	Nick Thoman; Arizona	46.67
200 backstroke	Ryan Lochte; Florida	1:37.68; US, AR	Hongzhe Sun; Stanford	1:40.25	Nick Thoman; Arizona	1:41.31
100 breaststroke	Henrique Barbosa; California	52.52	Kevin Swander; Indiana	52.54	Dave Rollins; Arizona	52.91
200 breaststroke	Henrique Barbosa; California	1:53.97	Vladislav Polyakov; Alabama	1:54.08	Paul Kornfeld; Stanford	1:54.41
100 butterfly	Lyndon Ferns; Arizona	45.89	Albert Subirats; Arizona	46.02	Sam Masson; USC	46.09
200 butterfly	Davis Tarwater; Michigan	1:41.84	Gil Stovall; Georgia	1:42.10	Viktor Bodrogi; USC	1:43.10
200 IM	Ryan Lochte; Florida	1:40.55; US, AR	Adam Ritter; Arizona	1:44.20	Eric Shanteau; Auburn	1:44.24
400 IM	Ryan Lochte; Florida	3:38.15	Oussama Mellouli; USC	3:39.47	Eric Shanteau; Auburn	3:44.27
200 freestyle relay	Auburn; César Cielo (19.51); Matt Targett (18.67); Bryan Lundquist (19.25); George Bovell (18.72)	1:16.15	Arizona; Simon Burnett (19.43); Lyndon Ferns (18.93); Albert Subirats (19.02); Adam Ritter (19.16)	1:16.54	California; Milorad Čavić (19.47); Jonas Tilly (19.25); William Copeland (19.19); Jernej Godec (18.81)	1:16.72
400 freestyle relay	Arizona; Simon Burnett (42.06); Lyndon Ferns (41.73); Albert Subirats (42.54); Adam Ritter (42.06)	2:48.39	Auburn; Jakob Andkjær (42.85); César Cielo (42.02); Matt Targett (41.68); George Bovell (42.34)	2:48.89	Texas; Matt McGinnis (43.02); Caleb McDermott (43.19); Jeremy Harris (43.27); Garrett Weber-Gale (42.08)	2:52.37
800 freestyle relay	Arizona; Simon Burnett (1:33.41); Lyndon Ferns (1:34.05); Tyler DeBerry (1:34.84); Adam Ritter (1:34.37)	6:16.67	Michigan; Peter Vanderkaay (1:34.16); Chris Dejong (1:34.62); Alex Vanderkaay (1:35.37); Davis Tarwater (1:33.96)	6:18.11	Texas; Michael Klueh (1:35.08); Caleb McDermott (1:35.61); Jeremy Harris (1:35.21); Ryan Verlatti (1:33.71)	6:19.61
200 medley relay	Arizona; Albert Subirats (21.47); Dave Rollins (23.33); Lyndon Ferns (20.22); Simon Burnett (18.86)	1:23.88; US	Auburn; Doug Van Wie (21.49); James Wike (24.47); Alexei Puninski (20.40); Matt Targett (18.72)	1:25.08	California; Milorad Čavić (21.78); Henrique Barbosa (24.00); Jernej Godec (20.49); Jonas Tilly (19.10)	1:25.37
400 medley relay	Arizona; Nick Thoman (46.49); Ivan Barnes (52.66); Albert Subirats (44.70); Adam Ritter (42.23)	3:06.08	Auburn; Doug Van Wie (46.48); James Wike (53.09); Alexei Puninski (45.73); César Cielo (42.13)	3:07.43	Stanford; Hongzhe Sun (46.42); Paul Kornfeld (52.90); Jason Dunford (46.92); Ben Wildman-Tobriner (41.72)	3:07.96

Legend: US – U.S. Open record; AR – American record;

== Diving results ==
Event	Gold		Silver		Bronze	
1 m diving	Chris Colwill; Georgia	407.10	Joona Puhakka; Arizona State	398.20	Steve Segerlin; Auburn	382.80
3 m diving	Chris Colwill; Georgia	460.95	Joona Puhakka; Arizona State	413.05	Steve Segerlin; Auburn	401.20
Platform diving	Steve Segerlin; Auburn	469.30	Chris Colwill; Georgia	443.95	Steven LoBue; Purdue	349.60

== See also ==
- List of college swimming and diving teams
