= 2007 NCAA Division I Men's Swimming and Diving Championships =

American college aquatic sports competition

2007 NCAA Division I Swimming and Diving Championships
- Host city: Minneapolis, Minnesota
- Date: March 15–17, 2007
- Venue(s): University Aquatic Center; University of Minnesota

The 2007 NCAA Division I Men's Swimming and Diving Championships were contested from March 15–17, 2007 at the University Aquatic Center at the University of Minnesota in Minneapolis, Minnesota at the 84th annual NCAA-sanctioned swim meet to determine the team and individual national champions of Division I men's collegiate swimming and diving in the United States.

Auburn again topped the team standings, finishing 169 points ahead of Stanford. It was the Tigers' fifth consecutive and seventh overall national title.

== Team standings ==
- Note: Top 10 only
- (H) = Hosts
- ^{(DC)} = Defending champions
- Full results

Rank	Team	Points
1st place, gold medalist(s)	Auburn ^{(DC)}	566
2nd place, silver medalist(s)	Stanford	397
3rd place, bronze medalist(s)	Arizona	371
4	Florida	321
5	Texas	296
6	Northwestern	221
7	Michigan	207
8	California	176
9	USC	145
10	Minnesota (H)	131

== Swimming results ==
Event	Gold		Silver		Bronze	
50 freestyle	César Cielo; Auburn	18.69 =US	Matt Targett; Auburn Ben Wildman-Tobriner; Stanford	19.08	None awarded	
100 freestyle	César Cielo; Auburn	41.17; US	Ben Wildman-Tobriner; Stanford	42.05	Garrett Weber-Gale; Texas	42.55
200 freestyle	Darian Townsend; Arizona	1:33.29	Dominik Meichtry; California	1:33.45	Adam Ritter; Arizona	1:33.76
500 freestyle	Larsen Jensen; USC	4:09.80	Shaun Phillips; Stanford	4:13.07	Jean Basson; Arizona	4:13.44
1650 freestyle	Larsen Jensen; USC	14:26.70	Shaun Phillips; Stanford	14:37.62	Sebastien Rouault; Georgia	14:47.50
100 backstroke	Albert Subirats; Arizona	44.83	Ben Hesen; Indiana	45.45	Matt Grevers; Northwestern	45.61
200 backstroke	Matt Grevers; Northwestern	1:38.71	Hongzhe Sun; Stanford	1:40.78	Lucas Salatta; Florida	1:41.86
100 breaststroke	Mike Alexandrov; Northwestern	51.56; US, AR	Paul Kornfeld; Stanford	52.19	Vladislav Polyakov; Alabama	52.25
200 breaststroke	Vladislav Polyakov; Alabama	1:52.71	Nate Cass; Stanford	1:53.36	Paul Kornfeld; Stanford	1:54.52
100 butterfly	Albert Subirats; Arizona	44.57; US	Ben Wildman-Tobriner; Stanford	45.36	Matt Targett; Auburn	45.87
200 butterfly	Patrick O'Neill; California	1:42.98	John Scott; Auburn	1:43.47	Gil Stovall; Georgia	1:43.54
200 IM	Adam Ritter; Arizona	1:41.72	Matt Grevers; Northwestern	1:41.96	Lucas Salatta; Florida	1:43.69
400 IM	Alex Vanderkaay; Michigan	3:40.89	Lucas Salatta; Florida	3:41.08	Pat Mellors; Virginia	3:42.03
200 freestyle relay	Auburn; César Cielo (18.69) US; Matt Targett (18.71); Scott Goodrich (18.69); Bryan Lundquist (18.62)	1:14.71; US	Stanford; Ben Wildman-Tobriner (18.87) AR; Jason Dunford (18.97); Alex Coville (19.06); Matt Crowe (19.07)	1:15.97	Arizona; Albert Subirats (19.11); Nick Nilo (19.00); Adam Ritter (19.09); Darian Townsend (19.06)	1:16.26
400 freestyle relay	Auburn; Jakob Andkjær (42.52); César Cielo (40.74); Matt Targett (41.45); Bryan Lundquist (41.85)	2:46.56; US	Arizona; Albert Subirats (42.05); Nick Nilo (41.70); Darian Townsend (41.90); Adam Ritter (42.21)	2:47.86	Northwestern; Matt Grevers (42.33); Bruno Barbic (42.85); Eric Nilsson (44.04); Kyle Bubolz (41.92)	2:51.14
800 freestyle relay	Arizona; Nick Nilo (1:34.10); Jean Basson (1:33.72); Darian Townsend (1:32.54); Adam Ritter (1:33.78)	6:14.14; US	Florida; Grant Johnson (1:34.20); Lucas Salatta (1:35.02); Shaune Fraser (1:34.19); Roland Rudolf (1:34.41)	6:17.82	Stanford; Andy Grant (1:34.34); Danny Beal (1:34.80); Hongzhe Sun (1:35.35); Shaun Phillips (1:33.43)	6:17.92; AR
200 medley relay	Auburn; Scott Goodrich (21.51); David Maras (23.40); Alexei Puninski (20.04); César Cielo (18.42)	1:23.37; US	Stanford; Hongzhe Sun (22.01); Paul Kornfeld (23.82); Jason Dunford (20.50); Ben Wildman-Tobriner (18.52)	1:24.85	Tennessee; Brad Boswell (21.64); Barry Murphy (23.82); Andrew Engle (20.82); Octavio Alesi (19.41)	1:25.69
400 medley relay	Northwestern; Matt Grevers (45.83); Mike Alexandrov (51.28); Kyle Bubolz (44.95); Bruno Barbic (42.34)	3:04.40; NC	Texas; Tom Sacco (46.19); Tyler O'Halloran (52.18); Ricky Berens (45.46); Garrett Weber-Gale (41.86)	3:05.69	Auburn; Scott Goodrich (47.27); David Maras (52.33); Alexei Puninski (45.46); César Cielo (41.03)	3:06.09

Legend: US – U.S. Open record; NC – NCAA record; AR – American record;

== Diving results ==
Event	Gold		Silver		Bronze	
1 m diving	Terry Horner; Florida State	399.35	Magnus Frick; Hawaii	395.05	Steve Segerlin; Auburn	371.40
3 m diving	Steve Segerlin; Auburn	415.80	Kellen Harkness; Ohio State	407.15	Magnus Frick; Hawaii	407.05
Platform diving	Steve Segerlin; Auburn	414.90	Michele Benedetti; Arizona State	412.10	Eric Sehn; Texas A&M	387.25

== See also ==
- List of college swimming and diving teams
