= Ryan Lochte =

American swimmer (born 1984)

Ryan Lochte OLY
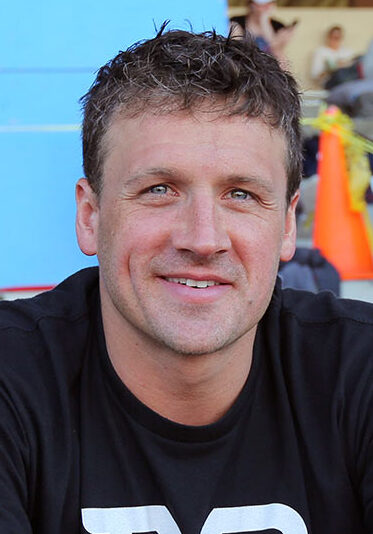
- Lochte in 2018

Personal information
- Full name: Ryan Steven Lochte
- Born: August 3, 1984 (age 42) Rochester, New York, U.S.
- Height: 6 ft 2 in (188 cm)
- Weight: 195 lb (88 kg)

Sport
- Sport: Swimming
- Strokes: Backstroke, freestyle, individual medley and Butterfly
- College team: University of Florida
Medal record
Men's swimming
Representing the United States
Event	1st	2nd	3rd
Olympic Games	6	3	3
World Championships (LC)	18	5	4
World Championships (SC)	21	10	7
Pan Pacific Championships	8	4	0
Pan American Games	1	0	0
Total	54	22	14
Olympic Games
Gold medal – first place	2004 Athens	4×200 m freestyle
Gold medal – first place	2008 Beijing	200 m backstroke
Gold medal – first place	2008 Beijing	4×200 m freestyle
Gold medal – first place	2012 London	400 m medley
Gold medal – first place	2012 London	4×200 m freestyle
Gold medal – first place	2016 Rio de Janeiro	4×200 m freestyle
Silver medal – second place	2004 Athens	200 m medley
Silver medal – second place	2012 London	200 m medley
Silver medal – second place	2012 London	4×100 m freestyle
Bronze medal – third place	2008 Beijing	200 m medley
Bronze medal – third place	2008 Beijing	400 m medley
Bronze medal – third place	2012 London	200 m backstroke
World Championships (LC)
Gold medal – first place	2005 Montreal	4×200 m freestyle
Gold medal – first place	2007 Melbourne	200 m backstroke
Gold medal – first place	2007 Melbourne	4×200 m freestyle
Gold medal – first place	2009 Rome	200 m medley
Gold medal – first place	2009 Rome	400 m medley
Gold medal – first place	2009 Rome	4×100 m freestyle
Gold medal – first place	2009 Rome	4×200 m freestyle
Gold medal – first place	2011 Shanghai	200 m freestyle
Gold medal – first place	2011 Shanghai	200 m backstroke
Gold medal – first place	2011 Shanghai	200 m medley
Gold medal – first place	2011 Shanghai	400 m medley
Gold medal – first place	2011 Shanghai	4×200 m freestyle
Gold medal – first place	2013 Barcelona	200 m backstroke
Gold medal – first place	2013 Barcelona	200 m medley
Gold medal – first place	2013 Barcelona	4×200 m freestyle
Gold medal – first place	2015 Kazan	200 m medley
Gold medal – first place	2015 Kazan	4×100 m medley
Gold medal – first place	2015 Kazan	4×100 m mixed freestyle
Silver medal – second place	2007 Melbourne	100 m backstroke
Silver medal – second place	2007 Melbourne	200 m medley
Silver medal – second place	2007 Melbourne	400 m medley
Silver medal – second place	2013 Barcelona	4×100 m freestyle
Silver medal – second place	2015 Kazan	4×200 m freestyle
Bronze medal – third place	2005 Montreal	200 m backstroke
Bronze medal – third place	2005 Montreal	200 m medley
Bronze medal – third place	2009 Rome	200 m backstroke
Bronze medal – third place	2011 Shanghai	4×100 m freestyle
World Championships (SC)
Gold medal – first place	2004 Indianapolis	4×200 m freestyle
Gold medal – first place	2006 Shanghai	200 m backstroke
Gold medal – first place	2006 Shanghai	200 m medley
Gold medal – first place	2006 Shanghai	400 m medley
Gold medal – first place	2008 Manchester	100 m medley
Gold medal – first place	2008 Manchester	200 m medley
Gold medal – first place	2008 Manchester	400 m medley
Gold medal – first place	2008 Manchester	4×100 m freestyle
Gold medal – first place	2010 Dubai	200 m freestyle
Gold medal – first place	2010 Dubai	200 m backstroke
Gold medal – first place	2010 Dubai	100 m medley
Gold medal – first place	2010 Dubai	200 m medley
Gold medal – first place	2010 Dubai	400 m medley
Gold medal – first place	2010 Dubai	4×100 m medley
Gold medal – first place	2012 Istanbul	200 m freestyle
Gold medal – first place	2012 Istanbul	100 m medley
Gold medal – first place	2012 Istanbul	200 m medley
Gold medal – first place	2012 Istanbul	4×100 m freestyle
Gold medal – first place	2012 Istanbul	4×200 m freestyle
Gold medal – first place	2012 Istanbul	4×100 m medley
Gold medal – first place	2014 Doha	4×200 m freestyle
Silver medal – second place	2004 Indianapolis	200 m medley
Silver medal – second place	2006 Shanghai	4×100 m medley
Silver medal – second place	2008 Manchester	200 m backstroke
Silver medal – second place	2008 Manchester	4×100 m medley
Silver medal – second place	2010 Dubai	4×200 m freestyle
Silver medal – second place	2012 Istanbul	200 m backstroke
Silver medal – second place	2014 Doha	200 m backstroke
Silver medal – second place	2014 Doha	200 m medley
Silver medal – second place	2014 Doha	4×50 m freestyle
Silver medal – second place	2014 Doha	4×100 m medley
Bronze medal – third place	2004 Indianapolis	200 m freestyle
Bronze medal – third place	2006 Shanghai	4×100 m freestyle
Bronze medal – third place	2006 Shanghai	4×200 m freestyle
Bronze medal – third place	2012 Istanbul	100 m butterfly
Bronze medal – third place	2014 Doha	200 m freestyle
Bronze medal – third place	2014 Doha	100 m medley
Bronze medal – third place	2014 Doha	4×100 m freestyle
Pan Pacific Championships
Gold medal – first place	2006 Victoria	4×200 m freestyle
Gold medal – first place	2010 Irvine	200 m freestyle
Gold medal – first place	2010 Irvine	200 m backstroke
Gold medal – first place	2010 Irvine	200 m medley
Gold medal – first place	2010 Irvine	400 m medley
Gold medal – first place	2010 Irvine	4×100 m freestyle
Gold medal – first place	2010 Irvine	4×200 m freestyle
Gold medal – first place	2014 Gold Coast	4×200 m freestyle
Silver medal – second place	2006 Victoria	100 m backstroke
Silver medal – second place	2006 Victoria	200 m medley
Silver medal – second place	2014 Gold Coast	100 m butterfly
Silver medal – second place	2014 Gold Coast	4×100 m freestyle
Pan American Games
Gold medal – first place	2003 Santo Domingo	4×200 m freestyle
Representing the Florida Gators
Event	1st	2nd	3rd
NCAA Championships	7	1	3
Total	7	1	3
By race
Event	1st	2nd	3rd
100 y backstroke	0	1	0
200 y backstroke	2	0	0
200 y medley	2	0	0
400 y medley	1	0	1
4×200 y freestyle	1	0	0
200 m medley	0	0	1
400 m medley	1	0	0
4×200 m freestyle	0	0	1
Total	7	1	3
NCAA Championships
Gold medal – first place	2004 East Meadow	400 m medley
Gold medal – first place	2005 Minneapolis	200 y backstroke
Gold medal – first place	2005 Minneapolis	200 y medley
Gold medal – first place	2005 Minneapolis	4×200 y freestyle
Gold medal – first place	2006 Atlanta	200 y backstroke
Gold medal – first place	2006 Atlanta	200 y medley
Gold medal – first place	2006 Atlanta	400 y medley
Silver medal – second place	2005 Minneapolis	100 y backstroke
Bronze medal – third place	2003 Austin	400 y medley
Bronze medal – third place	2004 East Meadow	200 m medley
Bronze medal – third place	2004 East Meadow	4×200 m freestyle

Ryan Steven Lochte (/ˈlɒkti/ LOK-tee; born August 3, 1984) is an American former competitive swimmer and 12-time Olympic medalist. He is the third-most decorated swimmer in Olympic history measured by total number of medals, behind only Michael Phelps and Katie Ledecky. Lochte's seven individual Olympic medals rank second in history in men's swimming (again to Michael Phelps), tied for second among all Olympic swimmers. He currently holds the world record in the 4×200-meter freestyle (long course).

Lochte's success has earned him SwimSwam's Swammy Award for U.S. Male Swimmer of the Year in 2013, the World Swimmer of the Year Award, and the American Swimmer of the Year Award twice. He has also been named the FINA Swimmer of the Year three times. He has won a total of 90 medals in major international competition (54 gold, 22 silver and 14 bronze) spanning the Olympics, the World Championships Pan American Games and Pan Pacific Championships, including six Olympic gold medals and 39 world championship titles.

Lochte specialized in the backstroke and individual medley but was also a freestyle and butterfly swimmer. He is noted for the speed and distance he attained while kicking underwater. Lochte is also known for the dominance he held in the short course format (25-yard and 25-meter-long pools). Lochte swam the 100-meter individual medley in a then-world record 50.71 seconds on December 15, 2012 at the FINA World Championships in Istanbul, Turkey. At this same event, he was also credited with swimming the then-fastest 200-meter individual medley, finishing in 1 minute 49.63 seconds.

In 2016, Lochte generated international controversy when he claimed that he and three other American swimmers had been pulled over and robbed by armed men with police badges while in Rio de Janeiro, Brazil, at the 2016 Summer Olympics. While initial news stories reported that Lochte and three other US swimmers had been robbed at gunpoint after a night out in Rio, later details emerged that the "armed robbers posing as police" were actually security guards at a gas station where the swimmers had urinated outside the bathroom and Lochte allegedly vandalized a framed poster, and ended with the swimmers providing money to the guards. Lochte apologized for not being more candid about the gas station dispute, and subsequently lost four major sponsorships. On September 8, both the U.S. Olympic Committee and USA Swimming suspended Lochte for 10 months and Bentz, Conger, and Feigen for four months. Additionally, Lochte was required to complete 20 hours of community service, and Bentz was required to complete 10 hours. All were made ineligible for financial support during their suspensions, removed from the U.S. Olympic delegation to the White House, barred from U.S. Olympic training centers, and blocked from attending USA Swimming's year-end Golden Goggles celebration. Lochte was charged in Brazil with falsely reporting a crime. The scandal gained significant media attention both during the games and after their conclusion. In July 2017, the court in Brazil dismissed the charges against Lochte, saying his actions "did not rise to the level of filing a false crime report."

On July 23, 2018, the U.S. Anti-Doping Agency imposed a 14-month suspension from competition on Lochte because he had received a "prohibited intravenous infusion." Lochte immediately accepted the sanction. On May 24, 2018, the same day he had received the infusion, Lochte had posted a picture – since deleted – on Instagram "showing him receiving an intravenous injection of what he says were 'vitamins'," even though the USADA bans "intravenous infusions of permitted substances at volumes greater than 100 millilitres [3.5 imp fl oz; 3.4 US fl oz] in a 12-hour period without a special 'Therapeutic Use Exemption'," Vox reported.

== Early life ==
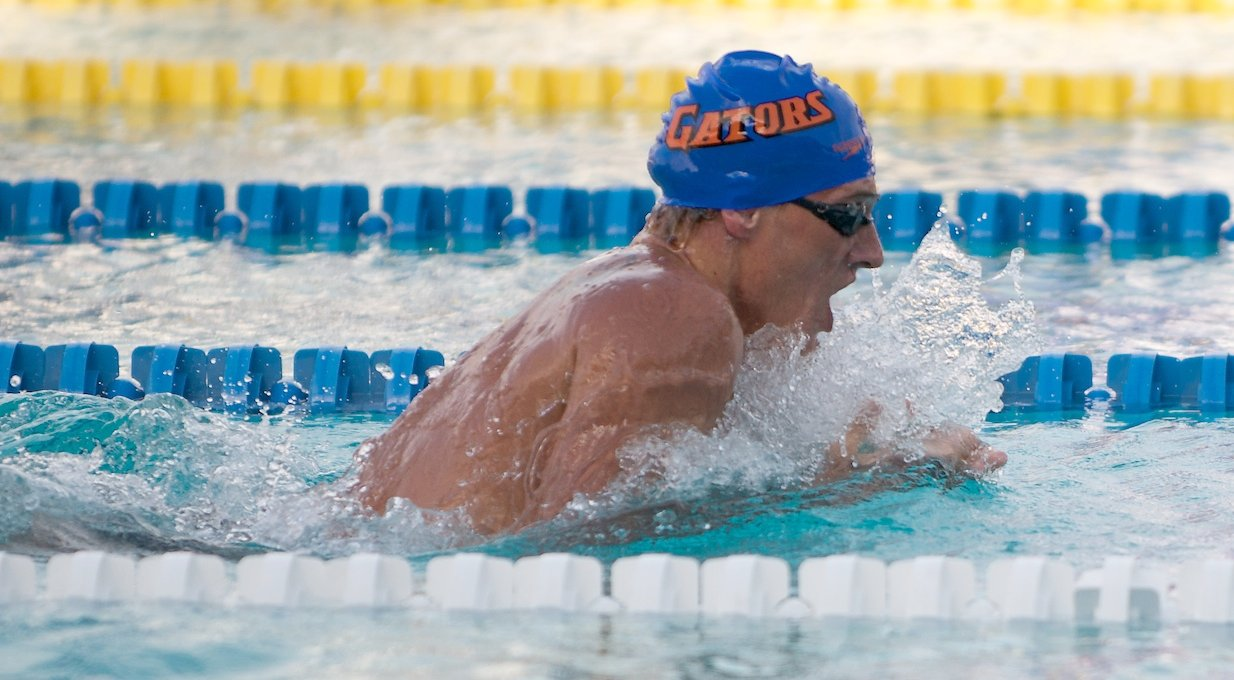
Lochte swimming in a 2009 meet

Lochte was born in Rochester, New York, the son of Ileana "Ike" Aramburu-Lochte and Steven R. Lochte. His mother is a Cuban of Basque descent and was born and raised in Havana, while his father is of Dutch, English, and German descent. He has two older sisters, Kristin and Megan, and two younger brothers, Devon and Brandon. During his early childhood, his family lived in Bristol, New York where he attended Bloomfield Central Schools. The family moved to Florida when Ryan was 12 so his father could coach swimming.

Lochte only began taking swimming seriously when he was in junior high school. His father said, "I would send him to go shower when he was messing around. He spent more time in the showers than he did in the pool." At 14 years old, his loss at the Junior Olympics changed his attitude. He later commented: "I suddenly said, 'I'm sick of losing'. After that I trained hard and I never lost there again."

He graduated from Spruce Creek High School in 2002.

== College career ==
Lochte attended the University of Florida and graduated in 2007, majoring in sport management. As a member of the Florida Gators swimming and diving team, he swam for coach Gregg Troy in National Collegiate Athletic Association (NCAA) and Southeastern Conference (SEC) competition from 2004 to 2007. At Florida, Lochte was the NCAA Swimmer of the Year twice, a seven-time NCAA champion, a seven-time SEC champion, and a 24-time All-American. At the 2006 NCAA Men's Swimming and Diving Championships, during his senior year, Lochte won national titles in all three of his individual events, setting U.S. Open and American records in the 200-yard individual medley and 200-yard backstroke. He also broke Tom Dolan's nearly decade-old NCAA record in the 400-yard individual medley.

== International career ==
=== 2004–2005 ===
Medal record

2004 Athens – Men's swimming

Representing the USA
Gold medal – first place	4×200 m freestyle relay	7:07.33 AM
Silver medal – second place	200 m individual medley	1:58.78

Lochte qualified for his first Olympics after finishing second to Michael Phelps in the 200-meter individual medley at the 2004 U.S. Olympic Team Trials. He also qualified for the 4×200-meter freestyle relay team after finishing fourth in the 200-meter freestyle final. At the 2004 Summer Olympics in Athens, Greece, Lochte swam with Phelps, Klete Keller, and Peter Vanderkaay to upset the Australian team and capture the gold medal in the 4×200-meter freestyle relay. It was the first loss for the Australian team in six years. He also narrowly edged out George Bovell and László Cseh in the 200-meter individual medley to win the silver medal behind Phelps.

Later that year, at the 2004 FINA Short Course World Championships in Indianapolis, Lochte won the silver medal in the 200-meter individual medley and the bronze in the 200-meter freestyle. He also won the gold medal in the 4×200-meter freestyle relay with Chad Carvin, Dan Ketchum, and Justin Mortimer.

At the 2005 World Aquatics Championships in Montreal, Lochte won the bronze medals in both the 200-meter backstroke and 200-meter individual medley. In the 4×200-meter freestyle relay, Lochte teamed with Phelps, Vanderkaay, and Keller to win gold ahead of Canada and Australia.

=== 2006–2007 ===
At the 2006 FINA Short Course World Championships in Shanghai, held just two weeks after the 2006 NCAA Championships, Lochte won three individual titles, one silver, and one bronze. He won the 200-meter individual medley and the 200-meter backstroke, setting new world records in both events. He also set another world record in the 100-meter backstroke in the opening leg of the 4×100-meter medley relay, becoming the first man to complete the distance in under 50 seconds. He won his third gold medal in the 400-meter individual medley, setting a new championship record.

At the 2007 World Aquatics Championships in Melbourne, Australia, Lochte won his first individual gold medal at a long course world championships in the 200-meter backstroke against compatriot Aaron Peirsol, breaking Peirsol's world record and his seven-year win streak in the event. This was Lochte's first world record in a long course event. A little more than 90 minutes later, Lochte went on to set a world record in the 4×200-meter freestyle relay with Phelps, Keller and Vanderkaay. He also won silver medals in the 100-meter backstroke, and 200-meter and 400-meter individual medley, making his medal total for the meet second only to Phelps.

Within a week of the world championships, Lochte competed in the annual Mutual of Omaha Duel in the Pool where he again beat Peirsol. In the 100-meter backstroke, he broke Peirsol's other seven-year winning streak in the shorter of the backstroke races, edging out Peirsol by 0.06 seconds.

=== 2008 Summer Olympics ===
Medal record

2008 Beijing – Men's swimming

Representing the USA
Gold medal – first place	200 m backstroke	1:53.94 WR
Gold medal – first place	4×200 m freestyle relay	6:58.56 WR
Bronze medal – third place	200 m individual medley	1:56.53
Bronze medal – third place	400 m individual medley	4:08.09

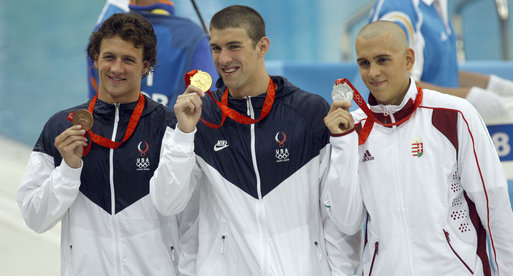
Lochte (left) with Phelps (center) and Cseh (right) after winning the bronze medal at the 2008 Summer Olympics in the 400-meter individual medley

==== Olympic Trials ====
At the 2008 U.S. Olympic Team Trials in Omaha, Nebraska, Lochte competed in six individual events and qualified to swim in three individual events at the 2008 Summer Olympics. Also, with his third-place finish in the 200-meter freestyle, Lochte was ensured a spot on the 4×200-meter freestyle relay. In his first event, Lochte finished second to Phelps in the 400-meter individual medley. Both Lochte and Phelps finished below Phelps' previous world record in the event. In his second event, the 200-meter freestyle, Lochte finished in third place behind Phelps and Vanderkaay. Less than 30 minutes after the 200-meter freestyle final, Lochte finished in third place behind Aaron Peirsol and Matt Grevers in the 100-meter backstroke final. The next day, Lochte competed in the 100-meter freestyle but withdrew after the semifinals. Two days later, in the 200-meter backstroke, Lochte finished in second place behind Peirsol, who equalled Lochte's world record. Less than 30 minutes after the 200-meter backstroke final, Lochte finished second to Phelps in the 200-meter individual medley.

==== Olympics ====
In his first event at the 2008 Summer Olympics, Lochte won the bronze medal in the 400-meter individual medley behind Phelps and Cseh. His time of 4:08.09 was two seconds slower than the time he swam in Omaha. In his second event, Lochte swam the second leg of the 4×200-meter freestyle relay. With Phelps, Ricky Berens, and Vanderkaay, he won his first gold medal and set his first world record as the American team finished first with a time of 6:58.56. The Americans were the first team to break the seven-minute mark in the relay, and broke the previous record, set in Melbourne, Australia, by more than four and a half seconds. In his third event, the 200-meter backstroke, Lochte won his first individual gold medal and set the world record, beating defending champion Peirsol. Twenty-seven minutes after the final of the 200-meter backstroke, Lochte went on to win the bronze in the 200-meter individual medley, finishing behind Phelps and Cseh.

=== 2009 World Championships ===
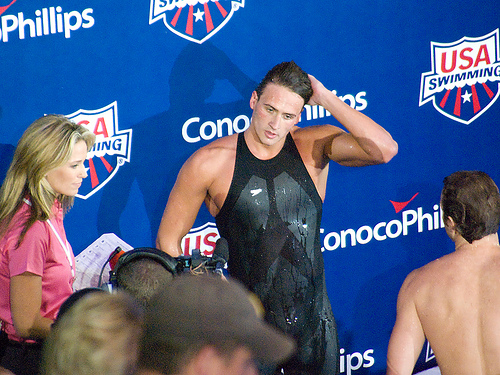
Lochte at the 2009 National Championships

At the 2009 National Championships, the selection meet for the 2009 World Aquatics Championships, Lochte won individual titles in the 200 and 400-meter individual medley. Lochte also qualified to swim in the 4×100 and 4×200-meter freestyle relay. In the 200-meter backstroke final, Lochte placed second behind Aaron Peirsol, and lost his world record he set in Beijing when Peirsol recorded a time of 1:53.08.

In his first event at the 2009 World Aquatics Championships in Rome, Lochte swam the second leg of the men's 4×100-meter freestyle relay in a time of 47.03. He earned a gold medal in the event along with Phelps, Matt Grevers, and Nathan Adrian. The final time of 3:09.21 was a championship record and just ahead of Russia (3:09.52) and France (3:09.89). With Phelps not competing in the 200 or 400-meter individual medley at these championships, Lochte won the gold in both events. In the 200-meter individual medley, Lochte broke Phelps' world record of 1:54.23 with a time of 1:54.10. In the 200-meter backstroke, Lochte won the bronze medal, finishing behind Peirsol and Ryosuke Irie of Japan. In the 4×200-meter freestyle relay final, Lochte swam the anchor leg in 1:44.46. Combined with Phelps, Berens, and David Walters, Lochte won the gold medal and his team broke the previous world record by one-hundredth of a second with a time of 6:58.55.

=== 2010 ===
At the 2010 National Championships, the selection meet for the 2010 Pan Pacific Swimming Championships and 2011 World Aquatics Championships, Lochte won individual titles in the 200-meter backstroke, 200-meter individual medley, and the 400-meter individual medley. He also placed second in the 100 and 200-meter freestyle. Lochte's win in the 200-meter individual medley was the first time he defeated Phelps in a major national or international meet. At the 2010 Pan Pacific Swimming Championships in Irvine, California, Lochte won a total of six gold medals. His wins included the 200-meter backstroke, 200-meter freestyle, 200 and 400-meter individual medleys, and 4×100 and 4×200-meter freestyle relays.

At the 2010 FINA Short Course World Championships in Dubai, Lochte became the first individual in history to win seven medals at the Short Course Worlds and was the only person to set a world record individually since body-length swimsuits were banned. In Dubai, Lochte won gold in the 200-meter backstroke, 200-meter freestyle, all individual medleys (100, 200, 400), and 4×100-meter medley relay. He also won silver in the 4×200-meter freestyle relay. Lochte's world records in Dubai came on consecutive days, first in the 400-meter individual medley, then in the 200-meter individual medley. Both world records were broken by considerable margins.

At year's end, Lochte was named the World Swimmer of the Year and American Swimmer of the Year by Swimming World Magazine. He was also named FINA male swimmer of the year for 2010 by FINA Aquatics World Magazine. 2010 saw Lochte win a total of 13 international medals, 12 of them gold.

=== 2011 World Championships ===
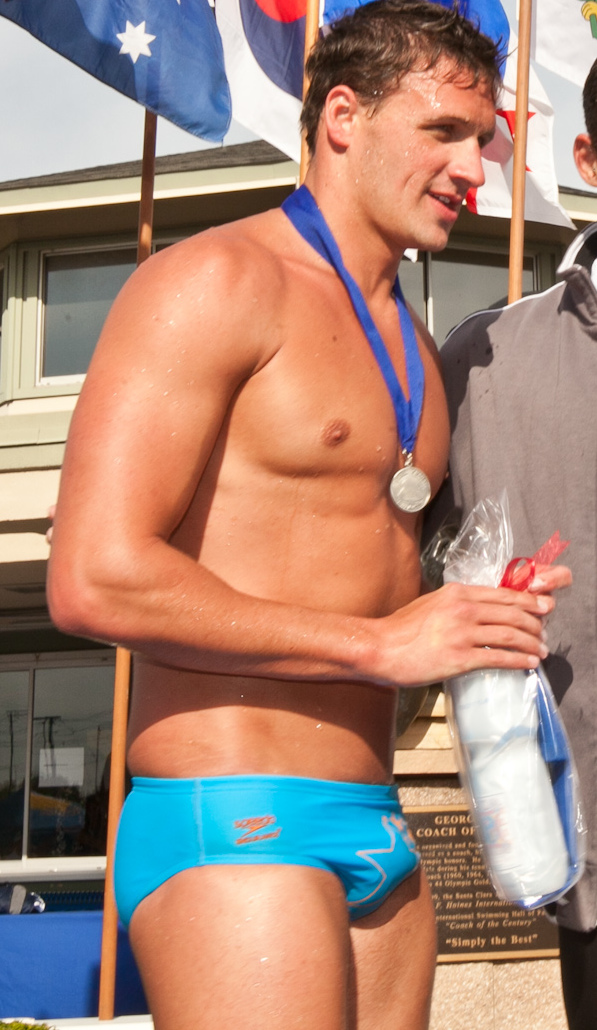
Lochte in 2011

At the 2011 World Aquatics Championships, Lochte won a total of six medals, five golds and one bronze. Lochte won his first medal, a bronze, in the 4×100-meter freestyle relay for his contributions in the heats. In the heats, Lochte recorded a time of 48.28, off from the 47.98 he recorded last year in Irvine. In his second event, the 200-meter freestyle, Lochte won the gold with a time of 1:44.44, finishing ahead of Michael Phelps who recorded a time of 1:44.79. It was Lochte's first gold in the event in the long course World Championships. Lochte won the 200-meter individual medley event in a world record time of 1:54.00, finishing ahead of Michael Phelps time of 1:54.16. In the 200-meter backstroke, Lochte dominated the competition with a time of 1:52.96, over a second ahead of second-place finisher Ryosuke Irie. Shortly after completing the 200-meter backstroke, Lochte competed in the 4×200-meter freestyle relay with Michael Phelps, Peter Vanderkaay, and Ricky Berens. Swimming the anchor leg in 1:44.56, Lochte was able to make up a deficit from France for the win. The final time for the relay was 7:02.67. In his last event, the 400-meter individual medley, Lochte continued his dominance with a win in a time of 4:07.13. His closest competitor, Tyler Clary, finished in 4:11.17, over four seconds behind.

Lochte said he was pleased with his performance at the 2011 World Aquatics Championships but feels that he can improve his times before the 2012 Olympics. "Getting five gold medals is definitely great, but the times that I went, I know I could go a lot faster," he said. "There are a lot of places in my races that I messed up on that I could have changed and gone faster, but I guess I have a whole year to make sure I have those perfect swims."

At year's end, Lochte was named the World Swimmer of the Year and American Swimmer of the Year by Swimming World Magazine, and defended his titles from 2010. He was also named FINA male swimmer of the year for 2011 by FINA Aquatics World Magazine and also defended this title.

=== 2012 Summer Olympics ===
Medal record

2012 London – Men's swimming

Representing the USA
Gold medal – first place	400 m individual medley	4:05.18
Gold medal – first place	4×200 m freestyle relay	6:59.70
Silver medal – second place	200 m individual medley	1:54.90
Silver medal – second place	4×100 m freestyle relay	3:10.38
Bronze medal – third place	200 m backstroke	1:53.94

==== Olympic Trials ====
At the 2012 United States Olympic Trials, the qualifying meet for the 2012 Summer Olympics, Lochte qualified for the Olympic team by finishing first in the 200-meter backstroke and 400-meter individual medley, and second in the 200-meter freestyle and 200-meter individual medley. Lochte also narrowly missed a spot competing in the individual 100-meter butterfly by finishing third.

==== Olympics ====
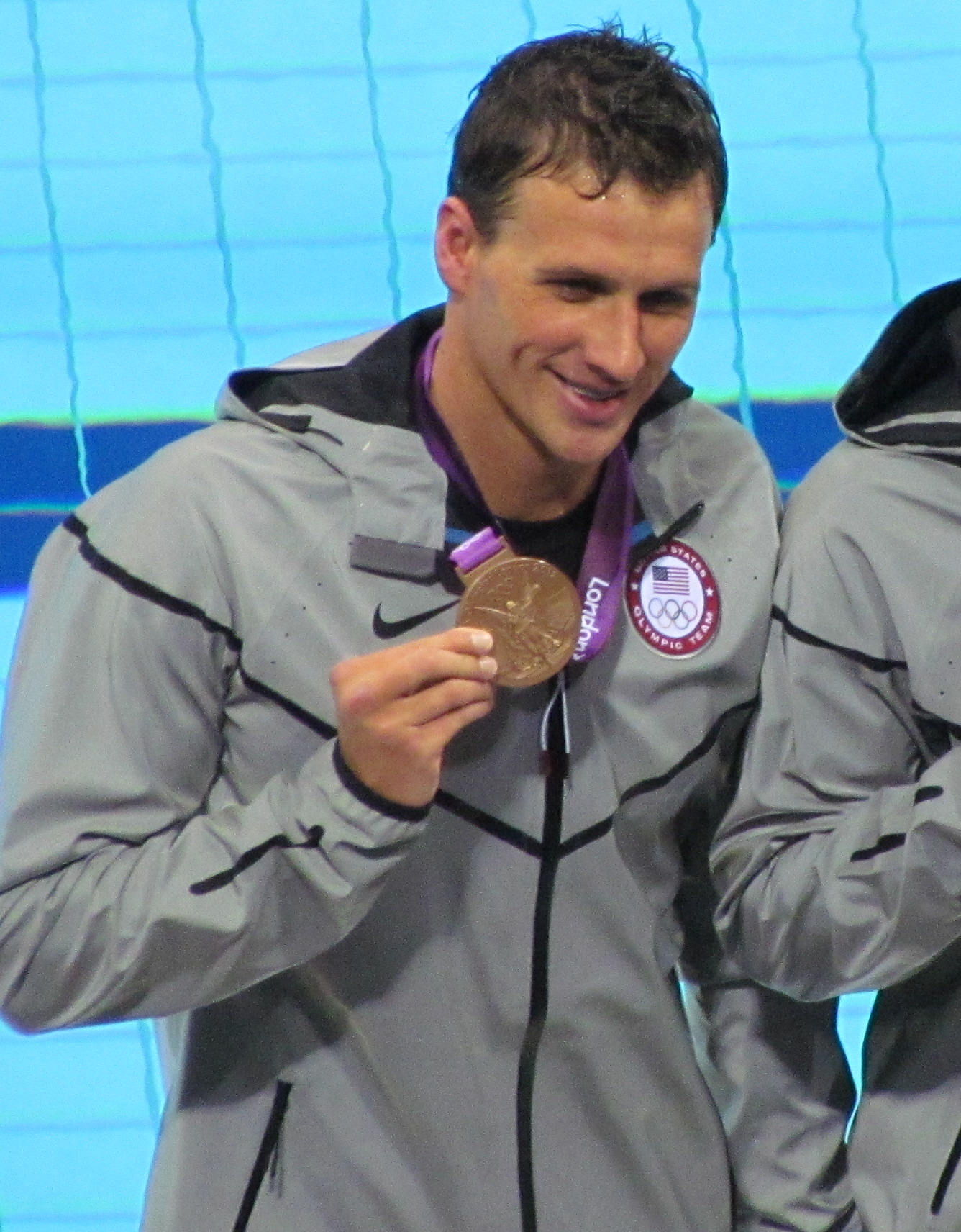
Lochte after the 200m backstroke

At the Olympics in London, Lochte won his first gold medal of the games in the 400-meter individual medley with a time of 4:05.18. Commenting on his first medal of the 2012 Olympics and head-to-head competition with fellow American and world record holder, Michael Phelps, Lochte acknowledged Phelps' greatness while positioning himself as "the best today."

Lochte won a silver medal with the U.S. 4×100-meter freestyle relay team, losing out to the French team with a 47.74 split, a full second slower than the French finishing swimmer Yannick Agnel and six tenths of a second slower than teammate Phelps.

Lochte placed fourth in the 200-meter freestyle race. He followed that performance, however, by winning gold with the U.S. 4×200-meter freestyle team. Lochte swam the first split and provided the U.S. team a commanding lead, which it never relinquished.

On the sixth night of the Games, Lochte swam his last two finals, with only 30 minutes in between. First, he won the bronze medal in the 200m backstroke, finishing behind compatriot Tyler Clary and Japan's Ryosuke Irie. His time of 1.53.94 tied the time he swam four years ago when he won the gold medal at the 2008 Games, which was then a world record. Half an hour later, Lochte took on Phelps in the 200m individual medley. He won a silver medal behind Phelps in what was thought at the time to be the last head-to-head race of their careers, as Phelps retired after the Games. This was the third consecutive Olympics in which Lochte won a medal in the 200m individual medley.

His five medals brought his total to 11 Olympic medals, tied for second among male swimmers with compatriots Mark Spitz and Matt Biondi, behind only Phelps. His seven individual Olympic medals are the second-most in men's Olympic swimming, surpassing Zoltán Halmay and Mark Spitz, who won six.

=== 2013 World Championships ===
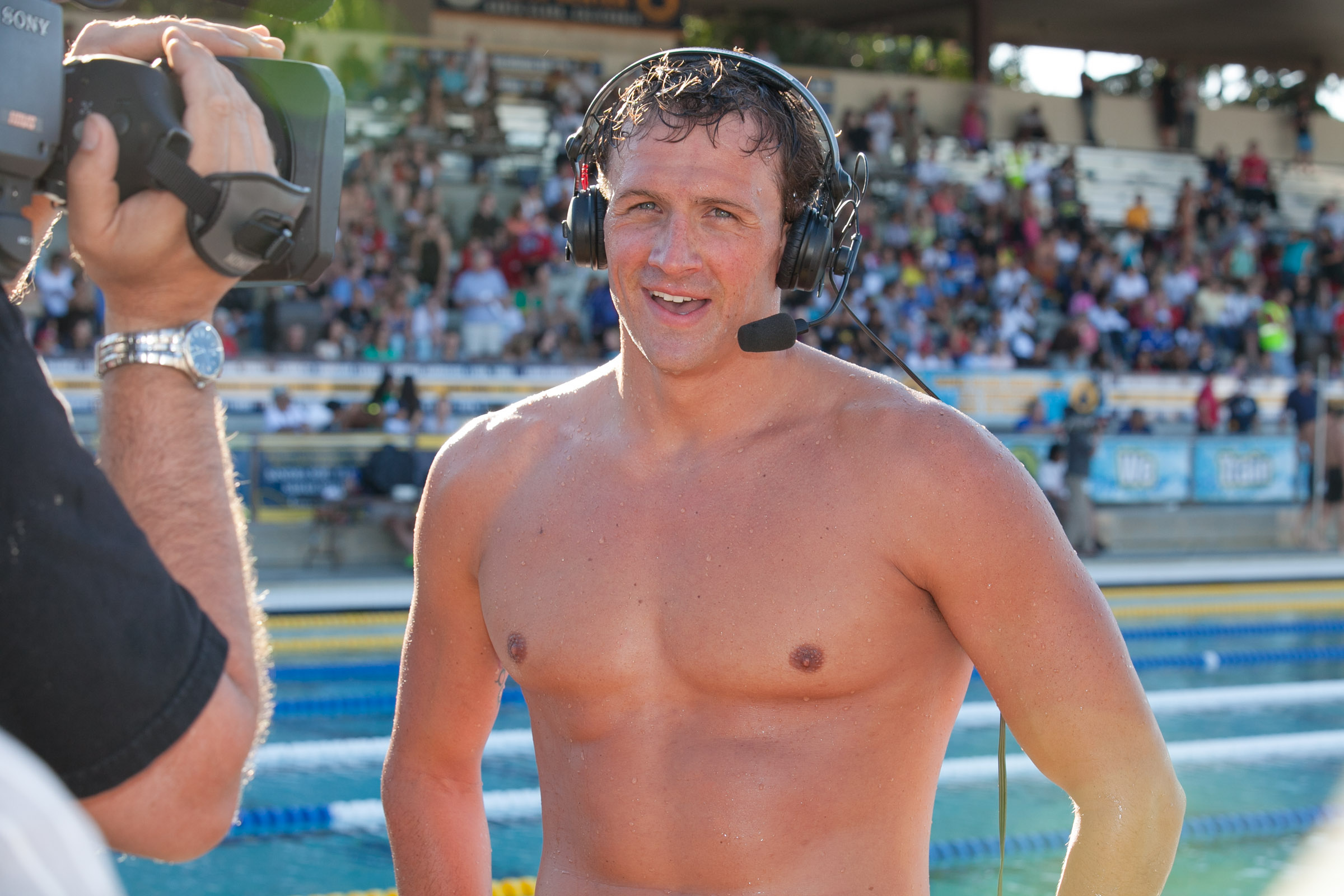
Lochte in 2013

In his first event at the 2013 World Aquatics Championships in Barcelona, Lochte combined with Nathan Adrian, Anthony Ervin, and Jimmy Feigen in the 4×100-meter freestyle relay, with the team finishing behind France. Swimming the second leg, Lochte recorded a split of 47.80, and the team finished with a final time of 3:11.44. In his first individual event, the 200-meter freestyle, Lochte was unsuccessful in defending his title and placed fourth in the final with a time of 1:45.64. Lochte won his first individual medal of the competition, a gold, by defending his title in the 200-meter individual medley, recording a time of 1:54.98. The day following his 200 medley gold, Lochte also defended his title in the 200-meter backstroke, recording a time of 1:53.79 in the final. On the same day of winning the 200-meter backstroke (and swimming in the 100-meter butterfly semifinals where he set a personal best and qualified for the final), Lochte combined with Conor Dwyer, Charlie Houchin, and Ricky Berens, to win the 4×200-meter freestyle relay. Swimming the second leg, Lochte recorded a split of 1:44.98, and the team finished with a final time of 7:01.72. In winning the 4×200 relay, Lochte became the first swimmer to win 5 consecutive gold medals at the World Championships in the 4×200-meter freestyle relay (while also being the first swimmer, along with compatriot Michael Phelps, to win the 4×200-meter freestyle relay Olympic Gold Medal on 3 successive occasions).

The next day, Lochte competed in the 100-meter butterfly and finished 6th in the final with a time of 51.58, just off his semifinal time of 51.48.

=== 2015 World Championships ===
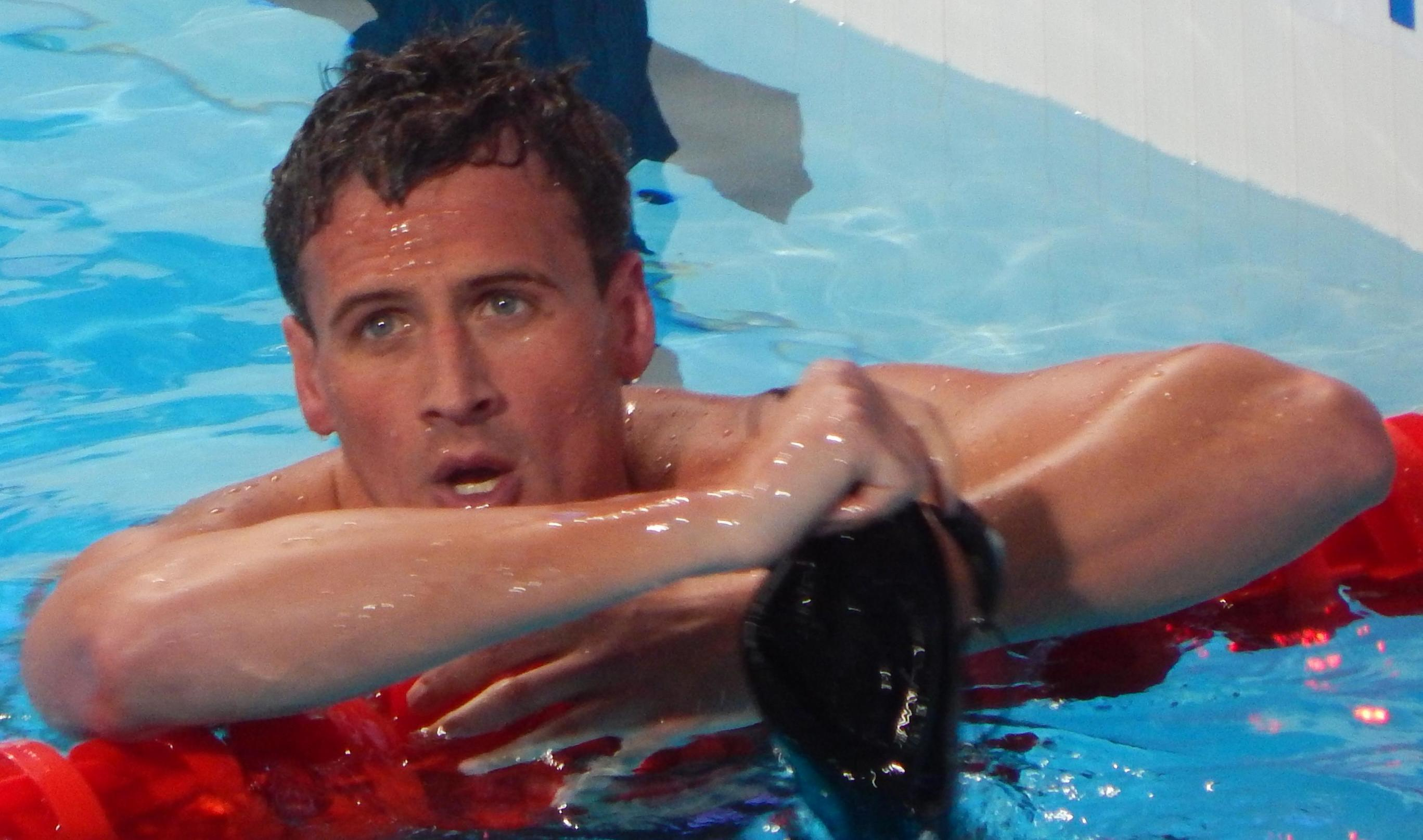
Lochte after the 200m freestyle semifinal

Lochte competed in his sixth World Championships in Kazan in 2015. He made history upon his win in the 200-meter individual medley by becoming the only person other than Grant Hackett to successfully win an event in four consecutive world championships. However, he finished a disappointing fourth in the 200-meter freestyle in 1:45.83, just off the podium. In addition, Lochte also won three relay medals. Lochte led off the 4×200-meter freestyle relay in 1:45.71, but the US team could not hold on as Great Britain pulled off a great upset and beat the US team 7:04.33 to 7:04.75. Alongside Nathan Adrian, Simone Manuel, and Missy Franklin, he was also part of the winning and world record-breaking 4×100-meter mixed freestyle relay. Lochte also anchored the prelim team for the 4×100-meter medley relay and received a gold medal for his efforts since the finals team won.

=== 2016 Summer Olympics ===
==== Olympic Trials ====
At the 2016 United States Olympic Trials, the U.S. qualifying meet for the Rio Olympics, Lochte finished third in the 400-meter individual medley, just missing out on an Olympic berth. In the 200-meter freestyle, he missed his second chance at making the team in an individual event by placing fourth; nonetheless, he earned a relay spot in the 4×200-meter freestyle relay. Lochte finally qualified for an individual event by finishing second in the 200-meter individual medley behind Phelps.

==== Olympics ====
Medal record

2016 Rio – Men's swimming

Representing the USA
Gold medal – first place	4×200 m freestyle relay	7:00.66

Lochte's first event in Rio was the 4×200 meter freestyle relay, where he swam both the morning heats and the finals. In the finals, Lochte swam the third leg after Conor Dwyer and Townley Haas. After Lochte's leg, the U.S. had a commanding lead. Phelps anchored the relay to touch the wall first at 7:00.66. This brought Lochte's Olympic medal count up to 12 total, making him the second most decorated male Olympic swimmer of all time, second only to Phelps.

Lochte finished 5th in the 200-meter individual medley. This was his 4th consecutive final in the event, and the first time he did not win a medal.

==== Lochtegate ====
On the morning of August 14, 2016, Lochte and Jimmy Feigen claimed that they and teammates Gunnar Bentz and Jack Conger were robbed in Rio de Janeiro, Brazil, during the 2016 Summer Olympics after men forced them out of their taxi at gunpoint in the early morning hours. Lochte also alleged that a gun had been put up against his head. A police report stated that one or more of the athletes had vandalized the gas station bathroom and damaged a sign on the premises, though investigative reporters found that the athletes had damaged the sign but had neither entered the bathroom nor damaged items in the bathroom. Some of the swimmers were detained in Brazil as witnesses. Ultimately, the athletes each released statements. Lochte later stated in an interview that he had been drunk and that he "over-exaggerated that story". However, his amended story raised concerns about the facts, and a witness who also translated between the security guards and the athletes claimed that the swimmers had stopped to use the fuel station's bathroom, damaged the sign on the premises, and that he stepped in when it was obvious that events could get out of control. He noted that all sides understood that the money was being paid to cover the damage done, but also that Lochte was drunk or "very altered" at the time of the incident.

In August 2016, Lochte was charged with providing a false claim of a robbery during the 2016 Olympic Games, and if convicted could be jailed up to 18 months. The charges were later dismissed by a court, which stated that Lochte's actions "did not rise to the level of filing a false crime report." On August 30, 2016, when appearing on Good Morning America, he said that he was unsure how he would classify the incident, stating, "I don't know if I would consider it as a robbery, or extortion, or us just paying up for the poster being ripped." Investigative reporting by USA Today, which reviewed the security camera tapes, showed that Lochte and the other swimmers did not enter the bathroom that they were accused of vandalizing, and that the items purportedly damaged inside the bathroom were neither damaged nor recently replaced.

Lochte apologized for the gas station dispute. In the aftermath of the incident, USA Swimming suspended Lochte from domestic and international competitions for 10 months. Lochte was also dropped by all four of his major sponsors. However, by January 2017, TYR announced an apparel deal with Lochte.

=== 2018 suspension ===
On July 23, 2018, the United States Anti-Doping Agency (USADA) imposed a 14-month suspension from competition on Lochte because, on May 24 of that year, he received a 'prohibited intravenous infusion.' "I have never taken a prohibitive [sic] substance," Lochte told the media, "I have never attempted to gain any advantage by putting anything illegal in my body...I may be on the sideline from competition, but I'll continue to train every day...I want nothing more than to earn the privilege to swim for my country in my fifth Olympic Games in Tokyo 2020."

On May 24, 2018, the same day he had received the infusion, Lochte had posted a picture - since deleted - on Instagram "showing him receiving an intravenous injection of what he says were 'vitamins'," even though the USADA bans "intravenous infusions of permitted substances at volumes greater than 100 millilitres [3.5 imp fl oz; 3.4 US fl oz] in a 12-hour period without a special 'Therapeutic Use Exemption'," Vox reported.

=== 2021 ===
On June 17, 2021, the fifth day of competition at the 2020 USA Swimming Olympic Trials, Lochte swam a 1:58.48 in the morning prelims of the 200-meter individual medley, ranking second and qualifying for the semifinals. In the evening semifinals, he swam a 1:58.65 ranking sixth and qualifying for the final. In the final, Lochte finished seventh with a time of 1:59.67 and not qualifying for the 2020 Summer Olympics in the event. In Michael Andrew's post-win interview for the 200-meter individual medley final, Lochte joined Andrew and called him family along with the swimming community. Lochte also said missing out on the Olympic Team was not the end of the road for him.

A few days after the end of the US Olympic Trials, Lochte confirmed he was still committed to the sport of swimming, both in terms of competing and growing the sport, and he was not retiring. He added that one of his swimming pursuits moving forward included teaching youth how to swim.

== Television appearances and pop culture fame ==
=== Magazines ===
Before the 2012 Summer Olympics, Fortune magazine estimated that Lochte earned $2.3 million from endorsement deals with Speedo, Mutual of Omaha, Gillette, Gatorade, Procter and Gamble, Ralph Lauren, Nissan, and AT&T. Lochte has also appeared in commercials for the Nissan Altima and been featured on the covers of Vogue, Time, Men's Health, and Men's Journal.

=== Television ===
Comedian Seth MacFarlane parodied Lochte in the 2012 season premiere of Saturday Night Live, after which Lochte said he would be open to doing a cameo appearance on the show.

Lochte appeared as an exaggerated version of himself in the 30 Rock episode "Stride of Pride", which aired October 18, 2012. He also had a guest appearance on 90210 in late 2012.

What Would Ryan Lochte Do? began airing April 21, 2013, on E! and was cancelled after only one season, five weeks later. Lochte's public persona and character have inspired a series of unflattering Internet memes.

On August 30, 2016, Lochte was announced as one of the celebrities who would compete on season 23 of Dancing with the Stars. He was partnered with professional dancer Cheryl Burke. Lochte and Burke were eliminated on Week 8 of competition, finishing in 7th place.

In 2017, Lochte played a supporting role in Little Something for Your Birthday.

On January 13, 2019, the reality game show Celebrity Big Brother announced that Lochte would be a houseguest in the second American season of the show. He finished in 10th place after 13 days.

On the Family Guy season 17 episode "Griffin Winter Games", Peter Griffin meets Lochte at a party for the athletes of the Korean winter Olympics where he asks him, "wait, aren't you a summer sport guy?" As Lochte offers him a beer, a narrator imitating Morgan Freeman refers to him as an 'international bozo' and notes that Peter partied with him all night.

On September 22, 2019, Lochte appeared on Celebrity Family Feud along with his wife Kayla. Lochte won the family be family round, and between Kayla and himself they scored over 200 points in the final round to win the game.

On November 13, 2019, Ryan appeared on an episode of "Back in the Game" with Alex Rodriguez. The series focuses on Rodriguez mentoring athletes and entertainers who have fallen on hard times. In the episode Alex helps Lochte get his finances back on track.

On January 12, 2023, Ryan appeared on the show The Traitors. He finished in 14th place after being "murdered" by the traitors in episode 5.

On November 9, 2026, Ryan appeared on Celebrity Weakest Link. Ryan was the first contestant voted off.

=== Radio ===
National Public Radio named Lochte as their "platonic ideal of bro-dom".

== Awards ==
Year	Group	Award	Result	Notes
2013	Teen Choice Awards	Choice TV: Male Reality/Variety Star	Nominated	What Would Ryan Lochte Do?

== Personal life ==
=== Trademark application ===
On August 1, 2012, Lochte filed an application to trademark his personal catchphrase, "Jeah", with the U.S. Patent & Trademark Office. He abandoned the application before it was finalized.

=== Sponsorships ===
In January 2017, active-wear maker TYR Sport, Inc. signed Lochte to his first major professional swimming sponsorship deal since the Lochtegate scandal.

In November 2019, Lochte revealed to Alex Rodriguez on an episode of CNBC's Back In The Game that he once made "well over $1 million" a year and also earned $75,000 from a single sponsor. However, he also stated to Rodriguez that his scandals – which resulted in his suspension and losing his sponsors – and lavish spending resulted in him suffering significant financial losses. He was forced to sell his 4,200 square feet (390 m^{2}) home and now resides in a 1,800 square feet (170 m^{2}) apartment. He also estimated that he had only about $20,000 in savings.

=== Protests ===
In July 2021, Lochte spoke about his stance not supporting protests at athletic events in advance of the 2020 Summer Olympics. This reiterated sentiments Lochte shared concerning the safety and security of individuals after protesters targeting him stormed the stage during one of his performances on the television show Dancing with the Stars in September 2016.

=== Marriage and fatherhood ===
During the 2016 Summer Olympics, Lochte revealed that he was in a relationship with Playboy Playmate of the Month for July 2015 Kayla Rae Reid, whom he first got in touch with via Instagram. They became engaged in October 2016, and were married in an at-home civil ceremony in January 2018. The couple have three children together. In March 2025, Kayla filed for divorce from Lochte.

=== Selling his medals ===
Ryan Lochte has sold nine of his 12 Olympic medals. In 2022, he sold his six bronze and silver medals for $166,000. In 2026, Lochte auctioned off three more medals through Goldin Auctions, bringing in $385,520. The three additional medals were three Olympic gold medals he won in relay events: 4×200 m freestyle relay from Athens 2004, 4×200 m freestyle relay from Beijing 2008, and 4×200 m freestyle relay from Rio 2016.

== Career best times ==
=== Long course meters (50 m pool) ===
Event	Time		Meet	Location	Date	Notes
100 m freestyle	48.16	h	2009 U.S National Championships	Indianapolis, Indiana, United States	July 10, 2009	
200 m freestyle	1:44.44		2011 World Championships	Shanghai, China	July 26, 2011	
50 m backstroke	25.68	h	2007 World Championships	Melbourne, Australia	March 31, 2007	
100 m backstroke	53.37	sf	2008 U.S. Olympic Trials	Omaha, Nebraska, United States	June 30, 2008	
100 m backstroke	53.37		2008 U.S. Olympic Trials	Omaha, Nebraska, United States	July 1, 2008	
200 m backstroke	1:52.96		2011 World Championships	Shanghai, China	July 29, 2011	
100 m butterfly	51.48	sf	2013 World Championships	Barcelona, Spain	August 2, 2013	
200 m individual medley	1:54.00		2011 World Championships	Shanghai, China	July 28, 2011	AM, Former WR
400 m individual medley	4:05.18		2012 Summer Olympics	London, United Kingdom	July 28, 2012	

Legend: WR – World record; e – equalled existing record;
Records not set in finals: h – heat; sf – semifinal; r – relay 1st leg; rh – relay heat 1st leg; b – B final; † – en route to final mark; so – swim-off; tt – time trial

=== Short course meters (25 m pool) ===
Event	Time		Meet	Location	Date	Notes
50 m freestyle	21.44		2008 World Championships (25m)	Manchester, United Kingdom	April 11, 2008	
100 m freestyle	47.09	r	2008 World Championships (25m)	Manchester, United Kingdom	April 9, 2008	
200 m freestyle	1:41.08		2010 World Championships (25m)	Dubai, United Arab Emirates	December 15, 2010	Former NR
100 m backstroke	49.99	r	2006 World Championships (25m)	Shanghai, China	April 9, 2006	Former WR
200 m backstroke	1:46.68		2010 World Championships (25m)	Dubai, United Arab Emirates	December 19, 2010	AM
50 m breaststroke	27.25	sf	2008 World Championships (25m)	Manchester, United Kingdom	April 12, 2008	
100 m breaststroke	58.98	h	2008 World Championships (25m)	Manchester, United Kingdom	April 9, 2008	
100 m butterfly	49.59		2012 World Championships (25m)	Istanbul, Turkey	December 13, 2012	
100 m individual medley	50.71	sf	2012 World Championships (25m)	Istanbul, Turkey	December 15, 2012	Former WR
200 m individual medley	1:49.63		2012 World Championships (25m)	Istanbul, Turkey	December 14, 2012	Former WR
400 m individual medley	3:55.50		2010 World Championships (25m)	Dubai, United Arab Emirates	December 16, 2010	AM, Former WR

Legend: WR – World record; AM – Americas record; NR – American record; e – equalled existing record;
Records not set in finals: h – heat; sf – semifinal; r – relay 1st leg; rh – relay heat 1st leg; b – B final; † – en route to final mark; so – swim-off; tt – time trial

== World records ==
=== Long course (50 m pool) ===
No.	Event	Time	Meet	Location	Date	Status
1	200 m backstroke	1:54.32	2007 World Championships	Melbourne, Australia	March 30, 2007	Former
2	4×200 m freestyle relay^{[a]}	7:03.24	2007 World Championships	Melbourne, Australia	March 30, 2007	Former
3	4×200 m freestyle relay (2)^{[b]}	6:58.56	2008 Summer Olympics	Beijing, China	August 13, 2008	Former
4	200 m backstroke (2)	1:53.94	2008 Summer Olympics	Beijing, China	August 15, 2008	Former
5	200 m individual medley	1:54.10	2009 World Championships	Rome, Italy	July 30, 2009	Former
6	4×200 m freestyle relay (3)^{[c]}	6:58.55	2009 World Championships	Rome, Italy	July 31, 2009	Current
7	200 m individual medley (2)	1:54.00	2011 World Championships	Shanghai, China	July 28, 2011	Former
8	4×100 m mixed freestyle relay^{[d]}	3:23.05	2015 World Championships	Kazan, Russia	August 8, 2015	Former

a. with Michael Phelps, Klete Keller and Peter Vanderkaay
b. with Michael Phelps, Ricky Berens and Peter Vanderkaay
c. with Michael Phelps, Ricky Berens and David Walters
d. with Nathan Adrian, Simone Manuel and Missy Franklin

=== Short course (25 m pool) ===
No.	Event	Time		Meet	Location	Date	Status
1	200 m individual medley	1:53.31		2006 World Championships (25m)	Shanghai, China	April 7, 2006	Former
2	200 m backstroke	1:49.05		2006 World Championships (25m)	Shanghai, China	April 9, 2006	Former
3	100 m backstroke	49.99	r	2006 World Championships (25m)	Shanghai, China	April 9, 2006	Former
4	4×100 m freestyle relay^{[e]}	3:08.44		2008 World Championships (25m)	Manchester, United Kingdom	April 9, 2008	Former
5	200 m individual medley (2)	1:51.56		2008 World Championships (25m)	Manchester, United Kingdom	April 11, 2008	Former
6	100 m individual medley	51.25	sf	2008 World Championships (25m)	Manchester, United Kingdom	April 12, 2008	Former
7	100 m individual medley (2)	51.15		2008 World Championships (25m)	Manchester, United Kingdom	April 13, 2008	Former
8	400 m individual medley	3:55.50		2010 World Championships (25m)	Dubai, United Arab Emirates	December 16, 2010	Former
9	200 m individual medley (3)	1:50.08		2010 World Championships (25m)	Dubai, United Arab Emirates	December 17, 2010	Former
10	200 m individual medley (4)	1:49.63		2012 World Championships (25m)	Istanbul, Turkey	December 14, 2012	Former
11	100 m individual medley (3)	50.71	sf	2012 World Championships (25m)	Istanbul, Turkey	December 15, 2012	Former

Legend: e – equalled existing record;
Records not set in finals: h – heat; sf – semifinal; r – relay 1st leg; rh – relay heat 1st leg; b – B final; † – en route to final mark; so – swim-off; tt – time trial

e. with Bryan Lundquist, Nathan Adrian and Doug Van Wie

== See also ==
- List of multiple Olympic gold medalists
- List of multiple Olympic gold medalists in one event
- List of Olympic medalists in swimming (men)
- List of top Olympic gold medalists in swimming
- List of multiple Summer Olympic medalists
- List of United States records in swimming
- List of University of Florida alumni
- List of University of Florida Olympians
- List of World Aquatics Championships medalists in swimming (men)
- List of individual gold medalists in swimming at the Olympics and World Aquatics Championships (men)
- World record progression 100 metres backstroke
- World record progression 100 metres individual medley
- World record progression 200 metres backstroke
- World record progression 200 metres individual medley
- World record progression 400 metres individual medley
- World record progression 4 × 100 metres freestyle relay
- World record progression 4 × 200 metres freestyle relay

Records
Preceded by László Cseh; László Cseh; Darian Townsend	Men's 200-meter medley world record-holder (short course); April 7, 2006 – November 18, 2007; April 11, 2008 – November 15, 2009; December 17, 2010 – present	Succeeded by Thiago Pereira; Darian Townsend; Incumbent
Preceded by Peter Marshall	Men's 100-meter backstroke world record-holder (short course); April 9, 2006 – November 11, 2008	Succeeded by Peter Marshall
Preceded by Markus Rogan	Men's 200-meter backstroke world record-holder (short course); April 9, 2006 – April 13, 2008	Succeeded by Markus Rogan
Preceded by Aaron Peirsol; Aaron Peirsol (tie)	Men's 200-meter backstroke world record-holder (long course); March 30, 2007 – July 4, 2008; August 15, 2008 – July 11, 2009	Succeeded by Aaron Peirsol (tie); Aaron Peirsol
Preceded by Ryk Neethling; Peter Mankoč	Men's 100-meter medley world record-holder (short course); April 12, 2008 – November 14, 2009; December 15, 2012 – December 7, 2014	Succeeded by Sergey Fesikov; Markus Deibler
Preceded by Michael Phelps	Men's 200-meter medley world record-holder (long course); July 30, 2009 – July 30, 2025	Succeeded by Léon Marchand
Preceded by László Cseh	Men's 400-meter medley world record-holder (short course); December 16, 2010 – December 20, 2019	Succeeded by Daiya Seto
Awards
Preceded by Michael Phelps	World Swimmer of the Year; 2010–2011	Succeeded by Michael Phelps
Preceded by First award Michael Phelps	FINA Swimmer of the Year; 2010, 2011; 2013	Succeeded by Michael Phelps; Chad le Clos
Preceded by Michael Phelps; Michael Phelps	American Swimmer of the Year; 2010–2011; 2013	Succeeded by Michael Phelps; Tyler Clary & Ryan Cochrane
