= Matt Grevers =

American swimmer (born 1985)

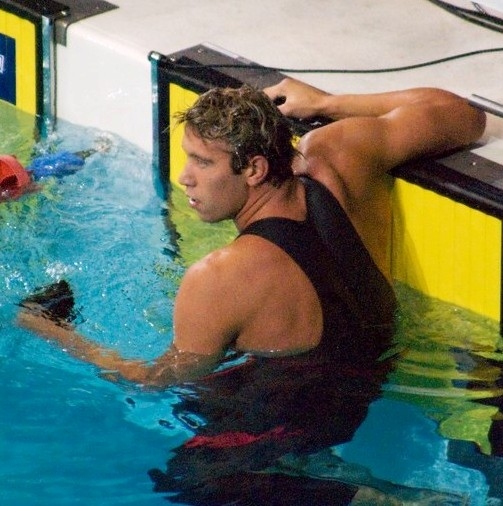
- Grevers in 2009

Personal information
- Full name: Matthew Grevers
- Nicknames: "Matt," "Dutch," "The Gentle Giant"
- National team: United States
- Born: March 26, 1985 (age 41) Lake Forest, Illinois, U.S.
- Height: 6 ft 8 in (203 cm)
- Weight: 240 lb (109 kg)
- Spouse: Annie Chandler

Sport
- Sport: Swimming
- Strokes: Backstroke, freestyle, butterfly
- Club: Patriot Aquatics SC; Tucson Ford Dealers Aquatics
- College team: Northwestern University
- Coach: Lea Maurer (Patriot Aquatics); Bob Groseth (Northwestern); Rick Demont (Tucson Ford)
Medal record
Men's swimming
Representing United States
Event	1st	2nd	3rd
Olympic Games	4	2	0
World Championships (LC)	6	5	2
World Championships (SC)	6	5	4
Pan Pacific Championships	1	1	0
Universiade	1	3	2
Total	18	16	8
Olympic Games
Gold medal – first place	2008 Beijing	4×100 m freestyle
Gold medal – first place	2008 Beijing	4×100 m medley
Gold medal – first place	2012 London	100 m backstroke
Gold medal – first place	2012 London	4×100 m medley
Silver medal – second place	2008 Beijing	100 m backstroke
Silver medal – second place	2012 London	4×100 m freestyle
World Championships (LC)
Gold medal – first place	2009 Rome	4×100 m freestyle
Gold medal – first place	2009 Rome	4×100 m medley
Gold medal – first place	2013 Barcelona	100 m backstroke
Gold medal – first place	2015 Kazan	4×100 m medley
Gold medal – first place	2017 Budapest	4×100 m medley
Gold medal – first place	2017 Budapest	4×100 m mixed medley
Silver medal – second place	2013 Barcelona	50 m backstroke
Silver medal – second place	2015 Kazan	50 m backstroke
Silver medal – second place	2017 Budapest	100 m backstroke
Silver medal – second place	2019 Gwangju	4×100 m medley
Silver medal – second place	2019 Gwangju	4×100 m mixed medley
Bronze medal – third place	2015 Kazan	100 m backstroke
Bronze medal – third place	2017 Budapest	50 m backstroke
World Championships (SC)
Gold medal – first place	2012 Istanbul	100 m backstroke
Gold medal – first place	2012 Istanbul	4×100 m freestyle
Gold medal – first place	2012 Istanbul	4×100 m medley
Gold medal – first place	2014 Doha	4×50 m mixed freestyle
Gold medal – first place	2018 Hangzhou	4×100 m freestyle
Gold medal – first place	2018 Hangzhou	4×100 m medley
Silver medal – second place	2006 Shanghai	4×100 m medley
Silver medal – second place	2012 Istanbul	50 m backstroke
Silver medal – second place	2014 Doha	4×50 m freestyle
Silver medal – second place	2014 Doha	4×100 m medley
Silver medal – second place	2018 Hangzhou	4×50 m medley
Bronze medal – third place	2006 Shanghai	4×100 m freestyle
Bronze medal – third place	2014 Doha	100 m backstroke
Bronze medal – third place	2014 Doha	4×100 m freestyle
Bronze medal – third place	2014 Doha	4×50 m medley
Pan Pacific Championships
Gold medal – first place	2014 Gold Coast	4×100 m medley
Silver medal – second place	2014 Gold Coast	100 m backstroke
Universiade
Gold medal – first place	2007 Bangkok	4×100 m freestyle
Silver medal – second place	2005 Izmir	100 m backstroke
Silver medal – second place	2005 Izmir	4×100 m medley
Silver medal – second place	2007 Bangkok	4×100 m medley
Bronze medal – third place	2005 Izmir	50 m backstroke
Bronze medal – third place	2005 Izmir	4×100 m freestyle
Representing the Northwestern Wildcats
Event	1st	2nd	3rd
NCAA Championships	4	1	2
Total	4	1	2
By race
Event	1st	2nd	3rd
100 y backstroke	2	0	1
200 y backstroke	1	0	0
200 y medley	0	1	0
4×100 y freestyle	0	0	1
4×100 y medley	1	0	0
Total	4	1	2
NCAA Championships
Gold medal – first place	2005 Minneapolis	100 y backstroke
Gold medal – first place	2006 Atlanta	100 y backstroke
Gold medal – first place	2007 Minneapolis	200 y backstroke
Gold medal – first place	2007 Minneapolis	4×100 y medley
Silver medal – second place	2007 Minneapolis	200 y medley
Bronze medal – third place	2007 Minneapolis	100 y backstroke
Bronze medal – third place	2007 Minneapolis	4×100 y freestyle

Matthew Grevers (born March 26, 1985) is a former American competition swimmer who competed in the backstroke and freestyle events, and is a six-time Olympic medalist. He has won a total of thirty-three medals in major international competition, fourteen gold, twelve silver, and seven bronze spanning the Olympics, World Championships, and the Universiade. At the 2008 Summer Olympics, Grevers won gold medals as a member of the U.S. teams in the 4×100-meter freestyle and 4×100-meter medley relays, and a silver medal in the 100-meter backstroke. Four years later, at the 2012 Summer Olympics, he won gold medals in the 100-meter backstroke and the 4×100-meter medley relay, and a silver medal in the 4×100-meter freestyle relay.

== Early life and swimming ==
Born on March 26, 1985, in Lake Forest, Illinois, to Ed and Anja Grevers, a swim coach, he attended Lake Forest High School. One of the younger competitive swimmers in the family, older sister Carolyn swam for the University of Kansas, while older brother Andrew swam for Northern Illinois. Recognized early for his potential at High School meets, he set a national backstroke record at ten. At Lake Forest, he set three Illinois state records and in his Senior year in 2003 made significant contributions to Lake Forest's first Illinois State Team Championship. During his High School years, he competed and trained with Patriot Aquatics Swim Club at Illinois's Stevenson High School under accomplished coach Lea Maurer, a 1992 Olympic gold medalist who served as an Assistant Coach at Northwestern, and would later coach at Stanford. Completed in 1996, the club featured one of the first and most modern natatoriums in the state.

== Northwestern University ==
Beginning as a Freshman swimmer with Northwestern University in the fall of 2003, Grevers was a Big 10 Freshman of the Year, and became the first Northwestern Wildcat swimmer since 1958 to capture a national championship when he finished ahead of Ryan Lochte of Florida in the 100 backstroke at the 2005 NCAA championships. At Northwestern, he was a 27-time All American, and was trained and managed by Coach Bob Groseth. He won three individual NCAA titles during his time at Northwestern, and captured a fourth NCAA national championship with Northwestern's 400 medley relay team in 2007.

He repeated as the winner of the NCAA 100 backstroke title in 2006, then captured a first in the 200 backstroke, becoming only the third swimmer in the history of the NCAA history to swim under a time of 1:40 in the event.

A 2006 Big Ten Swimmer of the Year, he graduated Northwestern with three Big Ten Conference records, 11 Northwestern University records and 10 Norris Aquatics Center pool records.

== 2008 Olympics ==
At the 2008 Summer Olympics in Beijing, China, Grevers won two gold medals by swimming in the preliminary heats of the 4×100-meter freestyle relay and 4×100-meter medley relay (swimming the backstroke leg) as the Americans went on to win the finals in those events and medals are awarded to participants at any step along the way. Grevers also won an individual silver medal in the 100-meter backstroke in a time of 53.11-second, 0.57 of a second behind the winner, world record holder Aaron Peirsol.

=== 2009 World Aquatics ===
At the 2009 World Aquatics Championships, Grevers was part of the U.S. men's 4×100-meter freestyle relay team who took the gold ahead of Russia and France. Grevers also earned a gold in the 4×100-meter medley relay for his contributions in the heats.

== 2012 Olympics ==
At the 2012 United States Olympic Trials, the qualifying meet for the 2012 Olympics, Grevers qualified for the U.S. Olympic team by finishing first in the 100-meter backstroke and third in the 100-meter freestyle. In the final of the 100-meter backstroke, Grevers recorded the fastest time in a textile suit and won in a time of 52.08 seconds, then the second-best effort of all time and just behind Aaron Peirsol's world record of 51.94. In the 100-meter freestyle, Grevers placed third with a time of 48.55, which ensured him a spot on the 4×100-meter freestyle relay. Grevers also competed in the 50-meter freestyle, and placed sixth in the final with a time of 22.09.

At the 2012 Summer Olympics in London, Grevers won a total of three medals: two golds and one silver. Grevers earned his first medal, a silver, by swimming for the second-place U.S. team in the preliminary heats of the 4×100-meter freestyle relay. In the final, the American team finished second behind France. Teaming with Jimmy Feigen, Ricky Berens, and Jason Lezak in the heats, Grevers swam the second leg and recorded a time of 47.59. After leading the heats (52.92) and semi-finals (52.66) of the 100-meter backstroke, Grevers won gold in the final of the 100-meter backstroke with a time of 52.16, bettering Aaron Peirsol's Olympic record of 52.54 set in 2008 and 0.76 seconds ahead of Nick Thoman. For Grevers, it was his first individual gold medal. In his final event, the 4×100-meter medley relay, Grevers won gold with Brendan Hansen, Michael Phelps and Nathan Adrian. Swimming the backstroke leg, Grevers recorded a time of 52.58 seconds, and the U.S. team went on to win with a time of 3:29.35.

=== 2013 World Championships ===
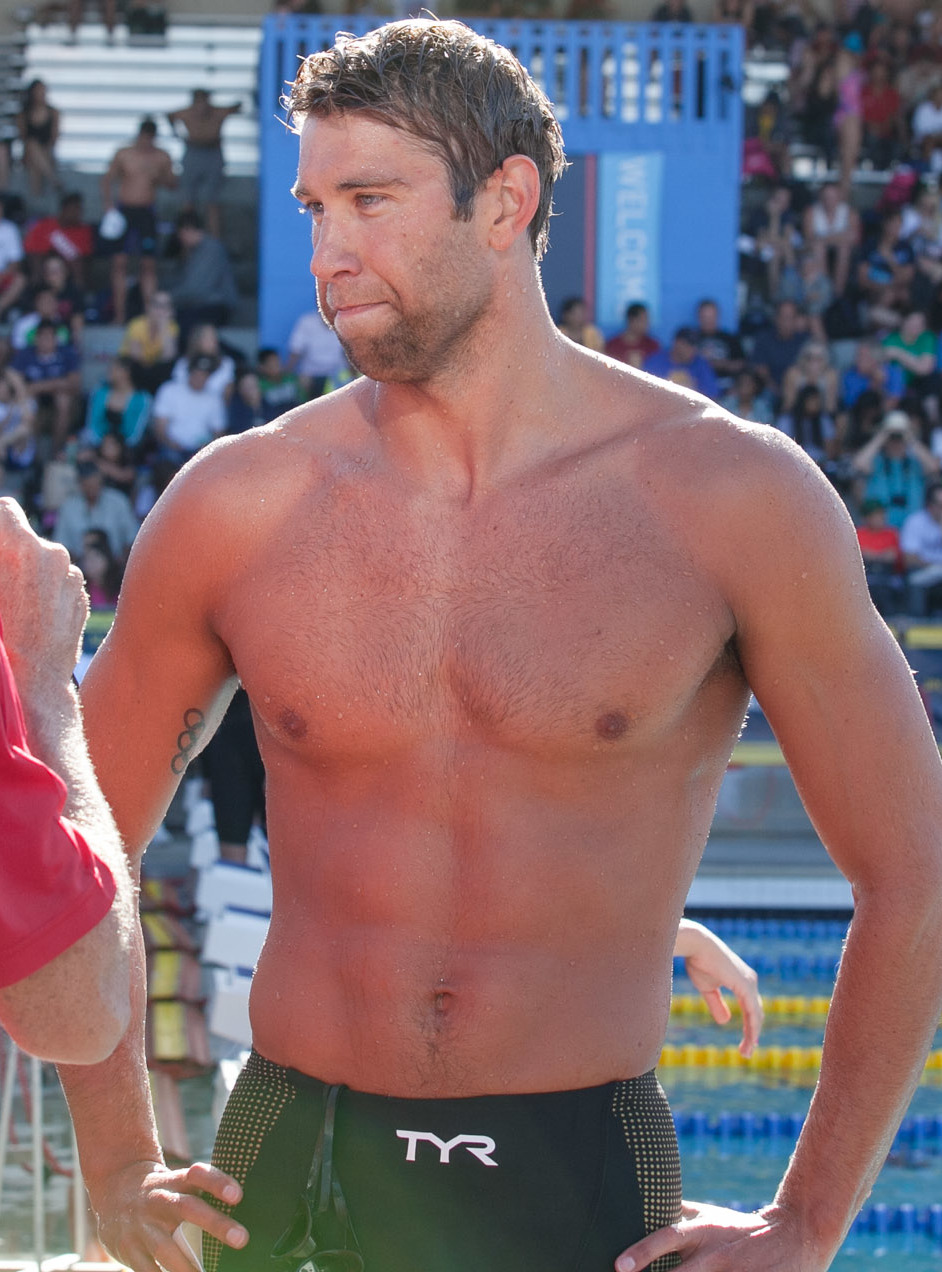
Grevers in 2013

At the 2013 FINA World Championships in Barcelona, Grevers achieved a total of two medals: a gold and a silver. On the first night of swimming, Grevers missed the top-eight championship finals roster in the 50-meter butterfly, as he finished his semi-final run with a twelfth-place time in 23.35. The following day, Grevers threw down the event's fastest time of 52.93 to claim the gold medal in the 100 m backstroke, finishing ahead of his teammate David Plummer by nearly two-tenths of a second. On the final night of the meet, Grevers swam his last two finals with only 45 minutes in between. First, he posted a matching time of 24.54 to share the silver medal with France's Jérémy Stravius in the 50 m backstroke. Nearly an hour later, Grevers teamed up with Kevin Cordes, Ryan Lochte, and Nathan Adrian for the final in the 4 × 100 m medley relay. During the race, Grevers swam the backstroke leg and touched the wall with a split of 53.02 until his teammate Cordes left the block 0.04 seconds early on the breaststroke leg, smashing the medal chances entirely for the Americans with a disastrous disqualification.

He did not make the 2016 Olympics Team as he finished third in the 100m backstroke.

=== 2017 World Championships ===
At the 2017 US National Championships, the qualifying meet for the 2017 World Championships in swimming, Grevers won the 100-meter backstroke, ahead of the 2016 Olympic champion and 100-meter backstroke world record holder, Ryan Murphy, to qualify the World Championships later that year in Budapest.

At the 2017 World Aquatics Championships in Budapest, Grevers placed second behind Xu Jiayu of China but ahead of Murphy in the 100-meter backstroke. He also earned gold medals by swimming in the heats and finals of the US 4x100-meter medley and mixed medley relays, as well as a bronze medal in the non-Olympic 50-meter backstroke. The mixed medley relay had also set a World and Championship record time of 3:38.56 in the finals.

=== Honors ===
While at Northwestern, Grevers was a Big 10 Freshman of the Year, and a Big Ten Swimmer of the Year in 2006. He was inducted into the Northwestern University Athletic Hall of Fame in 2012, and became a member of the Chicagoland Sports Hall of Fame in October, 2022.

== Personal life ==
Grevers was born in Lake Forest, Illinois. As noted previously, he graduated from Lake Forest High School in 2003, and subsequently attended Northwestern University while swimming for the Wildcats.

Both of Grevers's parents are from the Netherlands. Grevers considered representing the Netherlands and even spoke about it with Dutch swimming legend Pieter van den Hoogenband. Ultimately, he decided to represent the United States.

Grevers proposed to his wife, Annie Chandler, at the Missouri Grand Prix on Saturday, February 11, 2012. The couple were married on April 6, 2013, in San Antonio, Texas.

Annie gave birth to the couple's first child, a daughter, Skylar Lea Grevers, on November 9, 2016.

Grevers announcing the birth of his second child with Annie, made Swimming World Biweekly as one of two family lifestyle articles printed, the other being the engagement of Caeleb Dressel to Meghan Dressel. In December 2019, they had their second daughter together, Barbara Grace. His youngest child is son Gideon.

=== Coaching ===
As of 2024, Annie Chandler Grevers and husband Matt were still living in Tucson, Arizona with their three young children. Matt, who continued to train and attended the Olympic trials that year, was an Assistant volunteer coach at the University of Arizona, and worked for the DeMont Family Swim School, where he became a partner and co-owner in 2022 with Rick DeMont. DeMont, who had coached Grevers at Tucson Ford Aquatics for a decade, had operated the school with his wife Carrie since 2009, and had coached at the University of Arizona from 1987 to 2017. Staying active in the sport, Grevers attended the U.S. Olympic trials for all seven Olympics from 2000 to 2024.

== See also ==
- List of multiple Olympic gold medalists
- List of Northwestern University alumni
- List of Olympic medalists in swimming (men)
- List of United States records in swimming
- List of World Aquatics Championships medalists in swimming (men)
- World record progression 4 × 100 metres freestyle relay

Records
Preceded by Sergey Fesikov, Vladimir Morozov, Rozaliya Nasretdinova, Veronika Popova	Mixed 4 × 50 metres freestyle relay world record-holder December 6, 2014 – present With: Josh Schneider, Madison Kennedy, Abbey Weitzeil	Succeeded by Incumbents
Preceded by Nick Thoman	Men's 100-meter backstroke world record-holder (short course); December 12, 2015 – December 22, 2017	Succeeded by Kliment Kolesnikov
