= Eric la Fleur =

Swedish swimmer

Personal information
- Full name: Eric Johan Lennart la Fleur
- Nationality: Sweden
- Born: 11 December 1979 (age 46) Lund, Sweden
- Height: 1.91 m (6 ft 3 in)
- Weight: 78 kg (172 lb)

Sport
- Sport: Swimming
- Strokes: freestyle
- College team: Arizona Wildcats

Eric la Fleur (born 11 December 1979) is a Swedish former Olympic swimmer. He competed in the 2004 Summer Olympics, where he swam the 4×100 m freestyle relay preliminaries for the Swedish team that became disqualified.

== Biography ==
La Fleur was born on 11 December 1979 in Lund to parents Lennart and Barbro la Fleur. He started his swimming career in the Lund swimming team SK Poseidon. His brother, Oscar la Fleur, is also a former swimmer.

- 17-Time All American Div. 1 NCAA Swimming, swimming for University of Arizona, Tucson, AZ.
- Represented Sweden in World and European Championships.
- Silver medalist in 4×100 m freestyle relay in Moscow World Championship (short course) and Berlin European Championship (long course).
- Multiple Swedish champion.

== Clubs ==
- Malmö KK
- SK Poseidon, Lund
