= Jayme Cramer =

American competition swimmer

Personal information
- Full name: Jayme Oliver Cramer
- National team: United States
- Born: January 20, 1983 (age 43) Falls Church, Virginia, U.S.

Sport
- Sport: Swimming
- Strokes: Freestyle, Backstroke
- College team: Stanford University
Medal record
Men's swimming
Representing the United States
World Championships (LC)
Gold medal – first place	2005 Montreal	4×200 m freestyle
Gold medal – first place	2007 Melbourne	4×200 m freestyle
World Championships (SC)
Silver medal – second place	2006 Shanghai	4×100 m medley
Bronze medal – third place	2006 Shanghai	100 m butterfly
Bronze medal – third place	2006 Shanghai	4×200 m freestyle
Pan American Games
Bronze medal – third place	2003 Santo Domingo	100 m backstroke

Jayme Oliver Cramer (born January 20, 1983) is an American competition swimmer who specializes in backstroke and butterfly events. He has represented the United States as a member of the national swim team in the FINA world championships and the Pan American Games.

Cramer won the bronze medal in the men's 100-meter backstroke at the 2003 Pan American Games in Santo Domingo, Dominican Republic. Two years later, at the 2005 World Aquatics Championships (long-course) in Montreal, Quebec, he won gold medals in the 4×200-meter freestyle and 4×200-meter freestyle. At the 2006 short-course world championships in Shanghai, China, he won a silver medal in the 4x100-meter medley relay, and bronze medals in the 4x200-meter freestyle relay and 100-meter butterfly.

He is a 2001 graduate of St. Xavier High School in Cincinnati, Ohio.

Cramer now resides in Louisiana with his family, where he is the CFO and Head Coach for Crawfish Aquatics.
