= Ryan Wochomurka =

American swimmer (born 1983)

Current position
- Title: Head Coach
- Team: Auburn
- Conference: SEC

Biographical details
- Born: June 20, 1983 (age 43); Columbus, Indiana
- Education: Auburn

Playing career
- 2002-2005: Auburn

Coaching career (HC unless noted)
- 2007-2015: Louisville (Asst.)
- 2015-2021: Houston
- 2021-present: Auburn

Accomplishments and honors

Awards
- AAC Women's Swimming Coach of the Year (2017–2021)
Medal record
Representing United States
World Championships
Silver medal – second place	2003 Barcelona	4×100 m freestyle

Ryan Charles Wochomurka (born June 20, 1983) is a retired American swimmer who won a silver medal in the 4×100 m freestyle relay at the 2003 World Aquatics Championships. In 2004, he won the National Collegiate Athletic Association titles in the 4×50 and 4×100 m freestyle relays.

He was born to Chip and Jayne Wochomurka in Columbus, Indiana, and studied at the Columbus North High School and Auburn University. While at Auburn University Wochomurka was a member of three National Championship teams (2003, 2004, 2005). After retiring from swimming he graduated from the Auburn University in 2005, majoring in political science. He then worked as a recruitment representative for the swimwear manufacturer TYR Sport, Inc., then as the Associate Head Swimming Coach at the University of Louisville. In 2015, Wochomurka was hired to be the Head Swimming and Diving Coach at the University of Houston where he led the team to five straight conference titles. On April 23, 2021, Wochomurka returned to Auburn as the head swimming and diving coach.

Wochomurka and his wife, Leigh, have a son, Hayes, and a daughter, Hallie.
