= Bryce Hunt =

American swimmer (born 1982)

Personal information
- National team: United States
- Born: July 7, 1982 (age 44) Newburgh, Indiana, U.S.
- Height: 6 ft 2 in (1.88 m)
- Weight: 170 lb (77 kg)

Sport
- Sport: Swimming
- Strokes: Backstroke
- Club: Tri-State Aquatics; Auburn Aquatics
- College team: Auburn University
- Coach: David Marsh (Auburn)

Bryce Hunt (born July 7, 1982) is an American former competition swimmer who swam for Auburn University and represented the United States at the 2004 Summer Olympics in Athens, Greece in the 200 meter backstroke.

== Early swimming ==
Born in Newburgh, Indiana, on July 7, 1982, to Greg and Karen Hunt, Bryce took up competitive swimming at age six with the Newburgh Sea Creatures to build his lung capacity after suffering from stress-induced asthma. At 14, he attended Newburgh's John H. Castle High School, graduating in 2000, but swam for Steve Conder of the Tri-State Athletic Club, with intense training consisting of eight two hour practices a week. Indiana rules forbid Hunt from participating in United States Swimming Events and also swimming for his High School Swim team.

=== Backstroke records ===
He broke the 19-year-old standing record for the 200-meter backstroke with a time of 2:06.85 at the Junior National Championships in August 1996. As a top U.S. backstroker, Bryce was sent to train at Colorado Springs at age 15. At 16, he set the U.S. national record in the 200-meter back representing the U.S. Jr. Olympic team in Sheffield, England. In his Senior year at Castle High, Hunt was able to swim with his High School team, and broke the state record for the 100-yard backstroke with a time of 49.42 at the Indiana State High School Tournament. A versatile swimmer in his High School Senior year, he was ranked fifteenth in the world in the 200 freestyle.

=== Auburn University ===
He attended Auburn University, where he swam for the Auburn Tigers swimming and diving team in National Collegiate Athletic Association (NCAA) competition under Hall of Fame Head Coach David Marsh. Hunt placed first in the 200-backstroke, his signature event, at the Southeastern Conference Championships in February 2003, with a time of 1:41.73. At the November 2000 U.S. Open, Hunt placed third in the 200-meter backstroke with a time of 1:59.66, marking the highest place finish of any Auburn competitor. By his Sophomore year in November 2001 at Auburn, Hunt was an All American in backstroke events.

Auburn won the NCAA team championship in both the 2003 and 2004, in Hunt's Junior and Senior years. Winning the 2004 NCAA on March 27, 2004, Auburn's margin of victory over second place Stanford for the team championship was the second-largest margin of victory in NCAA history. In the 2004 NCAA Championship, in his Senior year at Auburn, Hunt placed fourth in the 100-meter butterfly with a time of 51.87 behind first place Ian Crocker of the university of Texas. More significantly, Hunt finished third at the 2004 NCAA Championships in the 200-backstroke with a 1:53.15, behind first place Aaron Peirsol who set a new world record of 1:50.64, finishing about 2.7 seconds ahead of Hunt.

Later in his career in international competition, Hunt was a member of the U.S. national team for the 2003 World Championships. At a high point in international competition, Hunt won a gold medal in the 2001 Summer Universiade in Beijing, China in the 200 meter backstroke.

== 2004 Olympics ==
In the 2004 Olympic Trials in Indianapolis, Hunt placed third behind Aaron Peirsol and Michael Phelps, but made the team after Phelps chose to bypass the event. In a press announcement, 2004 Olympic Swim Coach Eddie Reese said he believed the second spot was in capable hands. Hunt noted that he had swum against Piersol many times in prior meets.

Around five months after placing third in the 200 backstroke event at the NCAA Championships, Hunt competed in the men's 200-meter backstroke at the 2004 Olympics in August and advanced to the event semifinals, where he recorded a time of 1:59.74—the tenth-best time of the 2004 Olympics and around five seconds behind the gold medal finisher, Aaron Peirsol who won placed first in the final with a time of 1:54.95. Peirsol was initially disqualified after his first-place finish in the finals for briefly flipping on his back before making his final turn, but after an investigation it was found the official who judged the turn had not made a written description of the infringement in his paperwork. The disqualification was dismissed and Peirsol retained the gold medal.

After graduating Auburn around 2004, Hunt studied medicine at the University of Alabama Medical School, where he met his wife Katie. Bryce served as a resident physician at the University of Alabama Tuscaloosa Family Medicine Residency Program located in Tuscaloosa, Alabama, and then spent a career as a physician through at least 2024 with the University of Alabama, Birmingham Family Medicine. Of his four children, at least two swam with the Levite JCC in Birmingham.

== See also ==
- Swimming at the 2001 Summer Universiade
