= Caesar Garcia =

American diver

Personal information
- Born: November 13, 1981 (age 44) Baton Rouge, Louisiana, U.S.

Sport
- Country: United States
- Sport: Diving

Caesar Garcia (born November 13, 1981) is an American diver. He competed at the 2004 Summer Olympics in Athens, in the men's 10 metre platform.
