= Lyndon Ferns =

South African swimmer (born 1983)

Personal information
- Nationality: South Africa
- Born: 24 September 1983 (age 42) Pietersburg (now Polokwane), S.A.
- Height: 6 ft 2 in (188 cm)
- Weight: 198 lb (90 kg)

Sport
- Sport: Swimming
- Strokes: Sprint Freestyle / Butterfly
- Club: Ford Dealers Aquatics
- College team: Arizona Wildcats (USA)
- Coach: Rick DeMont (U. Arizona, Olympics)
Medal record
Men's swimming
Representing South Africa
Olympic Games
Gold medal – first place	2004 Athens	4×100 m freestyle
Commonwealth Games
Gold medal – first place	2006 Melbourne	4×100 m freestyle
Pan Pacific Championships
Bronze medal – third place	2010 Irvine	4×100 m freestyle

Lyndon Ferns (born 24 September 1983 in Pietersburg, South Africa) is a retired Olympic gold-medalist and former world record swimmer from South Africa who attended the University of Arizona. He swam for South Africa at the 2004 and 2008 Olympics.

== University of Arizona ==
He attended the University of Arizona from 2002-2006, where he competed and was trained and mentored by Hall of Fame Head Coach Frank Busch and former Olympian and sprint coach, Rick DeMont, who also coached Ferns's South African team at the 2004 and 2008 Olympics. Overall, Ferns was a four time NCAA champion during his time at Arizona. Lyndon completed his eligibility as a 24-time All-American, a PAC-10 champion, an NCAA record holder, 3-time relay national champion as well as national champion in the 100y butterfly. He had six top-five finishes at NCAA tournaments. While at UA, he completed a Bachelors of Science degree in Accounting.

Swimming for Arizona, Ferns set a school record of 45.89 seconds as an NCAA champion in the 100-meter butterfly. He was a member of the 400 freestyle, 400 medley and 800 freestyle NCAA Championship relay teams that helped lead Arizonas to a second-place finish at the NCAA Championships. While at Arizona, he earned eight individual First Team All- America honors and All- American honors in 15 relays.

== 2004 Athens, 2008 Beijing Olympics ==
At the 2004 Olympics, he was a member of South Africa's Men's 4×100 m freestyle relay that won the event in a world record. Ferns's 100-meter swim leg helped South Africa upset the United States and Russia in the 400 meter freestyle relay at the 2004 games, an historic upset over two teams that had dominated the event. As their fastest swimmer, Ferns's University of Arizona team mate Roland Schoeman's opening leg in the 4x100 relay, opened up a lead that remained throughout the race defeating the teams from both the Netherlands and the United States by over a second.

Lyndon also competed at the 2008 Beijing Olympic Games, where he set the African record in the 100m freestyle at 48.00, earning a sixth place in the finals. He also competed in the 100m butterfly, 4 × 100 m freestyle relay and 4 × 100 m medley relay at the Beijing Olympics.

Three of the 2004 South African Olympic 4x100 gold medal freestyle relay team were a part of the relay that broke the record and won gold at the 4x100 meter freestyle at the 2006 Commonwealth Games.

=== 2007, 2009 World Championships ===
During the 2007 World Championships held in Melbourne, Australia, Lyndon became the first man out of Africa to complete the 100m butterfly in under 52 seconds, touching the wall in 51.90 seconds and thereby breaking his own African record. He was also part of the 4 × 100 m freestyle and 4 × 100 m medley relay, both placing fourth.

In May 2009, it was announced that he was selected to participate with South Africa's team in the 2009 World Championships. At the World Championships, Lyndon became the first male athlete from Africa to complete the 100m freestyle in under 48 seconds, setting a new African record of 47.79 seconds. He is still the only man from Africa to have completed the 100m freestyle in a sub 48 second time.

Lyndon later won a bronze medal in the 2010 Pan Pacific Swimming Championships in Irvine in the 4x100 meter freestyle relay in what would become a signature event for the sprinter.

He is the holder of the following records: (Updated July 2014)

- African records: 100 m freestyle, 4×100 m freestyle relay
- South African records: 100 m freestyle, 4×100 m Freestyle relay

In April 2011, he retired from competitive swimming, and continued to reside in South Africa.

=== Honors ===
In August, 2024, he was inducted into the South African Sports Hall of Fame, along with the three other swimmers who won the gold medal in the 4x100 meter freestyle relay at the 2004 Athens Olympics.

== Personal bests ==
Event	Time	Date
50 lcm Freestyle	22.22	April 2008
100 lcm Freestyle	47.79	July 2009
100 lcm Butterfly	51.69	June 2009

Event	Time	Date
50 scm Freestyle	21.28	July 2006
50 scm Butterfly	22.83	July 2006
100 scm Freestyle	46.00	October 2009
100 scm Butterfly	50.17	November 2009

Event	Time	Date
50 y Freestyle	19.22	December 2003
100 y Freestyle	42.34	March 2005
100 y Butterfly	45.89	March 2006

== Affiliations ==
- TuksSport – University of Pretoria, South Africa
- Northern Tigers
- University of Arizona, USA

== See also ==
- List of Commonwealth Games medallists in swimming (men)
- List of Olympic medalists in swimming (men)
- World record progression 4 × 100 metres freestyle relay
