= Bryan Lundquist =

American swimmer (born 1985)

Personal information
- Full name: Bryan Jackson Lundquist
- National team: United States
- Born: May 30, 1985 (age 41) Marietta, Georgia, U.S.
- Height: 6 ft 4 in (1.93 m)
- Weight: 195 lb (88 kg)

Sport
- Sport: Swimming
- Strokes: Freestyle, butterfly
- College team: Auburn University
- Coach: David Marsh (Auburn)
Medal record
Men's swimming
Representing the United States
World Championships (SC)
Gold medal – first place	2008 Manchester	4x100 m freestyle
Summer Universiade
Gold medal – first place	2007 Bangkok	4x100 m freestyle

Bryan Lundquist (born May 30, 1985) is an American competition swimmer from Marietta, Georgia, who competed for Auburn University where he was part of four NCAA National Championship teams. Lundquist was a 2008 FINA Short Course World Championships gold medal winner where he set a world record in the 4x100 m freestyle relay, and in 2009 set a national record in the 50-meter freestyle of 22.91 that held for 13 years.

Bryan was born May 30, 1985 in Marietta, Georgia to Gordon and Debbie Lundquist. He attended Lassiter High School in Marietta, graduating in June, 2003, and was a member of the Stingrays Swimming club team. In his Senior year at Lassiter, he won a Georgia State title in the three events at the state championships that included the 100 butterfly, 50 freestyle, and 200 medley relay. In his Senior year, he was also honored as an All-County swimmer.

== Auburn University ==
He swam collegiately for Auburn University, from around 2003-2007, where he was a member of four consecutive National Championship teams under the direction of Hall of Fame Coach David Marsh.

== International competition ==
He was a member of the U.S. men's 4x100 meter relay that established a new world record with a time of 03:08.44 in short course meters at the 2008 FINA Short Course World Championships in Manchester, England. At Bangkok, Thailand's 2007 Summer Universiade, Lundquist was part of U.S. relay team that won a gold medal in the 4x100 meter freestyle relay.

He placed 7th at the 2008 US Olympic Swimming Trials in Omaha, Nebraska in the 50m Freestyle.

On July 18, 2009, while swimming at the U.S. Swimming Sectionals in Knoxville, Tennessee, Bryan established a new American Record in the 50 meter butterfly with a time of 22.91, becoming the first American to swim under 23 seconds in the event. The record held for 13 years when it was broken by Caleb Dressel who swam a 22.84 for the event in April, 2022.

== Honors ==
In his Senior year at Lassiter High School, Lundquist was a Journal-Constitution's Cobb County Swimmer of the Year, largely for winning 3 Georgia State Swimming titles.

Lundquist was active in United States Masters swimming, where in his mid to late 20's, he competed in backstroke, freestyle, butterfly and individual medley events, and received both All American and All Star Honors with Masters Swimming. He has resided in Colorado.

== See also ==
- List of Auburn University people
- World record progression 4 × 100 metres freestyle relay
