= Ben Wildman-Tobriner =

American swimmer

Personal information
- Full name: Benjamin Marshall Wildman-Tobriner
- Nicknames: "Ben," "Wild Man," "Vildman"
- National team: United States
- Born: September 21, 1984 (age 41) San Francisco, California, U.S.
- Height: 6 ft 4 in (1.93 m)
- Weight: 201 lb (91 kg)

Sport
- Sport: Swimming
- Strokes: Freestyle
- College team: Stanford University
Medal record
Men's swimming
Representing United States
Olympic Games
Gold medal – first place	2008 Beijing	4×100 m freestyle
World Championships (LC)
Gold medal – first place	2005 Montréal	4×100 m freestyle
Gold medal – first place	2007 Melbourne	50 m freestyle
Gold medal – first place	2007 Melbourne	4×100 m freestyle

Benjamin Marshall Wildman-Tobriner (born September 21, 1984) is an American physician and former competition swimmer, Olympic gold medalist, and former world record-holder.

== Early life ==
Wildman-Tobriner was born in San Francisco to Michael Tobriner and Stephanie Wildman, and is Jewish. He grew up in San Francisco with his parents and older sister, Rebecca. He attended Lick-Wilmerding High School of San Francisco. Wildman-Tobriner's paternal grandfather, Mathew Tobriner, served as a California Supreme Court Justice for 20 years.

== Swimming career ==
Wildman-Tobriner began his career swimming for a local recreational team called Swimarin in the Marin Swim League until the age of 12. Even at that age, he managed to set several team, pool, and league records and become recognized for his talents. Around the age of 12, he joined the Fog City Hammerheads Swim Team under the instruction of the notable coach, Matthew "Berto" Roberto.

He attended Lick-Wilmerding High School, where he was a four-year varsity swimmer, and three-time MVP. While in high school he received numerous All-American awards for swimming excellence, and set the California North Coast Sectional record in the 50-yard (46 m) freestyle and achieving the second-fastest time for a 17- to 18-year-old male in the 50-meter freestyle in the United States. After graduating Lick-Wilmerding, Wildman-Tobriner attended Stanford University where, as well as swimming all four years, he graduated in 2007 as a Biomechanical Engineer.

Wildman-Tobriner is most famous for his achievements in the 50-meter freestyle. In the spring of 2007, he competed in the World Championships where he won the 50-meter freestyle in a time of 21.88 seconds. He had the former American record in the 50-yard freestyle with a time of 18.87 seconds. He currently has 1 NCAA gold medal for the 400 Medley Relay (2005) as well as more than a dozen All-Americans and Pac-10 championships.

In December 2007, Wildman-Tobriner injured his left pectoral tendon, completely separating it from the humerus bone. After surgery, he resumed training, at first swimming using only his right arm, with his left arm in a sling. By May 2008, he had recovered enough to compete again, finishing fourth in a race in Santa Clara.

On July 3, 2008, Wildman-Tobriner qualified for the Olympic relay team as the second alternate in the 4 × 100 m freestyle relay. In Beijing, during the evening preliminary heats on August 10, he became a member of the World Record 4 × 100 m freestyle relay (3:12.23) by swimming the third leg in a time of 48.03. The next day, Wildman-Tobriner earned a gold medal (but lost the world record) when Jason Lezak swam down Alain Bernard in the final leg of the relay's final in world record time.

== Post-swimming career ==
After the Olympics, he went on to medical school at the University of California, San Francisco. Since 2018, he has been an assistant professor of radiology at the Duke University School of Medicine.

== See also ==
- List of Olympic medalists in swimming (men)
- List of select Jewish swimmers
- List of Stanford University people
- List of World Aquatics Championships medalists in swimming (men)
- World record progression 4 × 100 metres freestyle relay
