= Joona Puhakka =

Finnish diver

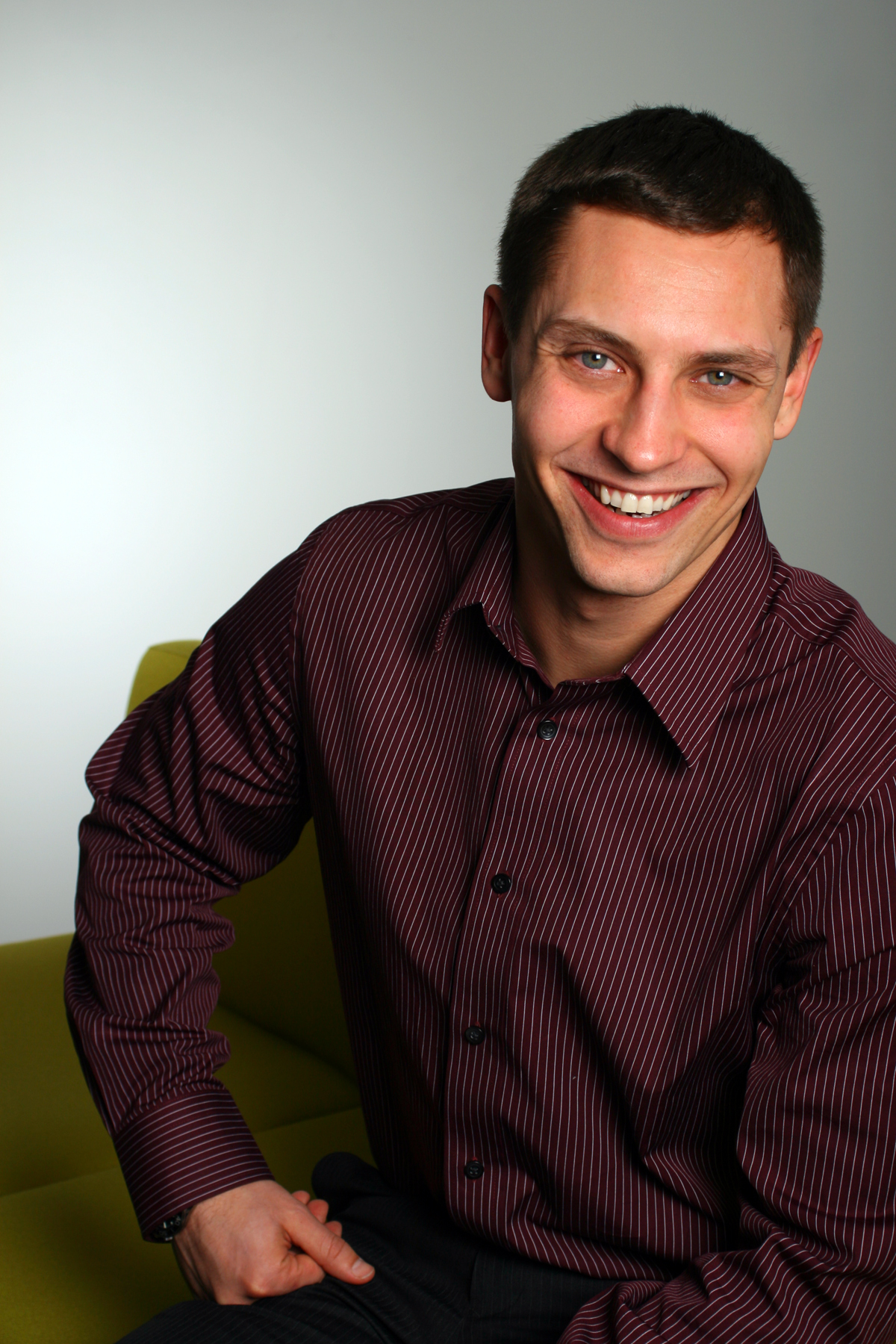

Personal information
- Born: 23 June 1982 (age 44) Kerava, Finland

Sport
- Sport: Diving
- Club: Arizona State Sun Devils
Medal record
Representing Finland
World Championships
Bronze medal – third place	2003 Barcelona	1 m springboard
European Championships
Gold medal – first place	2004 Madrid	1 m springboard
Gold medal – first place	2006 Budapest	1 m springboard
Silver medal – second place	2004 Madrid	3 m springboard
Silver medal – second place	2008 Eindhoven	1 m springboard
Bronze medal – third place	2000 Helsinki	1 m springboard
Bronze medal – third place	2006 Budapest	3 m springboard
Bronze medal – third place	2008 Eindhoven	3 m springboard

Joona Tapio Puhakka (born 23 June 1982) is a diver from Finland, who competed in three consecutive Summer Olympics for his native country: Sydney 2000, Athens 2004, and Beijing in 2008. He won the bronze medal in the men's 1-meter springboard at the 2003 World Championships in Barcelona, Spain.

While competing for Arizona State University in Tempe, Arizona, he won four NCAA (National Collegiate Athletic Association) championships - two on the 1-meter springboard, and two on the 3-meter springboard. Joona attended Arizona State from August 2002 until his graduation in May 2006.

Puhakka changed over from swimming to diving.
