= Simon Burnett =

British swimmer (born 1983)

Personal information
- Full name: Simon Andrew Burnett
- National team: Great Britain
- Born: 14 April 1983 (age 43) Oxford, England
- Height: 1.89 m (6 ft 2 in)
- Weight: 83 kg (183 lb)

Sport
- Sport: Swimming
- Strokes: Freestyle
- Club: Wycombe District
- College team: University of Arizona (U.S.)
Medal record
Men's swimming
Representing Great Britain
European Championships (LC)
Silver medal – second place	2006 Budapest	4×200 m freestyle
Bronze medal – third place	2006 Budapest	4×100 m medley
Representing England
Commonwealth Games
Gold medal – first place	2006 Melbourne	100 m freestyle
Gold medal – first place	2006 Melbourne	4×200 m freestyle
Silver medal – second place	2006 Melbourne	200 m freestyle
Silver medal – second place	2010 Delhi	100 m freestyle
Silver medal – second place	2010 Delhi	4×100 m freestyle
Bronze medal – third place	2002 Manchester	4×200 m freestyle
Bronze medal – third place	2010 Delhi	4×100 m medley

Simon Andrew Burnett (born 14 April 1983) is an English former competition swimmer who represented Great Britain in the Olympics and European championships, and England in the Commonwealth Games.

He formerly held the British Records in the 100 and 200-metre freestyles. Burnett attended and competed for the University of Arizona in the United States from 2001-2006, utilizing a redshirt leading up to the 2004 Summer Olympics for his 2003 collegiate season. In 2007 signed a sponsorship deal with Nike.

== Swimming career ==
Simon was born at the John Radcliffe Hospital in Oxford, the second of the three sons of Ray Burnett and Melanie Verhoeven. He lived in the Oxfordshire village of Chinnor as a child, and then moved a few miles to Tetsworth, attending Lord Williams's School in Thame, Oxfordshire. After completing his GCSEs, he went to John Hampden Grammar School, in High Wycombe, to study chemistry, biology, and physics at A-level. He first swam at Wycombe District Swimming Pool from a very young age, and soon joined the Wycombe District Swimming Club, where he remained until 2003. He was coached by Bob Pay and his move to John Hampden, which was local to the Wycombe Sports Centre at which he trained, helped him focus further on swimming. In 2003, with the help of Pay, Burnett won a sports scholarship at the University of Arizona to study business.

Burnett began competing at an international level in 2000 at the 3 Nations Junior International. At the ASA National Championships, he won gold in the 50-meter backstroke in 2001 and 2002. On the advice of Pay, Burnett switched to swim freestyle in 2003 and began to excel. His television debut was in 2002 at the Manchester Commonwealth Games, where he competed in the 4×200-metre freestyle relay and won a bronze medal. The following Olympic Games saw Burnett finish 7th in the 200-metre freestyle, and he competed in the 4×200-metre freestyle relay team, which finished 4th, nearly grabbing bronze medals. The British trials for the Games had been a great success for Simon, in which he won a silver medal in 100-metre freestyle and a gold medal in the 200-metre freestyle, despite having broken his wrist in a cycling accident in Arizona two months previously. He was now emerging as an elite British swimmer. Swimming for the University of Arizona, Burnett competed in the American NCAAs and won gold in his first year in the 200-yard freestyle and in 2005. 2005 was probably his best year yet, returning to England as well for the ASA National Championships. He won three gold medals in the 50-metre, 100-metre, and 200-metre freestyle, all of which were new British records. In the United States, he also broke the 17-year-old record for the 200-yard freestyle set by Matt Biondi at 1:33.03; Burnett swam a 1:32.22.

At the 2006 Commonwealth Games in Melbourne, Burnett competed in the 200-metre freestyle and won silver with a time of 1:47.38, beaten by team mate Ross Davenport, who swam a personal best of 1:47.29. He was also part of the relay team in the 4×100-metre freestyle, finishing fourth, with the South African favourites taking gold. However, the most sensational race was the 4×200-metre freestyle, when the English team won the gold medal, nudging Scotland into second place and Australia into third. The next day, he won individual gold in the 100-metre freestyle, leaving the South African entrants Ryk Neethling and Roland Schoeman into second and third respectively. With a time of 48.57 seconds, he set a Commonwealth Games record and broke his own British record by eleven one-hundredths of a second.

Before the Commonwealth Games had ended, Burnett was off to Atlanta for the 2006 National Collegiate Athletic Association (NCAA) championships. Burnett finished third in the 50-yard freestyle, second in the 4×50-yard freestyle relay, and first in the 4×50-yard medley for the Wildcats. He won the NCAA title in the 200-yard freestyle and broke the U.S. Open Record with a time of 1:31.20. Burnett's NCAA and U.S. Open record stood for 10 years until Townley Haas of the University of Texas broke it with a time of 1:30.46 at the 2016 NCAA Championships in the Georgia Tech Aquatic Center, the same venue in which Burnett broke the record a decade prior.

Burnett represented Great Britain at the 2008 Summer Olympics in the 4×100-metre freestyle relay swimming event.

In March 2009 he became the patron of the newly formed Thame Swimming Club, located at Lord Williams's Upper School, in Thame. He comes and meets the swimmers and helps with training whenever he is in the UK. In 2010, Burnett became patron of the Oxfordshire charity, UCARE (Urology Cancer Research and Education). Simon has been a committed advocate for UCARE, thinking strategically about supporting the charity's twin aims – to raise funds for research and to raise awareness of urological cancers – dedicating his medal to UCARE at the Commonwealth Games and attending events whenever he can.

== Coaching career ==
In June 2015, Burnett joined the Pacific Tigers men's swimming and diving team as an assistant coach.

== Personal Bests ==
Long course (50 m)

Event	Time	Date	Meet	Location	Ref
50 m freestyle	22.12	21 July 2005	Commonwealth Trials	Sheffield, Great Britain	
100 m freestyle	48.20	18 Aug 2008	Olympic Games	Beijing, China	

Short course (25 m)

Event	Time	Date	Meet	Location	Ref
100 m freestyle	48.83	14 Aug 2003	British Swimming SC Champs	Stockport, Great Britain	
200 m freestyle	1:45.24	14 Dec 2003	European SC Championships	Dublin, Ireland	

Legend: WR – World record; ER – European record; CR – Commonwealth record; NR – British record;
Records not set in finals: h – heat; sf – semifinal; r – relay 1st leg; rh – relay heat 1st leg; b – B final; † – en route to final mark; so – swim-off; tt – time trial

== See also ==
- List of British records in swimming
- List of Commonwealth Games medallists in swimming (men)
