= 1999 NCAA Division I Men's Swimming and Diving Championships =

American college aquatic sports competition

1999 NCAA Division I Swimming and Diving Championships
- Host city: Indianapolis, Indiana
- Date: March 1999
- Venue(s): Indiana University Natatorium; Indiana University

The 1999 NCAA Division I Men's Swimming and Diving Championships were contested in March 1999 at the Indiana University Natatorium in Indianapolis, Indiana at the 76th annual NCAA-sanctioned swim meet to determine the team and individual national champions of Division I men's collegiate swimming and diving in the United States. The men's and women's titles would not be held at the same site until 2006.

Auburn topped the team standings, finishing 53 points ahead of defending champions Stanford. It was the Tigers' second overall title, second title in three years, and the second for coach David Marsh.

== Team standings ==
- Note: Top 10 only
- (H) = Hosts
- ^{(DC)} = Defending champions
- Full results

Rank	Team	Points
1st place, gold medalist(s)	Auburn	467 1/2
2nd place, silver medalist(s)	Stanford ^{(DC)}	414 1/2
3rd place, bronze medalist(s)	Texas	356 1/2
4	California	300 1/2
5	Arizona	296
6	USC	286 1/2
7	Tennessee	171
8	Michigan	169
9	Georgia	149 1/2
10	Texas A&M	148

== Swimming results ==
Event	Gold		Silver		Bronze	
50 freestyle	Aaron Ciarla; Auburn	19.36	Brendon Dedekind; Florida State	19.48	Roland Schoeman; Arizona	19.49
100 freestyle	Bartosz Kizierowski; California	42.70	Roland Schoeman; Arizona	42.88	Brock Newman; Auburn	42.92
200 freestyle	Ryk Neethling; Arizona	1:33.59	Béla Szabados; USC	1:33.87	Anthony Rogis; Nebraska	1:35.08
500 freestyle	Ryk Neethling; Arizona	4:13.80	Béla Szabados; USC	4:15.69	Chris Thompson; Michigan	4:16.97
1650 freestyle	Ryk Neethling; Arizona	14:35.57	Chris Thompson; Michigan	14:38.96	Tim Siciliano; Michigan	14:37.80
100 backstroke	Michael Gilliam; Tennessee	47.12	Dan Schultz; Stanford	47.20	Justin Ewers; Stanford	47.26
200 backstroke	Tate Blahnik; Stanford	1:41.42	Matthew Cole; Florida	1:42.21	Marc Lindsay; Georgia	1:42.62
100 breaststroke	Brendon Dedekind; Florida State	53.16	Ed Moses; Virginia	53.50	David Denniston; Auburn	53.68
200 breaststroke	David Denniston; Auburn	1:55.51	Ed Moses; Virginia	1:57.06	Scott Werner; Michigan	1:57.52
100 butterfly	Dod Wales; Stanford	45.89; AR	Adam Pine; Nebraska	46.37	Nate Dusing; Texas	46.71
200 butterfly	Shamek Pietucha; Virginia	1:43.50	Tom Malchow; Michigan	1:43.58	Steve Parry; Florida State	1:44.36
200 IM	Lionel Moreau; Auburn	1:45.24	Nate Dusing; Texas	1:46.65	Joe Montague; Texas	1:46.67
400 IM	Tim Siciliano; Michigan	3:43.54	Beau Weibel; Georgia	3:46.02	Nuk Sirisanont; California	3:46.30
200 freestyle relay	Auburn; Aaron Ciarla (19.38); Brett Hawke (18.88); Brock Newman (19.15); Matthew Busbee (19.22)	1:16.63	Stanford; Anthony Robinson (19.69); Dod Wales (19.31); Glenn Counts (19.59); Justin Ewers (18.95)	1:17.54	California; Dan Lindstrom (20.03); Bartosz Kizierowski (19.19); Matt Macedo (19.52); Will Moore (19.55)	1:18.29
400 freestyle relay	Auburn; Brock Newman (42.99); Brett Hawke (42.21); Aaron Ciarla (43.06); Romain Barnier (42.64)	2:50.90; US	Stanford; Justin Ewers (43.40); Glenn Counts (43.33); Anthony Robinson (43.73); Dod Wales (42.95)	2:53.41	Arizona; Roland Schoeman (43.06); Coley Stickels (43.00); Jay Schryver (43.49); Scott Gaskins (44.32)	2:53.87
800 freestyle relay	Texas; Bryan Jones (1:36.49); Scott Goldblatt (1:36.34); Nate Dusing (1:34.88); Jamie Rauch (1:35.32)	6:23.03	USC; Philippe Demers (1:37.60); Bret Awbrey (1:36.82); Mark Kwok (1:37.91); Béla Szabados (1:34.12)	6:26.45	Auburn; John Pearce (1:37.81); Romain Barnier (1:35.01); Nate Boyle (1:37.19); Lionel Moreau (1:36.51)	6:26.52
200 medley relay	Auburn; Michael Bartz (21.91); David Denniston (24.40); Brett Hawke (20.68); Aaron Ciarla (19.13)	1:26.12	Stanford; Dan Schultz (22.81); Anthony Robinson (23.93); Dod Wales (20.35); Justin Ewers (19.14)	1:26.23	Arizona; Matt Allen (22.21); Rob Henikman (24.26); Roland Schoeman (20.59); Coley Stickels (19.46)	1:26.52
400 medley relay	Auburn; Michael Bartz (47.80); David Denniston (52.85); Brock Newman (46.18); Brett Hawke (42.34)	3:09.17	Stanford; Dan Schultz (47.69); Anthony Robinson (53.66); Dod Wales (45.38); Justin Ewers (42.52)	3:09.25	California; Gordan Kožulj (48.34); Andrew Chan (53.72); Dan Lindstrom (46.02); Bartosz Kizierowski (41.99)	3:10.07

Legend: US – U.S. Open record; AR – American record;

== Diving results ==
Event	Gold		Silver		Bronze	
1 m diving	Rio Ramirez; Miami	643.10	Troy Dumais; Texas	634.10	Justin Dumais; USC	595.95
3 m diving	Troy Dumais; Texas	688.70	Rio Ramirez; Miami	666.95	Imre Lengyel; Miami	634.90
Platform diving	Rio Ramirez; Miami	901.60	Troy Dumais; Texas	841.00	Justin Dumais; USC	837.95

== See also ==
- List of college swimming and diving teams
