= Swimming at the 1984 Summer Olympics – Women's 100 metre breaststroke =

Women's 100 metre breaststroke at the Games of the XXIII Olympiad
- Venue: McDonald's Olympic Swim Stadium
- Date: 2 August 1984 (heats & final)
- Competitors: 30 from 21 nations
- Winning time: 1:09.88 OR

Medalists
1st place, gold medalist(s)		Petra van Staveren	Netherlands
2nd place, silver medalist(s)		Anne Ottenbrite	Canada
3rd place, bronze medalist(s)		Catherine Poirot	France

The final of the women's 100 metre backstroke event at the 1984 Summer Olympics was held in the McDonald's Olympic Swim Stadium in Los Angeles, California, on August 2, 1984.

== Records ==
Prior to this competition, the existing world and Olympic records were as follows.

World record	Ute Geweniger (GDR)	1:08.51	Rome, Italy	25 August 1983
Olympic record	Ute Geweniger (GDR)	1:10.11	Moscow, Soviet Union	24 July 1980

The following records were established during the competition:

Date	Round	Name	Nation	Time	Record
2 August	Final A	Petra van Staveren	Netherlands	1:09.88	OR

== Results ==
=== Heats ===
Rule: The eight fastest swimmers advance to final A (Q), while the next eight to final B (q).

Rank	Heat	Lane	Name	Nationality	Time	Notes
1	2	5	Catherine Poirot	France	1:10.69	Q, NR
2	3	4	Petra van Staveren	Netherlands	1:11.18	Q
3	2	2	Jean Hill	Great Britain	1:11.37	Q
4	4	3	Eva-Marie Håkansson	Sweden	1:11.41	Q
5	4	5	Susan Rapp	United States	1:11.63	Q
6	2	4	Anne Ottenbrite	Canada	1:11.81	Q
7	4	4	Hiroko Nagasaki	Japan	1:11.82	Q
8	1	4	Tracy Caulkins	United States	1:11.99	Q
9	3	2	Ingrid Lempereur	Belgium	1:12.08	q
10	1	3	Ute Hasse	West Germany	1:12.17	q
10	2	6	Dimity Douglas	Australia	1:12.17	q
12	1	5	Lisa Borsholt	Canada	1:12.24	q
13	3	3	Angelika Knipping	West Germany	1:12.41	q
14	2	7	Patricia Brülhart	Switzerland	1:12.44	q
15	4	6	Annelie Holmström	Sweden	1:12.60	q
16	2	3	Carlotta Tagnin	Italy	1:12.70	q
17	1	6	Sandra Bowman	Great Britain	1:12.92	
18	3	7	Sharon Kellett	Australia	1:13.43	
19	1	2	Petra Hillenius	Netherlands	1:14.09	
20	4	2	Liang Weifen	China	1:14.38	
21	3	6	Alicia María Boscatto	Argentina	1:14.45	
22	4	7	Kaori Iwasaki	Japan	1:14.68	
23	4	1	Sara Guido	Mexico	1:14.69	
24	1	7	Maarit Vähäsaari-Sihvonen	Finland	1:14.85	
25	3	1	Guðrún Ágústsdóttir	Iceland	1:16.70	
26	2	1	Rosa María Silva	Uruguay	1:17.11	
27	1	1	Chow Lai Yee	Hong Kong	1:17.92	
28	4	8	Helen Chow	Malaysia	1:18.99	
29	3	8	Isabel Lardizábal	Honduras	1:25.12	
	3	5	Manuela Dalla Valle	Italy	DSQ	

=== Finals ===
==== Final B ====
Rank	Lane	Name	Nationality	Time	Notes
9	3	Ute Hasse	West Germany	1:11.44	NR
10	4	Ingrid Lempereur	Belgium	1:11.45	NR
11	5	Dimity Douglas	Australia	1:12.00	OC
12	2	Angelika Knipping	West Germany	1:12.03	
13	6	Lisa Borsholt	Canada	1:12.41	
14	8	Carlotta Tagnin	Italy	1:12.77	
15	7	Patricia Brülhart	Switzerland	1:12.89	
16	1	Annelie Holmström	Sweden	1:13.27	

==== Final A ====
Rank	Lane	Name	Nationality	Time	Notes
1st place, gold medalist(s)	5	Petra van Staveren	Netherlands	1:09.88	OR
2nd place, silver medalist(s)	7	Anne Ottenbrite	Canada	1:10.69	
3rd place, bronze medalist(s)	4	Catherine Poirot	France	1:10.70	
4	8	Tracy Caulkins	United States	1:10.88	
5	6	Eva-Marie Håkansson	Sweden	1:11.14	NR
6	1	Hiroko Nagasaki	Japan	1:11.33	
7	2	Susan Rapp	United States	1:11.45	
8	3	Jean Hill	Great Britain	1:11.82	
