= Auburn Tigers swimming and diving =

Swimming and diving program for Auburn University

- Founded: 1932; 94 years ago
- Head coach: Ryan Wochomurka
- Conference: Southeastern Conference
- Location: Auburn, Alabama, US
- Home pool: James E. Martin Aquatics Center
- Colors: Burnt orange and navy blue

Men's NCAA Champions
- 1997, 1999, 2003, 2004, 2005, 2006, 2007, 2009

Women's NCAA Champions
- 2002, 2003, 2004, 2006, 2007

Men's Conference Champions
- 1994, 1995, 1997, 1998, 1999, 2000, 2001, 2002, 2003, 2004, 2005, 2006, 2007, 2008, 2009, 2010, 2011, 2012

Women's Conference Champions
- 2003, 2004, 2005, 2007, 2008

The Auburn Tigers swimming and diving program is Auburn University's representative in the sport of swimming and diving. The Tigers compete in the National Collegiate Athletic Association (NCAA) Division 1 and are members of the Southeastern Conference (SEC). The program started in 1932 when the pool was in the basement of the gymnasium. The program had to telegraph their timed results to other schools and compare as the pool was too small for competitions.

The Tigers' first national champion was Scott Spann Sr, who won the 200m Individual Medley in 1978. The women's team became a full NCAA sport in 1982. David Marsh was hired in 1990 and he would make Auburn into a national powerhouse.

Under Marsh the program won a combined twelve NCAA championships. The men have won eight (1997, 1999, 2003, 2004, 2005, 2006, 2007, 2009) while the women have won five (2002, 2003, 2004, 2006, 2007). David Marsh stepped down at the end of the 2006–2007 season. He was replaced by former Auburn, Texas Longhorns and Stanford University head coach Richard Quick. The Tiger men won the 2009 national championship, the 8th for the men and 13th total for the program. In May 2009 assistant coach Brett Hawke was promoted to co-head coach to run the program together with Quick. On June 10, Coach Quick died after a six-month struggle with brain cancer. In March 2018, following the conclusion of the NCAA men's and women's championships, Hawke informed the team he would be resigning as the head coach after 10 seasons. On April 28, 2018 NC State Wolfpack assistant swimming coach Gary Taylor was named the eighth head coach of the program. Following the 2021 NCAA Championships in which the men's and women's teams failed to score any points, Auburn and Taylor mutually decided to part ways. Auburn athletics director Allen Greene announced a national search for Taylor's successor would begin immediately. On April 23, 2021, Auburn announced former Auburn swimmer Ryan Wochomurka was hired to be the new head coach of both the men's and women's teams.

Auburn has regularly been represented in the Olympic Games, with a university record eighteen swimmers at the 2008 Beijing Olympic Games where five Auburn Tigers won a record twelve medals. At the same Olympics, Kirsty Coventry, now president of the International Olympic Committee, won her seventh Olympic medal to replace Auburn alumnus and NBC swimming commentator Rowdy Gaines at the top of the Auburn roster of Olympic medallists. Also in the Beijing games César Cielo Filho became the first Auburn swimmer to win an Olympic gold medal in the 50m Free Style event.

== History ==
Auburn's swimming and diving program got off to a modest start in 1932. Swimming in the basement of the Alumni Gym (which no longer exists on campus) the Tigers swam in a small pool which only had room for three lanes. Swimmers were timed and results were telegraphed to other schools for comparisons. The first real competitions were held in 1936, with ten swimmers competing. The Tigers first swam in the SEC Championships in 1940 and placed 5th. With the outbreak of World War II, Auburn stopped all intercollegiate sports and swimming was not reinstated after the war due to inadequate facilities. The team was reinstated in 1947, and reentered the SEC Championships in 1948. Throughout the 1950s and 60's, the program garnered little attention as it was mostly coached by volunteers and swimmers consisted of the fastest members of the university's mandatory swim classes.

A new university swim team was formed in the fall of 1970, and two major changes helped transition the program into the modern era of collegiate swimming. A competition pool was constructed adjacent to Memorial Coliseum (renamed to Beard-Eaves Coliseum in 1993) through the support of university president Harry M. Philpott. In addition to a new pool, the university hired Bill Washington as the program's first official head coach. In 1973, Washington moved into a teaching role and the athletics department hired Eddie Reese to take over. The swim program experienced a rapid rise to national prominence under the leadership of Reese. Auburn finished 3rd in the SEC and 17th in the NCAA meet in 1974, the highest finish in school history at that time. The Tigers climbed up to second in the NCAA's by 1978, in which Auburn captured the first individual NCAA champion in school history when Scott Spann Sr. won the 200 IM and the 100 breaststroke. Following the 1978 season, Reese left the Auburn program to take over as the coach at the University of Texas. After his departure, Auburn hired Iowa State men's swimming coach Richard Quick to be Reese's successor. Auburn experienced continued success under Quick as the men finished in sixth at the 1979 NCAA championships and fifth in 1980 and 1981. In 1982, women's swimming became an official SEC sport, and the Auburn women's program finished fourth at the AIAW Championships. After the conclusion of the 1982 season, Quick left Auburn to become the coach of the women's program at the University of Texas, serving beside Eddie Reese. Auburn replaced Quick with John Asmuth, who was a swimmer during Reese's tenure at Auburn. Asmuth was known for helping coach two of Auburn's early Olympic swimmers, Rowdy Gaines and Per Johansson, but perhaps his best contribution to Auburn's swim program was James Martin Aquatics Center. Asmuth served as a key member in planning and gaining the support for the construction of the world-class natatorium. Asmuth served as the head coach for eight years where his teams finished in the top ten in three years and top twenty another three years.

In 1990, Auburn hired David Marsh who would take the Tigers to new heights. He led the 1994 men to an SEC title, the first in school history. That same year, the Tiger women won the 200-yard (180 m) medley relay, becoming the first team outside of Stanford, Texas, or Florida to win an NCAA title in a relay at the NCAA meet. The men would go on to win the 1997 national championship, the first team in Auburn history to win an NCAA title. The women swimmers became the first Auburn women's team to win an NCAA title in 2002. The women would then win the SEC title in 2003 for the first time, with the men also winning an SEC Championship (their seventh consecutive) marking the first time the men's and women's SEC championships were held by the same school. Later that year, the Auburn teams combined to sweep the NCAA titles, another first for men's and women's teams coached by the same person. Auburn had established itself as a national swimming power. Auburn had another first for a swimming program in 2005. After winning the 2005 national title the Auburn men's team became the first men's swimming and diving team invited to be honored at the White House by then President George W. Bush. The women joined the men the next year.

David Marsh's career as Auburn head coach ended in March 2007 after leading the Tigers to the 2007 men's and women's national titles in his fourth sweep of the events. Marsh finished with 17 SEC Championships and a record-tying 12 national championships. The coach he tied is incoming Tigers coach Richard Quick who won 12 combined national titles as the Women's head coach for Texas and Stanford.

In 2008 the Auburn women finished second to Arizona Wildcats while the men finished in fifth place.

In 2009 the Tigers reclaimed the Men's national title by edging out second place Texas by 39 points. The 2009 title was the eighth for the men and the 13th overall for Auburn. It also marked Richard Quick's 13th title after winning twelve at Stanford and Texas. He moved ahead of former Auburn coach David Marsh for the most titles for a coach in his career and became the first coach to win national titles at three schools.

During the 2008–2009 season Brett Hawke, a former Auburn swimmer himself, took over the day-to-day running of the men's program after Richard Quick was diagnosed with a brain tumor. After the season Auburn Athletics Director Jay Jacobs announced that Hawke would be promoted to co-head coach and would work with both the Men's and Women's programs while consulting with Quick.

Under the leadership of Hawke, the men's team captured the 2010, 2011, and 2012 SEC championships, but failed to win another national title after 2009. In March 2018, following the NCAA men's and women's championships, Hawke informed the team he would be resigning from his position. The athletics department, under the new leadership of athletic director Allen Greene, immediately began searching for Hawke's successor. On April 28, 2018 NC State Wolfpack assistant swimming coach Gary Taylor was named the new head coach. Taylor immediately faced a challenging situation as two of the program's top swimmers, Zach Apple and Hugo Gonzalez, announced their intent to transfer following Taylor's arrival. On April 19, 2021, Auburn athletics director Allen Greene announced that Auburn and coach Gary Taylor had mutually agreed to part ways, and a national search for his successor would begin immediately. At the 2021 NCAA Championships, both the men's and women's programs failed to score any points.

On April 23, 2021, former Auburn swimmer Ryan Wochomurka was announced as the new head coach of the program. Wochomurka formerly served as the head coach of the Houston Cougars women's swimming and diving program. Wochomurka swam at Auburn from 2002 to 2005 where he was a 21-time All-American.

== Facilities ==
The Auburn Swimming and Diving program competes in the James E. Martin Aquatics Center. The center first opened in the 1993 and was designed to be one of the premier natatoriums in collegiate swimming and diving. The James E. Martin Aquatics Center has hosted multiple competitions including the SEC Championships three times, the NCAA Championships twice, as well the 1995, 2000, and 2005 U.S. Open competitions. In the months leading up to the Atlanta Olympic Games swimming teams from Israel, China, Japan, South Africa, and Finland used the facility to train while the US Olympic Water Polo also used the facility.

The facility cost $10.5 million and was a pet project of its namesake, former Auburn University President James E. Martin. Seating at the center has room for 1,000 spectators and an additional 800 poolside seats for competitors. The competition pool features a state of the art gutter system that absorbs waves instead of reverberating back into the pool, which creates a calmer swimming surface. The bulkheads also provide a flow-through design to prevent waves on turns. The pool is nine feet deep at the shallowest and 16.5 feet (5.0 m) below the diving apparatus. The entire pool is 77 yards (70 m) long (232 ft) and 25 yards (75 ft) wide. The bulkheads are movable and allow variable lengths for competition and practice as well as simultaneous diving. The facility also features the original Auburn competition pool, renovated as a warm-up and practice pool.

In the summer of 2007, Auburn University completed work on a new $1 million outdoor training pool, part of a large scale effort by the Auburn Athletics Department to improve the school's facilities.

== Men's swimming and diving ==
On top of their seven national titles, the Auburn men have won several SEC championships. Since their first SEC Championship in 1994, Auburn has won 14 out of the last 15 SEC titles, including 13 straight since 1996. Only Tennessee has broken Auburn's SEC championship streak. Between January 11, 2001, and January 11, 2007, Auburn did not lose a single dual meet (meets in between 2 or 3 teams only). The only team to beat Auburn during that time period was arch swimming rival Texas, when they snapped the Tigers 44 consecutive dual meet winning streak by a score of 130–113.

The 2006 Men's Swimming and Diving senior class, consisting of Kurt Cady, George Bovell, Eric Shanteau, and Doug Van Wie finished as the only senior class in AU History for any sport to go undefeated their entire college career. They never lost a Dual, SEC, or NCAA meet.

The 2007 Men's SEC Championship team dominated the conference competition, winning by 114.5 points over the second place Florida. The men's team won 11 individual conference titles, including sweeping all diving and relay events.

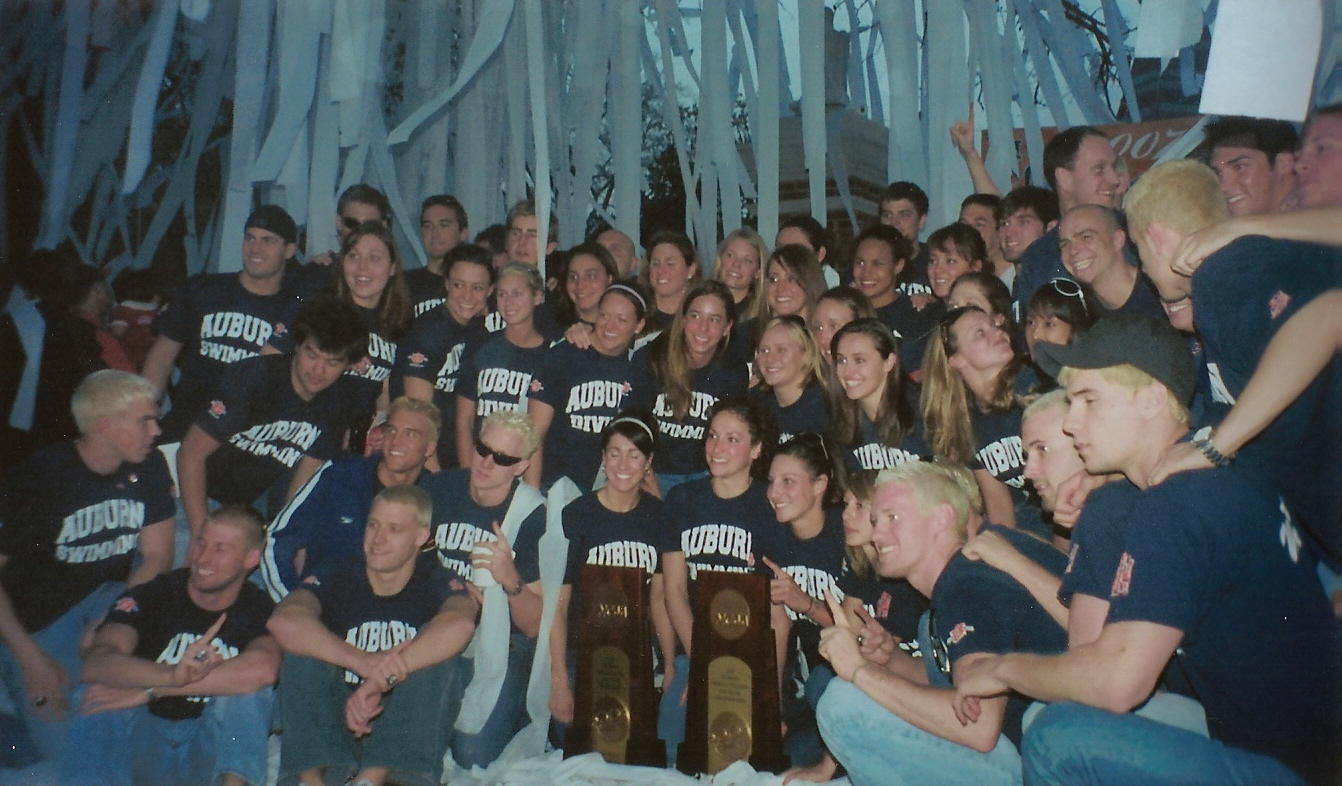
The 2007 Auburn teams celebrate their national titles at Toomers Corner in Auburn

Like the conference, Auburn's men dominated the 2007 NCAA championship meet. The Tigers scored 566 points in the meet, easily outdistancing second place Stanford who scored 397 points, a difference of 169. On the very first swim of the meet, the 200-yard (180 m) freestyle relay, the Tigers set a new NCAA record in the prelims which they then broke in the championship final (1:14.71). Auburn would go on to set NCAA records in four more events, the 50 Free (César Cielo, 18.69), 100 Free (César Cielo, 41.17), the 400 Free relay (2:46.56), and the 200 Medley Relay (1:23.37). César Cielo became the first Auburn swimmer since Rowdy Gaines to win the 100 Free national title, and the first Auburn swimmer to win the 100 and 50 free in the same NCAA meet. Auburn diver Steven Segerlin repeated his 2006 Platform diving championship and won the 3M Springboard title to go with his third place in the 1M Springboard. Auburn was awarded for its dominance by sweeping the post meet awards, David Marsh was named NCAA Division I Men's Swimming Coach of the Year, head diving coach Jeff Shafer was named NCAA Division I Men's Diving Coach of the Year, César Cielo was named NCAA Division I Men's Swimmer of the Year and Steven Segerlin was named NCAA Division I Men's Diver of the Year.

In the 2009 SEC Championship meet, Auburn's men won first place for the 13th consecutive time, tying a conference record. Auburn was led by Matt Targett, who won seven individual SEC championships, winning every event he entered. He was named SEC Male Swimmer of the year for his efforts. In the 2009 national championships held in College Station, Texas Auburn trailed rival Texas for the first two days of the competition. In the final day of competition Auburn took the lead during the first two events and held on to win the eighth national title for the men's team. The Auburn men's team continued their streak of SEC Championships by winning the conference meet in 2010, 2011, and 2012. The Florida Gators ended Auburn's streak of sixteen straight championships when they won the men's 2013 SEC Swimming & Diving Championship.

== Women's swimming and diving ==
Auburn's women's team have won five national titles (2002, 2003, 2004, 2006 and 2007). They have been SEC Champions four times (2003, 2004, 2005, 2007). In 2005, Auburn lost to Georgia by two points at the NCAA championships and in the SEC Championships in 2006. The second-place finisher at the SEC championships went on to win the national championship while the SEC champion won national runner-up in 2005 and 2006. The 2007 SEC Championships saw the close competition between the Dogs and Tigers come to an end, as Auburn beat Georgia by 228 points while Georgia finished 5th in the NCAA championships to Auburn's first-place finish. At the 2007 SEC Championships the women posted a school record for individual conference titles won at 12 and took home 19 All-American honors for the national championships.

In 2009 the Auburn women finished second to the Florida Gators in the SEC Championships.

== NCAA team championships ==
The Tigers have won a combined 13 NCAA championships. When looking at all time results with men's and women's championships combined, the Auburn Tigers rank third behind Texas (20 combined NCAA championships) and Stanford (17 combined NCAA championships). The Auburn women rank third all time with 5 NCAA championships behind Stanford (8) and Texas (7). The Auburn men rank tied for fifth all time with Stanford, each with 8 NCAA titles. The Tigers and Cardinal are behind Texas (13), Michigan (12), Ohio State (11), and USC (9). With their 2007 national title, Auburn's men joined Michigan and Indiana as the only teams to win five consecutive national titles.

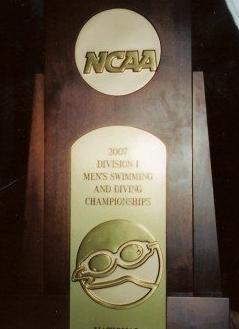
The 2007 men's national championship trophy

Auburn Tigers Team NCAA Championships
Year	Team	National Champion	Score	Runner-up	Score	Location
1997	Men	Auburn	496.5	Stanford	340	Minneapolis, Minnesota
1999	Men	Auburn	467.5	Stanford	414.5	Bloomington, Indiana
2002	Women	Auburn	474	Georgia	386	Austin, Texas
2003	Women	Auburn	536	Georgia	373	Auburn, Alabama
2003	Men	Auburn	609.5	Texas	413	Austin, Texas
2004	Women	Auburn	569	Georgia	431	College Station, Texas
2004	Men	Auburn	634	Stanford	377.5	Long Island, New York
2005	Men	Auburn	491	Stanford	414	Minneapolis, Minnesota
2006	Women	Auburn	518.5	Georgia	515.5	Athens, Georgia
2006	Men	Auburn	480.5	Arizona	440.5	Atlanta, Georgia
2007	Women	Auburn	535	Arizona	477	Minneapolis, Minnesota
2007	Men	Auburn	566	Stanford	397	Minneapolis, Minnesota
2009	Men	Auburn	526	Texas	487	College Station, Texas

== Southeastern Conference Championships ==
Auburn has won 23 SEC championships in program history. Auburn's women have won five SEC titles, their last coming in 2008. The Auburn men have won 18 conference titles, including 16 straight from 1997 to 2012.

Auburn Tiger Team Southeastern Conference Championships
Year	Team	SEC Champions	Score	Runner-up	Score	Location
1994	Men	Auburn	633.5	Florida	604.5	Auburn, AL
1995	Men	Auburn	754.5	Tennessee	676.5	Columbia, SC
1997	Men	Auburn	780.5	Tennessee	680	Athens, GA
1998	Men	Auburn	858.5	Georgia	690.5	Gainesville, FL
1999	Men	Auburn	857.5	Tennessee	700	Lexington, KY
2000	Men	Auburn	752	Florida	680.5	Auburn, AL
2001	Men	Auburn	814	Tennessee	632.5	Tuscaloosa, AL
2002	Men	Auburn	763	Florida	744	Fayetteville, AR
2003	Men	Auburn	918.5	Florida	680	Auburn, AL
2003	Women	Auburn	841.5	Florida	685	Auburn, AL
2004	Men	Auburn	1,008	Florida	705	Athens, GA
2004	Women	Auburn	846	Georgia	756	Athens, GA
2005	Men	Auburn	829.5	Florida	801.5	Gainesville, FL
2005	Women	Auburn	816	Georgia	809	Gainesville, FL
2006	Men	Auburn	1,101.5	Florida	939.5	Knoxville, TN
2007	Men	Auburn	934	Florida	819.5	Lexington, KY
2007	Women	Auburn	899	Georgia	671	Lexington, KY
2008	Men	Auburn	806	Florida	712	Tuscaloosa, AL
2008	Women	Auburn	761.5	Florida	706	Tuscaloosa, AL
2009	Men	Auburn	880.5	Florida	626	Auburn, AL
2010	Men	Auburn	784	Florida	765	Athens, GA
2011	Men	Auburn	799	Florida	782	Gainesville, FL
2012	Men	Auburn	730.5	Florida	700	Knoxville, TN

== Individual NCAA champions ==
=== Men ===
Athlete	Titles	Year(s)	Event(s)
Brett Hawke	9	1997, 1998, 1999	50 freestyle, 200 freestyle relay (2), 400 freestyle relay (2), 200 medley relay (3), 400 medley relay
Rowdy Gaines	8	1978, 1979, 1980, 1981	50 freestyle, 100 freestyle (2), 200 freestyle (2), 400 freestyle relay, 800 freestyle relay (2)
Aaron Ciarla	7	1997, 1999, 2000	50 freestyle, 200 freestyle relay (3), 400 freestyle relay, 200 medley relay (2)
Brock Newman	6	1996, 1997, 1999	200 freestyle relay, 400 freestyle relay (3), 400 medley relay (2)
Frédérick Bousquet	6	2003, 2004, 2005	50 freestyle (3), 200 freestyle relay, 400 freestyle relay, 200 medley relay
César Cielo	10	2006, 2007, 2008	50 freestyle (2), 100 freestyle (2), 200 freestyle relay (3), 400 freestyle relay, 200 medley relay (2)
Michael Bartz	5	1997, 1998, 1999	200 medley relay (2), 400 medley relay (3)
George Bovell	5	2003, 2004, 2006	200 IM (2), 200 freestyle relay (2), 400 freestyle relay
Scott Spann Sr.	3	1977, 1978	100 breaststroke, 200 IM (2)
Bill Forrester	3	1978, 1981	400 freestyle relay, 800 freestyle relay (2)
Dave McCagg	3	1978, 1981	400 freestyle relay, 800 freestyle relay (2)
Rick Morley	3	1978, 1981	400 freestyle relay, 800 freestyle relay (2)
Nick Shackell	3	1996, 1997	200 freestyle relay, 400 freestyle relay (2)
Matt Busbee	3	1997, 1999, 2000	200 freestyle relay (3)
Adam Jerger	3	1997, 1998	200 medley relay (2), 400 medley relay
Dave Denniston	3	1999	200 breaststroke, 200 medley relay, 400 medley relay
Derek Gibb	3	2004	200 freestyle relay, 400 freestyle relay, 200 medley relay
Bryan Lundquist	3	2006, 2007	200 freestyle relay (2), 400 freestyle relay
Steven Segerlin	3	2006, 2007	3 m Springboard, Platform (2)
Matt Targett	7	2006, 2007, 2009	200 freestyle relay (3), 200 medley relay 400 freestyle relay (2), 400 medley relay
Scott Tucker	2	1996, 1997	400 freestyle relay (2)
John Hargis	2	1997	200 medley relay, 400 medley relay
Caesar Garcia	2	2003, 2004	Platform (2)
Ryan Wochomurka	2	2004	200 freestyle relay, 400 freestyle relay
Jose Richa	1	1987	1 m Springboard
Kurt Jachimowski	1	1995	200 IM
Oliver Gumbrill	1	1996	400 freestyle relay
Romain Barnier	1	1999	400 freestyle relay
Lionel Moreau	1	1999	200 IM
Greg Busse	1	2000	200 freestyle relay
Oswaldo Quevedo	1	2000	200 freestyle relay
Mark Gangloff	1	2004	200 medley relay
Doug Van Wie	1	2004	200 medley relay
Matt Bricker	1	2005	Platform
Jakob Andkjaer	3	2007, 2009	200 freestyle relay, 400 freestyle relay (2)
Kolhton Norys	2	2009	100 back, 400 freestyle relay
Tyler McGill	2	2009	400 freestyle relay, 400 medley relay
Jared White	1	2009	200 medley relay
Michael Silva	2	2009	200 medley relay, 200 free relay
Gideon Louw	2	2009	200 medley relay, 200 freestyle relay
Pascal Wollach	1	2009	400 medley relay
Adam Klein	1	2009	400 medley relay
Marcelo Chierighini	2	2013, 2014	200 freestyle relay, 400 freestyle relay
James Disney-May	2	2013, 2014	200 freestyle relay, 400 freestyle relay
TJ Leon	1	2013	200 freestyle relay
Kyle Owens	1	2013	200 freestyle relay
Arthur Mendes	1	2014	400 freestyle relay
Kyle Darmody	1	2014	400 freestyle relay

=== Women ===
Athlete	Titles	Year(s)	Event(s)
Maggie Bowen	9	2001, 2002, 2003	200 IM (3), 400 IM (3), 400 freestyle relay, 800 freestyle relay, 400 medley relay
Kirsty Coventry	7	2003, 2004, 2005	200 backstroke (2), 200 IM, 400 IM, 400 freestyle relay, 800 freestyle relay, 400 medley relay
Margaret Hoelzer	7	2003, 2004, 2005	200 Free (2), 400 freestyle relay, 800 freestyle relay, 200 medley relay (2), 400 medley relay
Becky Short	3	2003	400 freestyle relay, 200 medley relay, 400 medley relay
Mimi Bowen	2	1997	100 butterfly, 200 medley relay
Jenni Anderson	2	2003, 2004	200 medley relay
Eileen Coparropa	2	2003, 2004	400 freestyle relay, 200 medley relay
Heather Kemp	2	2003	200 freestyle, 800 freestyle relay
Laura Swander	2	2003, 2004	200 medley relay (2)
Rachel Goh	2	2006, 2007	100 backstroke (2)
Hayley Peirsol	2	2006, 2007	1650 freestyle (2)
Marina Smith	1	1993	1 m Springboard
Allison Bock	1	1994	200 medley relay
Stephanie Bowers	1	1994	200 medley relay
Kristie Kruger	1	1994	200 medley relay
Keri Reynolds	1	1994	200 medley relay
Annemieke McReynolds	1	1997	200 medley relay
Katie Taylor	1	1997	200 medley relay
Anne Wenglarski	1	1997	200 medley relay
Adrienne Binder	1	2007	500 freestyle
Ava Ohlgren	2	2007, 2008	400 IM, 200 IM
Arianna Vanderpool-Wallace	3	2011, 2012	50 freestyle, 100 freestyle (2)
Olivia Scott	1	2013	100 butterfly

== Auburn swimmers in international events ==
Auburn has sent many swimmers to the Olympic games and other international competitions Auburn Swimmers compete for their home countries in events such as the Goodwill Games, Pan-Pacific Games, World University Games and the FINA World Championships, which is similar to the World Cup in soccer, where Auburn Swimmers have won as of 2006 18 gold medals.

=== 2007 Pan-American Games ===
At the 2007 Pan-American Games Auburn swimmers won a school record 13 medals including eight golds. The top Auburn swimmers in the event were César Cielo with two golds and a Pan-Am Record of 21.84 in the 50 freestyle. Cielo won two more medals on relay teams. Emily Kukors of Auburn won two golds, becoming the first Auburn female swimmer to win multiple golds in the Pan-American games, in the 800 free relay and the 400 free relay for the USA team. She also captured silver in the 200 IM.

=== Auburn Olympians ===
In the most well known international swimming competition, the Olympics, 30 Auburn swimmers and divers have competed for 14 countries with 8 swimmers taking home medals. Auburn coaches David Marsh and Jeff Shaffer as well as incoming coach Richard Quick have all coached US teams in the Olympics as well. The two most decorated Auburn Olympians are Rowdy Gaines and Kirsty Coventry. Gaines competed in the 1984 Los Angeles games, where he won three gold medals in the 100 Freestyle and in the 400 Free relay and the 400 Medley Relay for the United States of America. Coventry became the first Auburn woman swimmer to medal in an Olympics in the 2004 Athens games when she won gold, silver and bronze in the 200 backstroke, 100 backstroke, and the 200 Individual Medley respectively. She is the first and (as of 2008) the only person ever to medal in an individual event in the Olympics for her native country, Zimbabwe. In the 2008 Olympics, Coventry surpassed Rowdy Gaines in most medals won in a single games (four) and in career medals (seven) for the swimming program. In total for the 2004 Athens games, Auburn sent 12 athletes to the games with five medals, a then Auburn record-tying performance for a single Olympics. Auburn broke that record in the 2008 Olympics, winning 13 total medals in swimming. Former Tiger Zach Apple competed on two USA relay teams in the 2021 Olympics in Tokyo, with the teams taking gold in both. Annie Lazor took bronze in the women's breaststroke.

==== Summer Olympic Games Beijing 2008 ====
Auburn swimmers Kirsty Coventry and César Cielo both won multiple medals at the 2008 Summer Olympics in Beijing. Coventry returned after winning gold, silver and bronze in Athens, this time she won a gold medal in the 200 backstroke and three silvers in the 100 back, as well as the 200 and 400 Medley relays. Cielo won a gold medal in the 50 free and a bronze in the 100 meter freestyle. In total former or current Auburn swimmers won 13 medals at the Olympics representing various nations around the world. The 13 medals was the most of a single university in swimming. As a result of these Olympic games, Coventry set an Auburn career record for Olympic medals and the record for most medals in a games by an Auburn athlete.

Athlete	Nation	Total	Gold	Silver	Bronze	Events
Frédérick Bousquet	FRA (France)	1	0	1	0	Silver Medal in 400m Freestyle relay
César Cielo Filho	BRA (Brazil)	2	1	0	1	Gold Medal in 50m Freestyle and bronze medal for 100m Freestyle
Kirsty Coventry	ZIM (Zimbabwe)	4	1	3	0	Gold Medal in 200m backstroke, Silver Medal in 100m backstroke, 200m Medley and 400m Medley.
Mark Gangloff	USA (United States)	1	1	0	0	Gold Medal in 400m Medley Relay
Margaret Hoelzer	USA (United States)	3	0	2	1	Silver Medal in 200m backstroke, 400m Medley, Bronze Medal in 100m backstroke
Matt Targett	AUS (Australia)	2	0	1	1	Silver Medal in 400m Medley Relay, Bronze Medal in 400m freestyle relay

== Notable Auburn swimmers ==
=== Men's ===
- (France) Frédérick Bousquet
- (Trinidad and Tobago) George Bovell
- (United States) Matthew Busbee
- (Brazil) César Cielo Filho
- (United States) David Denniston
- (United States) Rowdy Gaines
- (United States) Mark Gangloff
- (United States) Eric Shanteau
- (Australia) Matt Targett
- (Venezuela) Oswaldo Quevedo
- (United States) Tyler McGill
- (Sweden) Per Johansson
- (France) Romain Barnier
- (United States) Zane Grothe
- (France) Xavier Marchand

=== Women's ===
- (Panama) Eileen Coparropa
- (Zimbabwe) Kirsty Coventry – became International Olympic Committee president in 2025
- (The Bahamas) Alana Dillette
- (United States) Margaret Hoelzer
- (Canada) Stephanie Horner
- (United States) Hayley Peirsol
- (The Bahamas) Arianna Vanderpool-Wallace
- (United States) Carrie Willoughby
