= Swimming at the 1984 Summer Olympics – Women's 200 metre breaststroke =

Women's 200 metre breaststroke at the Games of the XXIII Olympiad
- Venue: McDonald's Olympic Swim Stadium
- Date: July 30, 1984 (heats & finals)
- Competitors: 23 from 16 nations
- Winning time: 2:30.38 AM

Medalists
1st place, gold medalist(s)		Anne Ottenbrite	Canada
2nd place, silver medalist(s)		Susan Rapp	United States
3rd place, bronze medalist(s)		Ingrid Lempereur	Belgium

The final of the women's 200 metre breaststroke event at the 1984 Summer Olympics was held in the McDonald's Olympic Swim Stadium in Los Angeles, California, on July 30, 1984.

== Records ==
Prior to this competition, the existing world and Olympic records were as follows.

World record	Lina Kačiušytė (URS)	2:28.36	Potsdam, East Germany	6 April 1979
Olympic record	Lina Kačiušytė (URS)	2:29.54	Moscow, Soviet Union	23 July 1980

== Results ==
=== Heats ===
Rule: The eight fastest swimmers advance to final A (Q), while the next eight to final B (q).

Rank	Heat	Lane	Name	Nationality	Time	Notes
1	1	2	Ingrid Lempereur	Belgium	2:32.46	Q, NR
2	2	6	Sharon Kellett	Australia	2:33.23	Q, NR
3	1	4	Anne Ottenbrite	Canada	2:33.43	Q
4	2	4	Susan Rapp	United States	2:33.46	Q
5	3	4	Hiroko Nagasaki	Japan	2:34.46	Q
5	3	5	Ute Hasse	West Germany	2:34.46	Q
7	2	3	Suki Brownsdon	Great Britain	2:35.54	Q
7	3	3	Kim Rhodenbaugh	United States	2:35.54	Q
9	3	6	Manuela Dalla Valle	Italy	2:35.75	q
10	2	5	Laura Belotti	Italy	2:35.99	q
11	1	3	Alicia María Boscatto	Argentina	2:36.38	q
12	1	5	Mary Lubawski	Canada	2:36.65	q
13	1	6	Petra van Staveren	Netherlands	2:37.20	q
14	2	2	Annelie Holmström	Sweden	2:37.21	q
15	3	2	Dimity Douglas	Australia	2:38.47	q
16	2	7	Gaynor Stanley	Great Britain	2:38.54	q
17	3	1	Sara Guido	Mexico	2:38.87	NR
18	3	7	Petra Hillenius	Netherlands	2:41.57	
19	1	7	Kaori Iwasaki	Japan	2:42.69	
20	2	1	Guðrún Ágústsdóttir	Iceland	2:44.85	NR
21	3	8	Rosa María Silva	Uruguay	2:50.01	
22	1	1	Chow Lai Yee	Hong Kong	2:50.45	
23	2	8	Isabel Lardizábal	Honduras	3:04.26	

=== Finals ===
==== Final B ====
Rank	Lane	Name	Nationality	Time	Notes
9	4	Manuela Dalla Valle	Italy	2:36.23	
10	2	Petra van Staveren	Netherlands	2:36.32	
11	5	Laura Belotti	Italy	2:36.49	
12	6	Mary Lubawski	Canada	2:36.55	
13	3	Alicia María Boscatto	Argentina	2:36.96	
14	7	Annelie Holmström	Sweden	2:37.62	
15	8	Gaynor Stanley	Great Britain	2:39.32	
16	1	Dimity Douglas	Australia	2:39.33	

==== Final A ====
Rank	Lane	Name	Nationality	Time	Notes
1st place, gold medalist(s)	3	Anne Ottenbrite	Canada	2:30.38	AM
2nd place, silver medalist(s)	6	Susan Rapp	United States	2:31.15	NR
3rd place, bronze medalist(s)	4	Ingrid Lempereur	Belgium	2:31.40	NR
4	2	Hiroko Nagasaki	Japan	2:32.93	
5	5	Sharon Kellett	Australia	2:33.60	
6	7	Ute Hasse	West Germany	2:33.82	NR
7	1	Suki Brownsdon	Great Britain	2:35.07	
8	8	Kim Rhodenbaugh	United States	2:35.51	
