= 2000 NCAA Division I Men's Swimming and Diving Championships =

American college aquatic sports competition

2000 NCAA Division I Swimming and Diving Championships
- Host city: Minneapolis, Minnesota
- Date: March 2000
- Venue(s): University Aquatic Center; University of Minnesota

The 2000 NCAA Division I Men's Swimming and Diving Championships were contested in March 2000 at the University Aquatic Center at the University of Minnesota in Minneapolis, Minnesota at the 77th annual NCAA-sanctioned swim meet to determine the team and individual national champions of Division I men's collegiate swimming and diving in the United States.

Along with the 2004 edition, this was one of only two NCAA championship meets held in short course meters (25 m) rather than the NCAA's traditional short-course yards (25 yd) format. This allowed world records to be set at the competition.

Texas topped the team standings, finishing 153 points ahead of Stanford.

== Team standings ==
- Note: Top 10 only
- (H) = Hosts
- ^{(DC)} = Defending champions
- Full results

Rank	Team	Points
1st place, gold medalist(s)	Texas	538
2nd place, silver medalist(s)	Auburn ^{(DC)}	385
3rd place, bronze medalist(s)	Arizona	360 1/2
4	Stanford	279 1/2
5	California	279
6	USC	249
7	Minnesota (H); Tennessee	219
9	Florida	207
10	Arizona State	152 1/2

== Swimming results ==
Event	Gold		Silver		Bronze	
50 m freestyle	Anthony Ervin; California	21.21; WR	Roland Schoeman; Arizona	21.22	Gregory Busse; Auburn	21.49
100 m freestyle	Anthony Ervin; California	47.36; US	Roland Schoeman; Arizona	47.51	Bartosz Kizierowski; California	47.76
200 m freestyle	Ryk Neethling; Arizona	1:43.90; US	Adam Messner; Stanford	1:45.01	Jamie Rauch; Texas	1:46.35
400 m freestyle	Ryk Neethling; Arizona	3:40.47; US	Erik Vendt; USC	3:42.81	Chris Thompson; Michigan	3:43.81
1500 m freestyle	Erik Vendt; USC	14:31.02; US, AR	Chris Thompson; Michigan	14:35.95	Ryk Neethling; Arizona	14:39.04
100 m backstroke	Matthew Ulrickson; Texas	52.05	Riley Janes; Texas A&M	52.18	Alexandre Massura; Minnesota	52.24
200 m backstroke	Matthew Cole; Florida	1:53.68	Leonardo Costa; USC	1:54.79	Alexandre Massura; Minnesota	1:54.99
100 m breaststroke	Ed Moses; Virginia	57.66; WR	David Denniston; Auburn	58.68	Jeremy McDonnell; Tennessee	59.37
200 m breaststroke	Ed Moses; Virginia	2:06.40; WR	David Denniston; Auburn	2:09.46	Jeff Hackler; Michigan	2:09.81
100 m butterfly	Adam Pine; Nebraska	51.23; US	Nate Dusing; Texas	52.00	Roland Schoeman; Arizona	52.14
200 m butterfly	Adam Messner; Stanford	1:55.79	Zsolt Gáspár; USC	1:55.88	Jeffrey Somensatto; Auburn	1:56.47
200 m IM	Attila Czene; Arizona State	1:54.65; WR	Nate Dusing; Texas	1:56.84	Beau Wiebel; Georgia	1:57.86
400 m IM	Tim Siciliano; Michigan	4:06.02; US, AR	Erik Vendt; USC	4:09.35	Kevin Clements; Auburn	4:10.43
200 m freestyle relay	Auburn; Matthew Busbee (21.77); Aaron Ciarla (21.09); Oswaldo Quevedo (21.34); Gregory Busse (20.94)	1:25.14	California; Anthony Ervin (21.32); Matt Macedo (21.12); Scott Greenwood (21.71); Bartosz Kizierowski (21.06)	1:25.21	Arizona; Roland Schoeman (21.28); Coley Stickels (21.73); Rob Henikman (21.80); Jay Schryver (21.93)	1:26.74
400 m freestyle relay	California; Matt Macedo (47.81); Anthony Ervin (47.32); Bartosz Kizierowski (46.92); Lars Merseburg (49.20)	3:11.25; US	Texas; Nate Dusing (48.30); Jamie Rauch (48.15); Matthew Ulrickson (47.92); Bryan Jones (48.19)	3:12.56	Arizona; Roland Schoeman (47.95); Coley Stickels (48.02); Jay Schryver (49.07); Ryk Neethling (48.14)	3:13.18
800 m freestyle relay	Texas; Jon Younghouse (1:47.34); Nate Dusing (1:44.90); Scott Goldblatt (1:46.52); Jamie Rauch (1:46.29)	7:05.05; US	Arizona State; Attila Czene (1:46.25); Anders Lyrbring (1:47.89); Bo West (1:47.99); Scott VonSchoff (1:47.27)	7:09.40	Stanford; Greg Long (1:48.92); John Waters (1:47.41); Steve Brown (1:49.02); Adam Messner (1:46.13)	7:11.48
200 m medley relay	Texas; Matthew Ulrickson (23.96); Russell Chozick (27.62); Nate Dusing (22.52); Bryan Jones (21.56)	1:35.66; US, AR	Arizona; Matt Allen (24.47); Rob Henikman (27.43); Roland Schoeman (22.66); Coley Stickels (21.31)	1:35.87	Tennessee; Michael Gilliam (24.15); Jeremy McDonnell (26.97); Justin Hoggatt (23.14); Chris Hussey (21.67)	1:35.93
400 m medley relay	Texas; Tommy Hannan (52.15); Russell Chozick (59.70); Nate Dusing (51.48); Bryan Jones (47.90)	3:31.23; US	Tennessee; Michael Gilliam (52.39); Jeremy McDonnell (58.85); Joel Shapiro (52.71); Chris Hussey (48.27)	3:32.22	Auburn; Kirk Hampleman (54.02); David Denniston (58.73); Oswaldo Quevedo (52.36); Gregory Busse (47.58)	3:32.69

Legend: WR – World record; US – U.S. Open record; AR – American record;

== Diving results ==
Event	Gold		Silver		Bronze	
1 m diving	Troy Dumais; Texas	605.20	Shannon Roy; Tennessee	570.95	Imre Lengyel; Miami	565.40
3 m diving	Troy Dumais; Texas	662.65	Stefan Ahrens; Miami	624.05	Imre Lengyel; Miami	614.50
Platform diving	Tyce Routson; Miami	596.10	Troy Dumais; Texas	588.80	Kyle Prandi; Miami	574.65

== See also ==
- List of college swimming and diving teams
