= Christopher Murray (swimmer) =

Bahamian swimmer (born 1978)

Personal information
- Full name: Christopher Murray
- National team: Bahamas
- Born: 28 November 1978 (age 47) Freeport, Bahamas
- Height: 1.94 m (6 ft 4 in)
- Weight: 90 kg (198 lb)

Sport
- Sport: Swimming
- Strokes: Freestyle
- Club: Freeport Aquatics Club
- College team: University of Georgia (U.S.)
- Coach: Jack Bauerle (U.S.)

Christopher Murray (born November 28, 1978) is a Bahamian former swimmer who specialized in sprint freestyle events. He represented his nation Bahamas, along with his older brother and three-time Olympic veteran Allan Murray, at the 2000 Summer Olympics in Sydney, and later held a Bahamian record in the 100 m freestyle at the Georgia Short Course Invitational. While studying in the United States, Murray trains with his brother Allan for the University of Georgia's Georgia Bulldogs swimming and diving team under head coach Jack Bauerle. He also earned All-American honorable mentions as the leadoff in the team's 200 and 400-yard freestyle relays at the 2000 NCAA Men's Swimming and Diving Championships.

Murray qualified for the men's 100 m freestyle at the 2000 Summer Olympics in Sydney by posting a FINA B-standard of 51.97 from the Pan American Games in Winnipeg, Manitoba, Canada. He challenged seven other swimmers in heat four, including three-time Olympic veterans Indrek Sei of Estonia and Carl Probert of Fiji. Murray managed to record his personal best of 51.93, but came up short in second place by almost six tenths of a second (0.6) behind Probert. Murray failed to advance into the semifinals, as he placed fortieth overall in the prelims.

== See also ==
- List of University of Georgia people
