= Gabrielsen Natatorium =

Swimming facility in Athens, Georgia

Coordinates: 33.937829°N 83.371323°W

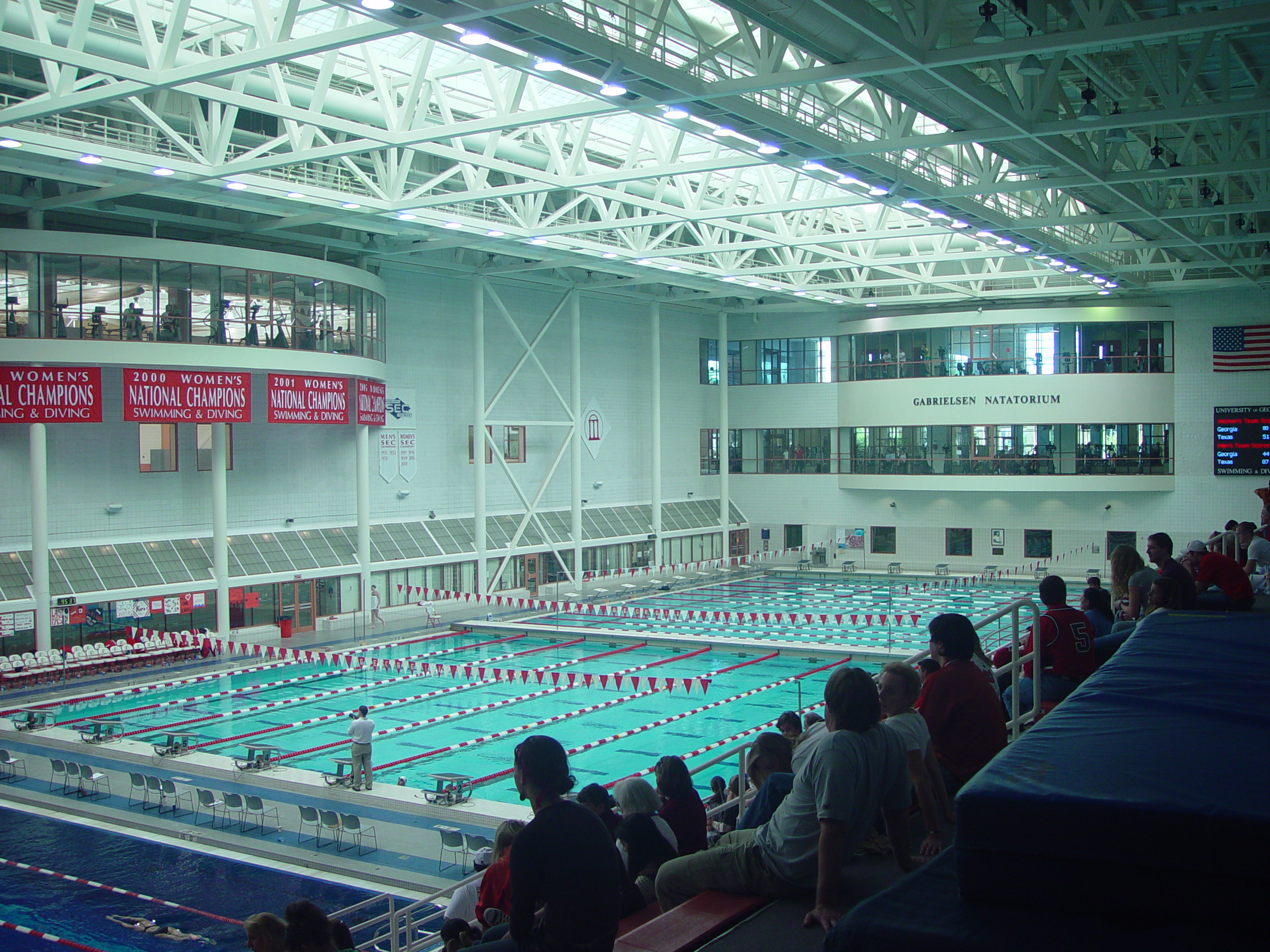
- Competition pool
- Interactive map of Gabrielsen Natatorium
- Full name: Gabrielsen Natatorium
- Address: Athens, Georgia, USA
- Capacity: ~2,000

Construction
- Opened: 1995

Tenant
- Georgia Bulldogs swimming and diving

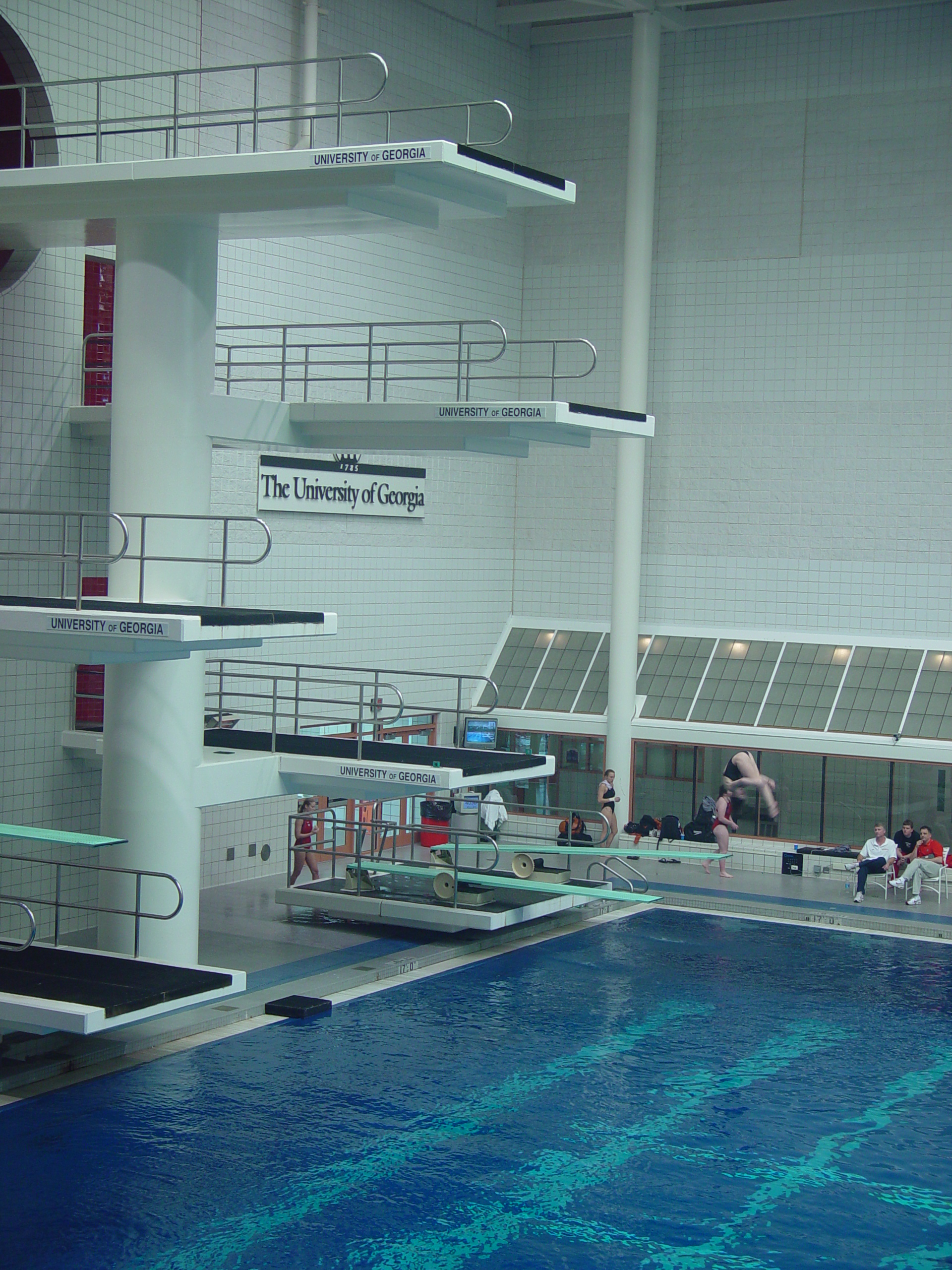
Diving springboards and platforms

Gabrielsen Natatorium is a swimming and diving facility at the University of Georgia (UGA) in Athens, Georgia, U.S.A. The natatorium is home to the university's varsity swimming and diving programs and seats almost 2,000 spectators.

== History ==
The facility was dedicated in 1996 and is named after B.W. Gabrielsen, the head coach of the team from 1948 to 1966. In 1999 and 2006, the pool hosted the NCAA Women's Swimming and Diving Championships. The pool also hosted the NCAA Men's Swimming and Diving Championships in 2002 and the USA Diving World Championship Trials in 2003.

== Facility ==
The natatorium is housed within the Ramsey Center, the student physical activity center at UGA. The natatorium has three separate pools: a 50-meter competition pool (844,000 gallons of water) with two movable bulkheads; a diving pool (525,000 gallons of water) with two 1-meter springboards, two 3-meter springboards, five diving platforms (1, 3, 5, 7.5 and 10-meters), and an air sparger system; an instructional and recreational pool (130,000 gallons of water) that is 25-yards long with eight swimming lanes.
