= Jack Bauerle =

American swimming coach

Current position
- Record: Women: 287–33–1 (.896); Men: 201–87–1 (.697); Total: 488–120–2 (.802)

Biographical details
- Born: February 7, 1952 (age 74); Glenside, Pennsylvania, U.S.
- Education: University of Georgia

Playing career
- 1971-1974: University of Georgia (UGA); Coached by Pete Scholle
- Positions: Butterfly, Freestyle

Coaching career (HC unless noted)
- 1975-2022: UGA Women's Team (Asst.)
- 1978-2022: UGA Women's Team
- 1983-2022: UGA Men's Team
- 2000: U.S. Olympic Team (Asst.)
- 2001: FINA World Championships (Asst.)
- 2003: FINA World Championships
- 2005: FINA World Championships
- 2008: U.S. Olympic Team
- 2011: FINA World Championships

Accomplishments and honors

Championships
- SEC Women's Championships (1997, 1998, 1999, 2000, 2001, 2006, 2010, 2011, 2012, 2013, 2014); NCAA Women's Championship (1999, 2000, 2001, 2005, 2013, 2014, 2016)

Awards
- SEC Women's Coach of the Year (1981, 1986, 1991, 1997, 1998, 1999, 2000, 2001, 2004, 2005, 2006, 2010, 2011, 2013); SEC Men's Coach of the Year (1992, 1997); NCAA Women's Coach of the Year (1998, 1999, 2000, 2005, 2006, 2013, 2016)

Jack Bauerle (born February 7, 1952) was a swimmer who competed for the University of Georgia and is the former head coach of the University of Georgia (UGA) men's and women's swimming teams. With a long and highly distinguished career, Bauerle began coaching the University of Georgia women's team in 1979 and continued through 2022, then coached the men's team from 1983-2022. He served as coach for the 2020 US Olympic Swim Team at the 2020 Summer Olympics in Tokyo, Japan.

== Personal life and early swimming career ==
Bauerle began swimming in the Philadelphia area at the Germantown YMCA, the Manor Lu Swim Club, and the Philadelphia Aquatic Club. As a senior in 1970, he was a co-captain of the La Salle College High School team and swam on four teams that won the Philadelphia Catholic League Championships. In 2010 Bauerle was inducted into the La Salle College High School Alumni Hall of Fame. He has three children, John, Magill, and Duke.

As a varsity swimmer at UGA from 1971–72 to 1974–75, Bauerle swam for head coach Pete Scholle and set UGA records in the 200-yard butterfly, 1,000- and 1,650-yard freestyle events, and served as the team captain of the 1973–74 and 1974–75 squads.

He earned a Bachelor of Arts in English from the University of Georgia in 1975.

== Career accomplishments ==
=== University of Georgia coaching career ===
Bauerle began coaching the University of Georgia women's team in 1979 and continued as coach through 2022, and coached the men's team from 1983-2022.

Throughout much of his coaching tenure from 1982-2012, his Assistant Coach was former U. Georgia swimmer Harvey Humphries, who would become Associate Head Coach from 2012-2019. During his Georgia tenure, Bauerle coached Samantha Arsenault from 2003-2005 after she won a gold medal in the 4x200 freestyle relay in the 2000 Sydney Olympics.

In 2000 Bauerle was an Assistant Olympic swim coach; in 2003 and 2005, he was head coach for the Women's USA World Championship Team. On September 8, 2006, USA Swimming announced that Bauerle would be the head coach of the United States women's swimming team at the 2008 Summer Olympics. Bauerle has been named NCAA coach of the year five times and SEC coach of the year 12 times. As of the 2014 season, Bauerle's teams have won six NCAA Women's national championships, and eleven SEC Women's championships, finishing second nationally seven times and in the top five 22 times. As of 2013 season, he had coached 152 All-American women swimmers (including 690 First-Team and 375 Honorable Mention certificates), 92 All-American men swimmers (including 126 First-Team and 387 Honorable Mention certificates), and three Olympic gold medalists. At the end of his coaching career, Bauerle finished his 42nd year as a head coach for the UGA women's team and his 35th year as men's head coach.

=== 2020 Summer Olympics ===
Bauerle was one of the nine assistant coaches to head coaches David Durden and Greg Meehan for the 2020 US Olympic Swim Team at the 2020 Summer Olympics in Tokyo, Japan, which were held in 2021 due to the COVID-19 pandemic. The Georgia Bulldogs contingent consisting of seven swimmers, Javier Acevedo, Hali Flickinger, Natalie Hinds, Chase Kalisz, Jay Litherland, Allison Schmitt, and Olivia Smoliga, representing two different countries, United States and Canada, for which Bauerle served as the head coach, was the largest group of NCAA swimmers from a single college or university in the United States to compete at the 2020 Olympic Games. Five of Bauerle's past and present Bulldogs students won five Olympic medals in one day at the competition, including Chase Kalisz who won the first Olympic medal in any sport at the 2020 Olympic Games for the United States. Bauerle's was nominated by the USA Swimming Foundation for their 2021 Golden Goggle Award for "Coach of the Year".

In 2023, he retired from coaching and received a Lifetime Achievement Award from the Executive Board of the College Swimming & Diving Coaches Association of America (CSCAA).

== Awards and honors ==
- Golden Goggle Award nominee, Coach of the Year: 2021
- Lifetime Achievement Award, CSCAA: 2023

== See also ==
- Georgia Bulldogs
- List of University of Georgia people
- List of Swimmers
- Swimming
