= James E. Martin Aquatics Center =

Auburn University swimming complex

Coordinates: 32°35′59″N 85°29′36″W

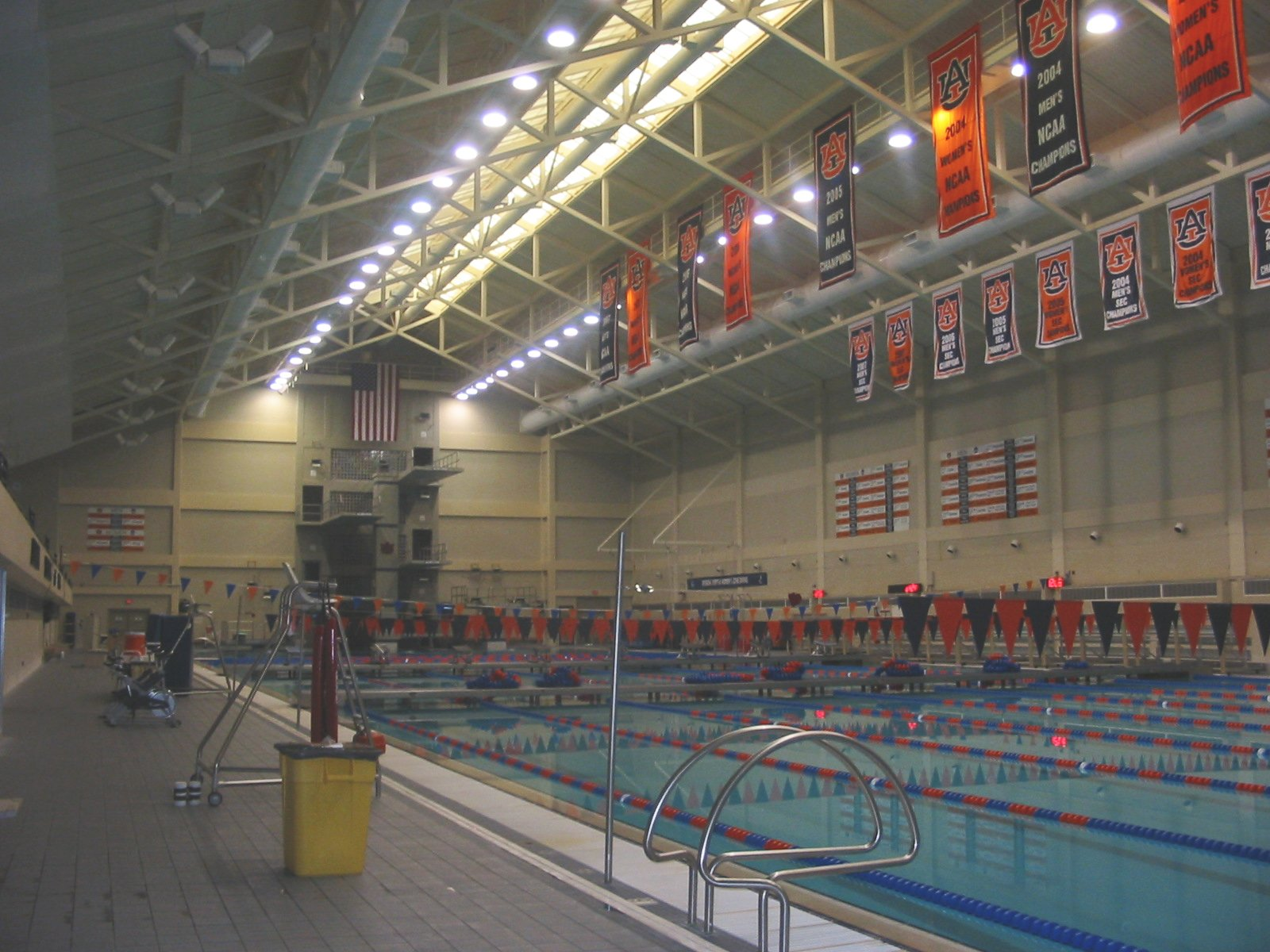
- Interactive map of James E. Martin Aquatics Center
- Full name: James E. Martin Aquatics Center
- Address: Auburn, Alabama, United States
- Capacity: 1,800 (Indoor pool)

Construction
- Opened: 1993

Tenants
- Auburn University (NCAA); Auburn High School (AHSAA); Auburn Aquatics

The James E. Martin Aquatics Center is a swimming complex on the Auburn University campus in Auburn, Alabama. It is the home pool of the Auburn University and Auburn High School swimming and diving programs. The Martin Aquatics Center has hosted the NCAA Men's (1998) and Women's (2003) Swimming and Diving Championships, as well as the US Open in 1995, 2000, and 2005. In 2002, Sports Illustrated rated the Martin Aquatics Center indoor pool the third-fastest pool in the United States.

== Facility ==
The 77,629 ft^{2} James E. Martin Aquatics Center consists of three pools: an indoor training pool (built in 1969), an outdoor training pool (2007), a competition pool with diving well (1993). The Center is named for James E. Martin, President of Auburn University from 1984 through 1992, who spearheaded the facility's construction.

=== Competition pool ===
The Martin Aquatics Center competition pool was constructed in 1993 as part of a $10.5 million expansion to the previous swimming facility. The pool is 77 metres (253 ft)×25 metres (82 ft), with a general depth of 9 feet (2.7 m)-10 feet (3.0 m) extending to 16.5 feet (5.0 m) in the diving well. The pool has two moveable bulkheads allowing for variable distance competitions and simultaneous diving. The pool contains a gutter system which minimizes wave reflection along the sides of the pool, as well as a water pass-through system in the bulkheads which reduces wave reflection on turns. The diving area contains platforms of the following heights: 1 metre (3.3 ft), 3 metres (9.8 ft), 5 metres (16 ft), 7.5 metres (25 ft) and 10 metres (33 ft), and springboards of the following heights: two 1 metre (3.3 ft) and two 3 metres (9.8 ft) . The facility contains seating for 1000 spectators and 800 competitors.

=== Training pools ===
The facility contains an indoor training pool, constructed in 1969, which previously served as the competition pool, and an outdoor pool, completed in 2007 at a cost of approximately $2 million. The outdoor training pool is 50×25 m with 10 lanes.

== History ==
The oldest part of the Martin Aquatic Center was a 1969 pool that is currently used as the indoor training pool. In the early 1990s construction began on a $10.5 million expansion of that facility to include the current competition area. The facility was opened in 1993 and dedicated on April 30, 1994 as the James E. Martin Aquatics Center. In its first year, the facility hosted the Southeastern Conference championships, followed by the US Open in 1995.

In 1996, the facility hosted the Olympic swimming and diving teams of China, Japan, Finland, Israel and South Africa and the United States water polo team training for the 1996 Summer Olympics in nearby Atlanta, Georgia. In 1998, the NCAA Men's Swimming and Diving Championships were held at the Aquatic Center, and in 2000 the US Open returned. Martin hosted both the SEC championships and the NCAA Women's Swimming and Diving Championships in 2003, and the US Open in 2005. In 2007, a new outdoor training pool was opened adjacent to the facility.
