= Mary Lubawski =

Canadian swimmer (born 1965)

Mary Lottie (Lubawski) Hoyt
Personal information
- Full name: Mary Lubawski
- National team: Canada
- Born: April 15, 1965 (age 61) Toronto, Ontario, Canada
- Height: 1.68 m (5 ft 6 in)
- Weight: 51 kg (112 lb)
- Spouse: Rick Hoyt

Sport
- Sport: Swimming
- Strokes: Breaststroke
- Club: Etobicoke Swim Club
- College team: University of Georgia

Mary Lubawski (born April 15, 1965) is a former breaststroke swimmer who represented Canada at the 1984 Summer Olympics in Los Angeles, California. Lubawski advanced to the B Final of the 200-metre breaststroke, and finished in 12th place overall.

Mary Lubawski married Rick Hoyt and became Mary Hoyt on August 6, 1988.

== See also ==
- List of University of Georgia people
