= Catherine Poirot =

French swimmer (born 1963)

Personal information
- Born: April 9, 1963 (age 63) Tours, France

Sport
- Sport: Swimming
- Strokes: Breaststroke
Medal record
Representing France
Olympic Games
Bronze medal – third place	1984 Los Angeles	100 m breaststroke

Catherine Poirot (French: [katʁin pwaʁo]; born 9 April 1963) is a French former breaststroke swimmer who competed in the 1980 Summer Olympics and in the 1984 Summer Olympics.
