= Laura Belotti =

Italian swimmer

Personal information
- Born: 2 December 1966 (age 59) Rome, Italy

Sport
- Sport: Swimming

Laura Belotti (born 2 December 1966) is an Italian swimmer. She competed in the women's 200 metre breaststroke at the 1984 Summer Olympics.
