= David McLellan (swimmer) =

Canadian swimmer

Personal information
- Full name: David Charles McLellan
- National team: Canada
- Born: July 27, 1973 (age 52) London, Ontario
- Height: 1.82 m (6 ft 0 in)
- Weight: 80 kg (180 lb)

Sport
- Sport: Swimming
- Strokes: Freestyle
- College team: University of Georgia

David Charles McLellan (born July 27, 1973) is a former competitive swimmer in the long-distance freestyle events, who represented Canada at the 1992 Summer Olympics in Barcelona, Spain. There he finished in 23rd position in the 1500-metre freestyle.

As an active member of the London (Ontario) Aquatic Club, David has been recognized for his achievements by the LAC by having his name placed on the Wall of Fame and also holds club records in the following events:

- 15/17 Boys 1500 Freestyle (25M / Short Course) 15:09.52 (1991)
- Open Mens 400 Freestyle (25M / Short Course) 3:52.04 (1992)
- Open Mens 800 Freestyle (25M / Short Course) 7:54.02 (1992)
- Open Mens 800 Freestyle (50M / Long Course) 8:08.39 (1992)
- Open Mens 1500 Freestyle (25M / Short Course) 15:08.17 (1992)

In addition to his swimming career, David is currently the Chief Executive, Financial and Operating Officer (CEO, CFO, COO) for the GDLS Wednesday Hockey League (WHL) which plays out of the Western Fair District Sports Complex and is based in London, Ontario.

== See also ==
- List of University of Georgia people
