= Allen Greene =

American athletics director

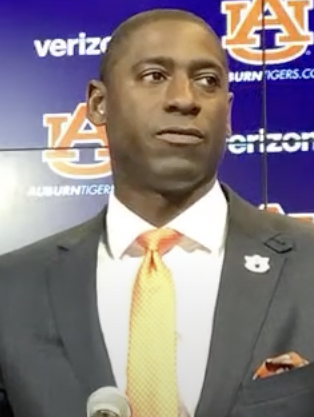
- Greene in 2019

Current position
- Title: Athletic director
- Team: Pittsburgh
- Conference: ACC

Biographical details
- Born: April 10, 1977 (age 49); Seattle, Washington, U.S.

Playing career
- 1996–1998: Notre Dame
- 1998: Oneonta Yankees
- 1999: Greensboro Bats
- 2000: Tampa Yankees
- 2001: Elmira Pioneers
- Position: Outfield

Administrative career (AD unless noted)
- 2009–2012: Ole Miss (Assistant AD)
- 2012–2015: Buffalo (Deputy AD)
- 2015–2018: Buffalo
- 2018–2022: Auburn
- 2022–2023: Ole Miss (Senior Deputy AD)
- 2023–2024: Tennessee (Senior Deputy AD)
- 2024–present: Pittsburgh

Claude Allen Greene IV, (born April 10, 1977) is the director of athletics at the University of Pittsburgh, a position to which he was named on October 18, 2024. He previously served as the director of athletics for Auburn University from 2018 to 2022, and for the University at Buffalo, and as assistant athletic director for the University of Mississippi and the senior deputy athletics director and chief operating officer at the University of Tennessee. Greene attended college at the University of Notre Dame, and was a two-year starter on the Notre Dame Fighting Irish baseball team. He was a ninth-round draft pick of the New York Yankees in the 1998 Major League Baseball draft, and went on to a four-year career in the minor leagues for the Yankees, playing for the Oneonta Yankees, Greensboro Bats, Tampa Yankees, and Elmira Pioneers. He grew up in Bellevue, Washington and attended O'Dea High School in Seattle, playing baseball and basketball, graduating 1995.
