= Petra van Staveren =

Dutch swimmer (born 1966)

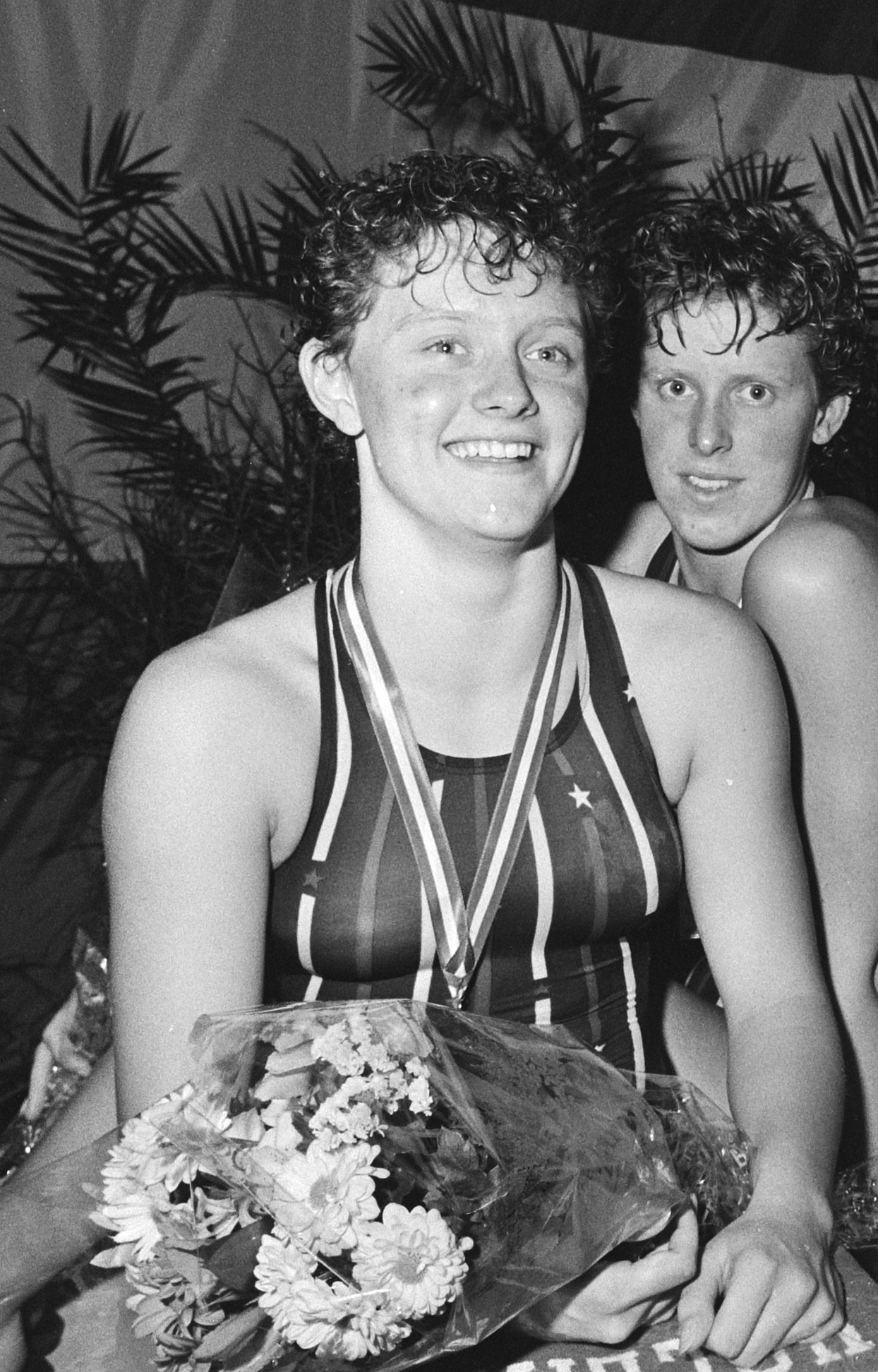
- Petra van Staveren in 1984

Personal information
- Born: 2 June 1966 (age 60) Kampen, Netherlands
- Height: 1.69 m (5 ft 7 in)
- Weight: 66 kg (146 lb)

Sport
- Sport: Swimming
- Club: De Steur, Kampen
Medal record
Representing Netherlands
Olympic Games
Gold medal – first place	1984 Los Angeles	100 m breaststroke
World Championships
Bronze medal – third place	1986 Madrid	4×100 m medley
European Championships
Silver medal – second place	1983 Rome	4×100 m medley

Petronella ("Petra") Grietje van Staveren (born 2 June 1966) is a former breaststroke swimmer from the Netherlands who won the gold medal in the 100 meter breaststroke at the 1984 Summer Olympics in Los Angeles. She also won a bronze at the 1986 world championships and a European silver in 1983 in the 4×100 meter medley relay. She finished five times in fourth place at European championships in 1981–1985.
