= Petra Hillenius =

Dutch swimmer (1968–2020)

Personal information
- Full name: Petronella Angela "Petra" Hillenius
- Nationality: Dutch
- Born: 7 February 1968 Woerden, the Netherlands
- Died: 27 March 2020 (aged 52)

Sport
- Sport: Swimming

Petronella Angela "Petra" Hillenius (7 February 1968 in Woerden - 27 March 2020) was a Dutch breaststroke swimmer, who competed at the 1984 Olympics in Los Angeles. She finished 19th in the 100 metre breaststroke and 18th in the 200 metre breaststroke.

In 2014, she became a board member of the Royal Dutch Swimming Federation. She resigned the position when she was diagnosed with ALS four years later. In March 2020 she died due to ALS.

She was a teacher for 24 years at the Hospitality Business School of the Saxion University of Applied Sciences.
