= Harvey Humphries =

American competitive swimmer

Biographical details
- Born: circa 1958; Little Rock, Arkansas
- Education: University of Georgia

Playing career
- 1975–1976 1978–1979: University of Georgia

Coaching career (HC unless noted)
- 1979–1982: University of Georgia; Graduate Assistant Coach
- 1982–2012: University of Georgia; Full-time Assistant Coach
- 2012–2019: University of Georgia; Associate Head Coach
- 1981–2023: Athens Bull Dogs Swim Club

Head coaching record
- Overall: 152-58 (U. Georgia Men); 173-23 (U. Georgia Women)

Accomplishments and honors

Championships
- 7 NCAA Team National Championships (U Georgia Women); 12 SEC Conference Team Titles (Georgia)

Awards
- ASCA Hall of Fame 2022; 2011 Schluetter Award (Georgia Bulldogs); 2003 Arkansas Swimming Hall of Fame

Harvey Humphries was an American competitive swimmer for the University of Georgia and a swimming coach for Georgia from 1979 to 2019, where he led the team to seven NCAA team national championships, twelve Southeastern Conference (SEC) team titles, and a total 99 relay and individual national titles.

A Little Rock, Arkansas native, Humphries began his swimming career in 1964 with the Little Rock Boy's Club, and swam for Little Rock's Catholic High School for Boys Swim team.

He competed with the University of Georgia swim team from 1975 to 1976 and from 1978 to 1979. He lettered all four years, and was a team co-captain, graduating in 1980 with a degree in Macrobiology. He and his wife Wendy have two children.

== Coaching ==
Humphries coached the University of Georgia as a graduate assistant from 1979 to 1982. With age group swimming, he served as the Coach of the Athens Bulldogs Swim Club for 42 years from 1981 through 2023. From 1982 to 2012, he was Georgia's full time Assistant Coach, and served from 2012 through 2019 as the University of Georgia's Senior Associate Head Coach, before retiring in July. Under Humphrie's tenure, Georgia swimmers have won seven NCAA team level national championships, twelve SEC Team Conference Championships, and ninety-nine relay and individual national titles. The Georgia Men's team have had seventeen NCAA finishes in the top ten.

After Humphries retirement from coaching, he accepted a position as Georgia's Program Coordinator for swimming. As the university's chief recruiter in their swimming program, he consistently acquired the most outstanding distance swimmers in the history of the NCAA. His recruits captured a combined 22 NCAA and 57 SEC titles, in three primary distance events consisting of the 400 IM, the 500 freestyle and the 1,650 freestyle.

=== International coaching ===
Humphries was appointed to the staff of the World University Games in Thailand for 2007, in China for 2011 and in South Korea for 2015. In the spring of 1997, In 1997, he served as Assistant Women's Coach of the U.S. National Junior Team in Sweden, and in Colorado coached the U.S. National Junior Team's fall training camp.

In 1999 in Spain, he served as an assistant coach of the National Junior Team and was the head coach for the 2002 Men's National Junior Team in Italian competition.

=== Honors ===
He was a recipient of the Schluetter Award in 2011, for top nationally ranked age group coaches, recognizing his 40-year tenure with the Athens Bull Dog Swim Club. He became a member of the Arkansas Swimming Hall of Fame in 2003, and in 2016 became the Established Assistant Coach of the Year in 2016. He was inducted in the American Swimming Coaches Association Hall of Fame in 2022, and is also a member of the Georgia Sports Hall of Fame. Humphries received the Georgia Senior Coach of the Year twice, in 1997 and 1998.
