= Ingrid Lempereur =

Belgian swimmer (born 1969)

Personal information
- Born: 26 June 1969 (age 57)
Medal record
Women's swimming
Representing Belgium
Olympic Games
Bronze medal – third place	1984 Los Angeles	200m breaststroke
European Championships (LC)
Silver medal – second place	1987 Strasbourg	200m breaststroke
Summer Universiade
Gold medal – first place	1987 Zagreb	200m breaststroke
Silver medal – second place	1987 Zagreb	100m breaststroke

Ingrid Lempereur (born 26 June 1969 in Messancy, Province of Luxembourg, Belgium) is a former international swimmer from Belgium. She won the bronze medal in the 200 m breaststroke race at the 1984 Summer Olympics in Los Angeles at the age of 15.
