= Matthew Busbee =

American swimmer

Sport
- Sport: Swimming
- College team: Auburn Tigers
Medal record
Swimming
NCAA Championships (Div I)
Gold medal – first place	1997 Minneapolis	4x200m freestyle relay
Gold medal – first place	1999 Indianapolis	4x200m freestyle relay
Gold medal – first place	2000 Minneapolis	4x200m freestyle relay

Matthew Busbee was fourteen-time All-American swimmer, three-time NCAA 200-meter freestyle relay champion (1997, 1999, 2000), two-time NCAA Championship team member (1997 & 1999), who was selected as an NCAA Top VIII Award winner as one of the eight top NCAA student-athletes and the 2000 male Walter Byers Scholarship winner as the National Collegiate Athletic Association's top scholar-athlete. He was a two-time CoSIDA Academic All-America honoree (1999, 2nd team & 2000, first team), and a three-time College Swimming Coaches Association of America (CSCAA) Scholar All-American (1998 3.80, 1999 3.82, 2000 4.00).

Busbee led the Auburn Tigers to the 1999 NCAA National team title and anchored the record setting 200 meter freestyle relay team. After graduating, summa cum laude with a 3.86 GPA, he went on to study at University of Alabama School of Medicine. Matthew was also a member of the 1997 NCAA champions, and the 1998 and 2000 teams were national runners up. The 2000 200 meter freestyle relay team set the world record with a time of 1:24.83. Busbee was a 12-time All-American (4 individual, 8 relay) plus an individual honorable mention All-American : 2000 (50 freestyle, 200 freestyle relay, 400 freestyle relay, 800 medley relay), 1999 (50 freestyle - HM, 200 freestyle relay, 200 medley relay), 1998 (50 freestyle, 100 freestyle, 200 freestyle relay, 200 medley relay), 1997 (50 freestyle, 200 freestyle relay).

He was a six-time Southeastern Conference swimming champion (two-time 50m freestyle, three-time 200m freestyle relay, one-time 400m freestyle relay). Although he was an Olympic hopeful, he was not entered in the Men's 50 meter freestyle race finals at the 2000 United States Olympic trials held in University of Indianapolis Natatorium in August 2000. Gary Hall, Jr. and Anthony Ervin were the Olympic qualifiers in the event and they tied for gold in a dead heat at the 2000 Summer Olympics 50 meter freestyle in 21.98 seconds, which was just .05 seconds ahead of Pieter van den Hoogenband.

He was a member of the 2000 Top VIII class with Drew Brees, Alia Fischer, Andrea Garner, Kristy Kowal, Kevin Listerman, Amanda Scott, and Josh Sims.
