= Patricia Brülhart =

Swiss swimmer

Personal information
- Born: 29 January 1968 (age 58)

Sport
- Sport: Swimming

Patricia Brülhart (born 29 January 1968) is a Swiss breaststroke swimmer. She competed at the 1984 Summer Olympics and the 1988 Summer Olympics.
