= Ute Hasse =

German swimmer (born 1963)

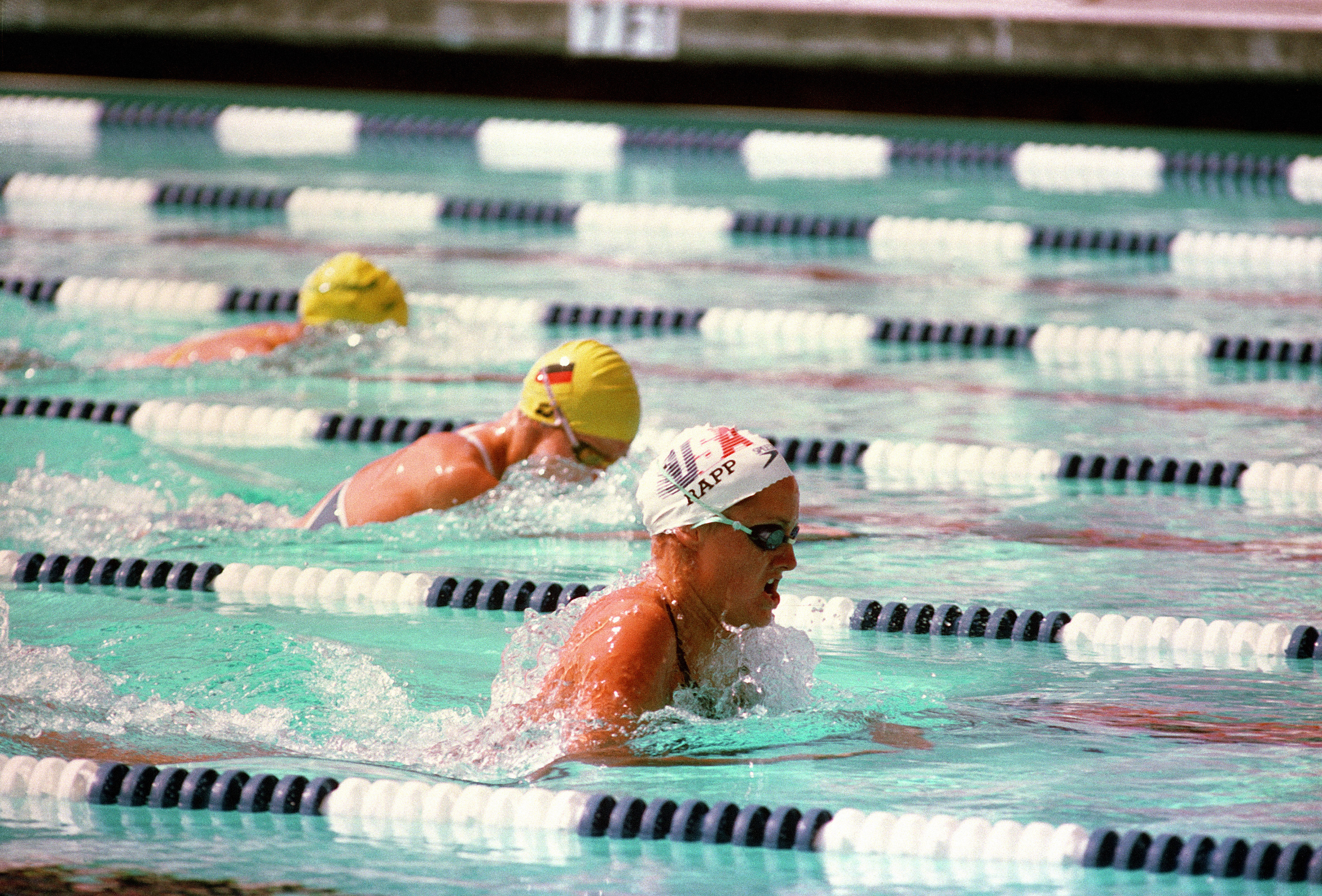

Personal information
- Born: September 16, 1963 (age 62) Düren, West Germany

Sport
- Sport: Swimming
- Strokes: Breaststroke
Medal record
Representing West Germany
Olympic Games
Silver medal – second place	1984 Los Angeles	4x100 m medley relay
European Aquatics Championships
Bronze medal – third place	1983 Rome	4x100m medley relay

Ute Hasse (born 16 September 1963) is a German former swimmer who competed in the 1984 Summer Olympics.
