= Oswaldo Quevedo =

Venezuelan swimmer (born 1976)

Oswaldo (Ozzie) Quevedo
Personal information
- Full name: Oswaldo Jose Quevedo Boschetti
- Nickname: Ozzie
- Nationality: Venezuela
- Born: August 4, 1976 (age 50) Maracay, Aragua, Venezuela
- Height: 1.96 m (6 ft 5 in)
- Weight: 90 kg (198 lb)

Sport
- Sport: Swimming
- Strokes: Butterfly and Freestyle
- College team: Auburn University (USA) (1998-'00)
Medal record
Pan American Games
Bronze medal – third place	1999 Winnipeg	400m Freestyle Relay
Silver medal – second place	2003 Santo Domingo	400m Freestyle Relay
South American Open Championships
Gold medal – first place	2000 South American Open Championships	100m Butterfly
Gold medal – first place	2000 South American Open Championships	50m Butterfly

Oswaldo Jose Quevedo Boschetti (born August 4, 1976, in Maracay) is a former butterfly and freestyle swimmer from Venezuela, who won the 50m and 100m Butterfly at the 2000 South American Championships (50m) in Mar del Plata. Two years later, at the later edition of the same Championship 2002 South American Championships, the sprinter from South America triumphed in the 100m Butterfly. He represented his homeland at the 2000 Olympic Games in Sydney, Australia.

== Careeer ==
He swam collegiately for the USA's Auburn University in the late 1990s.

Quevedo was part of the 200m Freestyle Relay that broke the US Open and NCAA Record at the 2000 NCAA Division I Championships in Minneapolis, Minnesota, USA.

At the 1998 Central American and Caribbean Games, he set a Games Record the 100 fly Championship Record in the preliminary heats. This record stood until the final session where it was bettered by fellow Venezuelan Swimmer Francisco Sánchez.

He currently holds the World Records in the 50m and 100m butterfly for Masters in his age group.

Lastly, Ozzie is considered by many high-profile coaches in the world as one of the best male swimmers that ever came out of Venezuela, along with Rafael Vidal Castro, Alberto Mestre, Francisco Sanchez and Albert Subirats.
