= David Marsh (swimming coach) =

American swimming coach

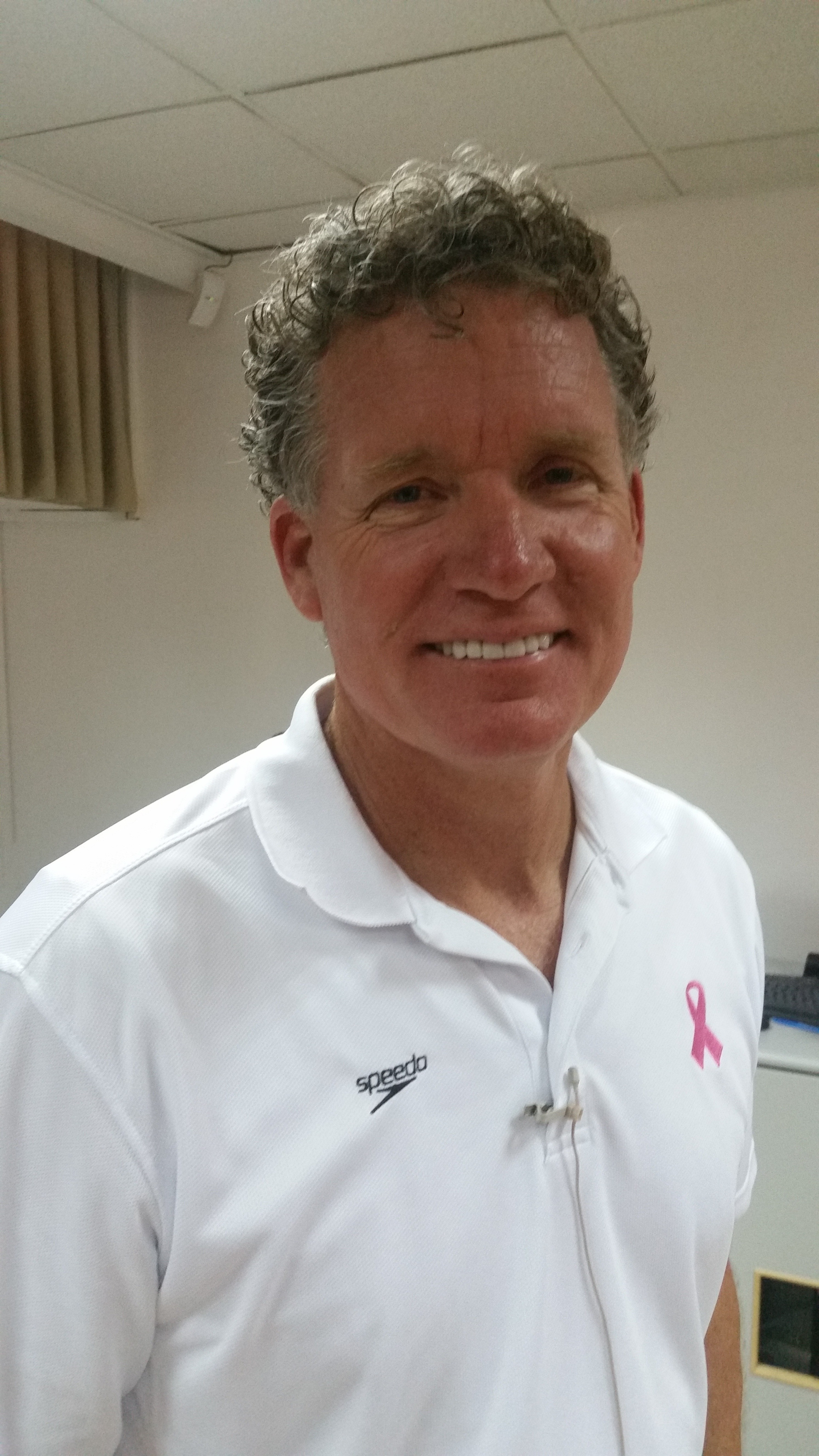
David Marsh

David Marsh (born December 29, 1958) is the associate head coach at University of California, Berkeley and head coach of Team Elite in San Diego, California, and the ‘Professional Adviser’ of the Israel Swimming Association.

Marsh worked to build Team Elite under SwimMAC Carolina since 2007. Prior to founding Team Elite he was the men's and women's swimming coach at Auburn University. After becoming head coach of Auburn in 1990, Marsh led the men's team to seven NCAA national championships (1997, 1999, 2003, 2004, 2005, 2006, and 2007) and the women's team to five national championships (2002, 2003, 2004, 2006, 2007). He finished his coaching career at Auburn at the conclusion of the 2007 season, after which he became the Head Elite Coach and CEO of the United States Olympic Committee Center of Excellence with SwimMAC Carolina. To date, Marsh has led SwimMAC to three consecutive USA club excellence championships, a first for any program, outdistancing the second-place finisher by 12,000 points (see www.usaswimming.org). He was the head swim coach for University of California San Diego, an NCAA Division II program for two seasons from 2017 to 2019.

The internationally known coach has coached 49 Olympians from 19 countries. In December 2016 Marsh was named the ‘Professional Adviser’ of the Israel Swimming Association, with a goal of preparing the country's swimmers for the Tokyo 2020 Olympics.

== Early life ==
Marsh is originally from Miami, Florida and received his degree in Business Administration from Auburn in 1981. Marsh was a five-time All-American backstroker at Auburn.

== Success at Auburn ==
Marsh has won 17 SEC titles (13 men and 4 women), by far the most of any Auburn coach or team.

In 2003 he led both the men's and women's teams to a sweep of the NCAA titles, a first in collegiate Swimming and Diving. Marsh and the Tigers went on to repeat this accomplishment three more times (2004, 2006, and 2007).

Marsh inherited a strong swimming program that was a fixture in the national swimming scene and regularly in the top 20 but was in a slump and turned it into a dynastic powerhouse. Since Marsh took over the Auburn swimming and diving program, Auburn's men finished in the Top 10 every year but his first two years (1991 & 1992 Auburn teams finished 20th and 15th). In 1990, the year before Marsh came to Auburn, the team failed to qualify any swimmers for the NCAA Division I Championship Meet; in Marsh's first year in 1991, the men's team placed 20th at the championship meet. In 1993 the Tigers finished #6 in the NCAAs and have not fallen out of the top 10 since, with the lowest placing in that time being #7 in 2001. The women have been equally successful, jumping from #30 in Marsh's first year to #8 in his second of 92. The lowest finish for the Tiger women since 1992 was #13 in 1995.

== SwimMAC Carolina (formerly known as Mecklenburg Aquatic Club ) ==
Marsh, Head Coach at Auburn University, became CEO & Director of Coaching for SwimMAC Carolina Mecklenburg Aquatic Club in the summer of 2007. Marsh focused his attention on developing an Elite component of the program, for athletes who rise to a world-class level from within the SwimMAC program, as well as those relocating to North Carolina, such as post-graduate and professional swimmers focusing on their Olympic dreams.

In 2016 Marsh and Team Elite placed Anthony Ervin, Ryan Lochte, Cammille Adams, Kathleen Baker, Jimmy Feigen, and Katie Meili on the US Olympic Team.

In late 2016, the board decided to move forward without Marsh as CEO and agreed to work to redefine his and Team Elite's role at the club. In May 2017, SwimMAC and Marsh announced a mutual parting of ways.

== Olympians ==
Marsh has coached 49 Olympians from 19 countries.

== Individual champions ==
Marsh's swimmers have combined to win 89 individual NCAA titles and 277 individual SEC titles. Auburn swimmers have also brought home 90 medals from international competitions such as the World Championships, Goodwill Games, Pan-American Games, and the Olympics.

== 2016 Olympics ==
On September 9, 2015, USA Swimming announced that Marsh would serve as the head coach of the women's roster of the 2016 US Olympic Swimming Team. Marsh stated: "I will do all I can to uphold the unmatched tradition of excellence that has been established by the swimmers and coaches from the previous Olympic Games." A total of 8 medals were achieved by the Team Elite Athletes. 1 Gold for Ryan Lochte (4x200 free relay), 2 Gold for Anthony Ervin (4x100 free relay prelims & 50 free); 2 for Katie Meili (Bronze 100 Br & Gold 4x100 medley relay prelims); 1 Gold for Jimmy Feigen (4x100 free relay prelims); 2 for Kathleen Baker (Silver 100 back; Gold 4x100 medley relay)

== Israel ==
In December 2016 Marsh was named the ‘Professional Adviser’ of the Israel Swimming Association, with a goal of preparing the country's swimmers for the Tokyo 2020 Olympics.

== Coaching honors ==
CSCAA Women's Coach of the Year: `01, `02, `03

CSCAA Men's Coach of the Year: `94, `97, `99, `03, `04

SEC Men's Coach of the Year: `92, `93, `97, `98, `99, `01, `03, `04, `05

SEC Women's Coach of the Year: `93, `02, `03

Knoxville News-Sentinel Men's Coach of the Year: `93, `95, `98, `99, `01, `03, `04

Knoxville News-Sentinel Women's Coach of the Year: `92, `93, `03

Inside the Auburn Tigers Coach of the Year: `93, `96, `97, `03, `04

2016 USA Women's Olympic Team Head Coach

2014 USA Women's Team Assistant Pan Pac Championships, Australia

2012 USA Men's Olympic Team Assistant

2010 USA Men's Duel in the Pool Head Coach

2005 USA World Championships Assistant Men's Assistant Coach

2003 USA World Championships Head Coach

2003 & 2005 USA Men's Mutual of Omaha Duel in the Pool Head Coach

2000 & 2003 National Collegiate and Scholastic Swimming Trophy

2003 Board Member of the Greater Lee County Boys and Girls Club

2000 USA Men's Olympic Team Assistant Coach

1999 USA Men's Pan-Pacific Team Assistant Coach

1996 USA Men's Olympic Team Assistant Coach

1995 USA Men's Pan-Pacific Team Head Coach

1994 USA Women's Assistant Coach-World Championship Team

Honored on the "Tiger Trail" of Auburn which commemorates athletic achievements by coaches and athletes.

2016 Inducted into the North Carolina Swimming Hall of Fame

2015 Inducted into the Auburn Swimming Hall of Fame

Marsh also serves on the boards of the American Swimming Coaches Association as well as the Championship Performance Advisory Board.
