= Georgia Bulldogs swimming and diving =

NCAA swimming and diving team representing the University of Georgia

- Founded: 1926 (Men); 1974 (Women)
- Head coach: Jack Bauerle
- Conference: Southeastern Conference
- Location: Athens, Georgia, US
- Home pool: Gabrielsen Natatorium
- Nickname: Swim Dawgs
- Colors: Red and black

Women's NCAA Champions
- 7 (1999, 2000, 2001, 2005, 2013, 2014, 2016)

Men's Conference Champions
- 3 (1951, 1952, 1955)

Women's Conference Champions
- 12 (1997, 1998, 1999, 2000, 2001, 2006, 2010, 2011, 2012, 2013, 2014, 2015)

The Georgia Bulldogs swimming and diving team represents the University of Georgia (UGA) in NCAA men's and women's swimming and diving. Also known as the "Swim Dawgs," the teams compete at Gabrielsen Natatorium in Athens, Georgia, USA. The women have won seven NCAA national championships (1999, 2000, 2001, 2005, 2013, 2014, 2016). Following Jack Bauerle's retirement in 2022, the programs established separate men's and women's coaching staffs, with Neil Versfeld serving as head coach of the men's team, and Stefanie Williams Moreno serving as head coach of the women's team. Chris Colwill serves as head diving coach for both programs.

== History ==
The men's team was formed in 1926 by Clarence Jones and practices were held in the Athens YMCA 20-yard pool. The men's team later moved to Stegeman Hall, an indoor athletics and training facility built during World War I and demolished in 1996. The women's team began competing in 1974. Both teams moved to their current facility, Gabrielsen Natatorium, in 1996.

The women's 1st-place finish in the 2016 Women's NCAA national championships was their 21st consecutive top-7 effort at that meet. The men's team has finished in the top 15 at Men's NCAA national championships every year since 1997. A 5th place showing at the 2016 Men's championship was the fourteenth top-ten finish for the men's team in its history.

=== Men’s team head coaches ===
Coach	Seasons	Years	Wins	Losses	Ties	Win %
Neil Versfeld	4	2022-present				
Jack Bauerle (^{†}As of 2012-2013 season)	38	1983–2021	201^{†}	87^{†}	1^{†}	.697^{†}
Pete Scholle	13	1971-1983	97	53	0	.647
Alan Gentry	3	1968-1970	16	18	0	.471
Richard Wammock	1	1966-1967	9	4	0	.692
Bramwell W. “Bump” Gabrielson	19	1948-1966	118	106	4	.526
Ed Sterrett and Bill Dix	1	1946-1947	1	6	0	.143
Clarence W. “Jonesy” Jones	16	1926-1942	41	36	0	.532

=== Women’s team head coaches ===
Coach	Seasons	Years	Wins	Losses	Ties	Win %
Stefanie Williams Moreno	4	2022-present				
Jack Bauerle (^{†}As of 2012-2013 season)	34	1979–present^{†}	287	33	1	.896
Dr. Joe McEvoy	2	1977-1979	11	10	0	.524
Martha Washington	4	1974-1977	NA	NA	NA	NA

== Facilities ==
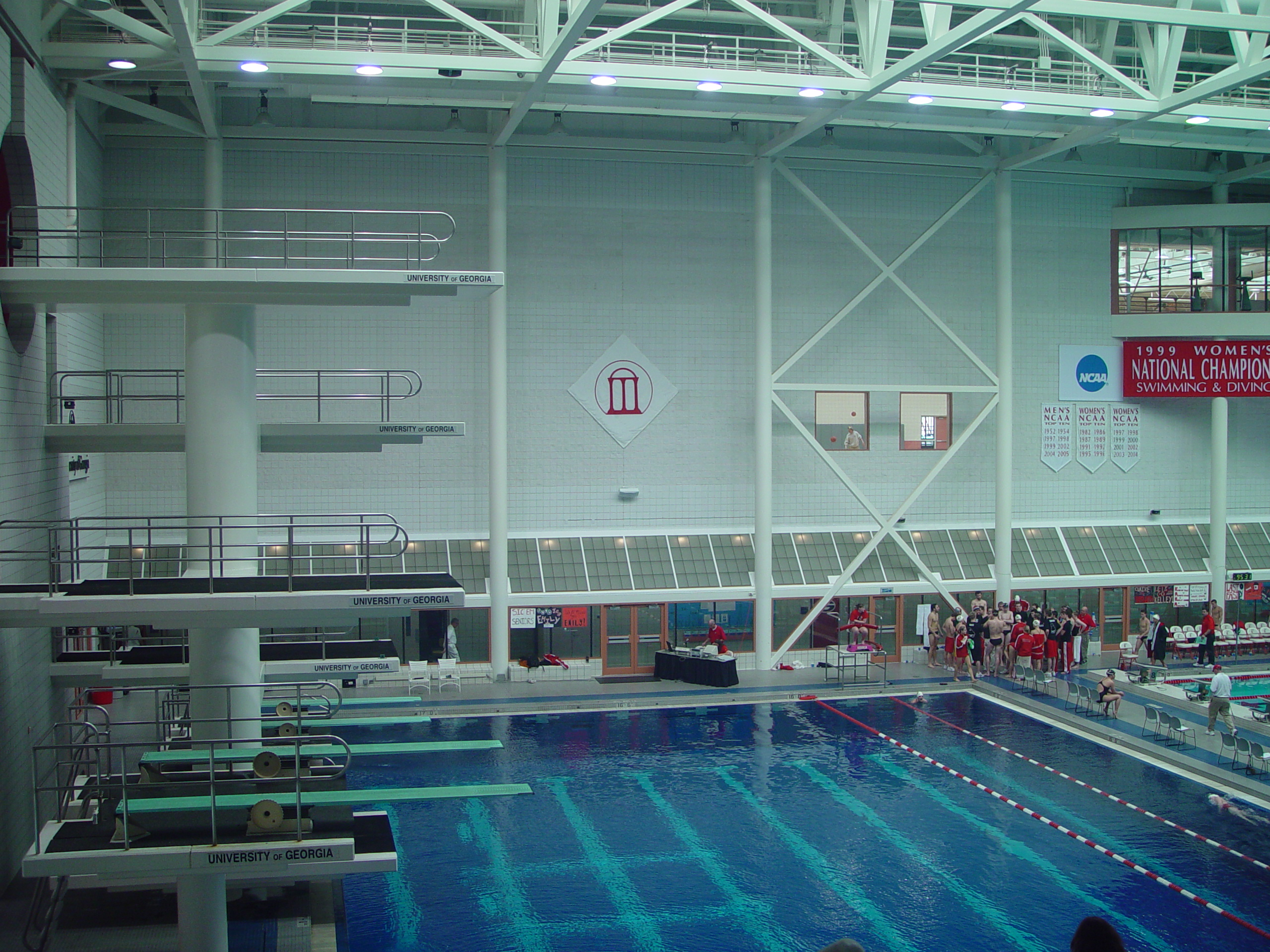
Gabrielsen Natatorium at the University of Georgia

The Georgia Swimming and Diving program competes in Gabrielsen Natatorium located on the UGA campus. The center opened in 1996 and has hosted competitions including the SEC Championships and NCAA Championships.

== NCAA national team championships ==
The women's team has won seven NCAA national championships.

Georgia Bulldogs team NCAA national championships
Year	Team	National champion	Score	Runner-up	Score	Location
1999	Women	Georgia	504.5	Stanford	441	Athens, Georgia
2000	Women	Georgia	490.5	Arizona	472	Indianapolis, Indiana
2001	Women	Georgia	389	Stanford	387.5	Long Island, New York
2005	Women	Georgia	609.5	Auburn	492	West Lafayette, Indiana
2013	Women	Georgia	477	Cal	393	Indianapolis, Indiana
2014	Women	Georgia	528	Stanford	402.5	Minneapolis, Minnesota
2016	Women	Georgia	414	Stanford	395	Atlanta, Georgia

== NCAA national championship meet history ==
Georgia Bulldogs NCAA national championship meet team history
Year	Team	Place	Points	Team	Place	Points
2025	Women	16th	58	Men	7th	238.5
2024	Women	13th	116	Men	11th	116
2023	Women	16th	90.5	Men	12th	96
2022	Women	15th	104.5	Men	8th	194
2021	Women	8th	181	Men	4th	268
2019	Women	18th	66	Men	18th	86
2018	Women	11th	135	Men	10th	129
2017	Women	4th	252.5	Men	8th	183
2016	Women	1st	414	Men	5th	239.5
2015	Women	2nd	452	Men	7th	208.5
2014	Women	1st	528	Men	5th	259
2013	Women	1st	477	Men	10th	163
2012	Women	2nd	366	Men	11th	106.5
2011	Women	2nd	394.5	Men	10th	157
2010	Women	5th	342.5	Men	8th	143
2009	Women	2nd	400.5	Men	10th	131
2008	Women	7th	198	Men	7th	229
2007	Women	5th	290	Men	13th	98
2006	Women	2nd	515.5	Men	9th	197
2005	Women	1st	609.5	Men	10th	177
2004	Women	2nd	431	Men	10th	112.5
2003	Women	2nd	373	Men	14th	104
2002	Women	2nd	386	Men	10th	167
2001	Women	1st	389	Men	15th	78
2000	Women	1st	490.5	Men	15th	92
1999	Women	1st	504.5	Men	9th	149.5
1998	Women	3rd	368	Men	7th	175.5
1997	Women	5th	500	Men	3rd	847
1996	Women	5th	268	Men	11th	127
1995	Women	6th	247	Men	16th	
1994	Women	15th	85	Men	16th	
1993	Women	12th	94	Men	15th	92
1992	Women	9th	130	Men	32nd	13
1991	Women	8th	137	Men		
1990	Women	13th	85	Men	30th	14
1989	Women	10th	126	Men	26th	
1988	Women	14th	84	Men	31st	
1987	Women	6th	182	Men		
1986	Women	9th	116	Men		
1985	Women	13th	89	Men		
1984	Women	17th	26	Men		
1983	Women	22nd (Tie)	17	Men		

== Notable current and former team members ==
Current and former Georgia Bulldog Swimmers & Divers
Swimmers		Divers	
Men	Women	Men	Women
Damian Alleyne; Wan Azlan Abdullah; Yousef Al-Askari; Jack Bauerle; Joseph Bentz; Nic Fink; Mike Fung-A-Wing; Yoav Gath; Andrew Gemmell; Chase Kalisz; Håkan Karlsson; Nicolas Kintz; Matias Koski; Josh Laban; Jay Litherland; Dan Magill; Robert Margalis; David McLellan; Miguel Mendoza; Allan Murray; Chris Murray; Matthew O'Connor; Reid Patterson; Troyden Prinsloo; Sébastien Rouault; Kyle Salyards; Sonny Seiler; Gil Stovall; Luca Urlando; Neil Versfeld; Ediz Yıldırımer	Helena Åberg; Amanda Adkins; Samantha Arsenault; Kim Black; Lisa Coole; Maritza Correia; Mary DeScenza; Lauren English; Hali Flickinger; Missy Franklin; Erika Hansen; Julie Hardt; Elizabeth Hill; Kara Lynn Joyce; Kristy Kowal; Mary Lubawski; Brittany MacLean; Melanie Margalis; Jordan Mattern; Michelle McKeehan; Sarah Poewe; Aleksandra Putra; Megan Romano; Allison Schmitt; Morgan Scroggy; Courtney Shealy; Keren Siebner Israeli; Olivia Smoliga; Sheila Taormina; Wendy Trott; Chantal van Landeghem; Shannon Vreeland; Amanda Weir; Ashley Whitney	Chris Colwill	Laura Ryan
